= Coffin portrait =

Portrait of the deceased used to decorate a coffin during a funeral service

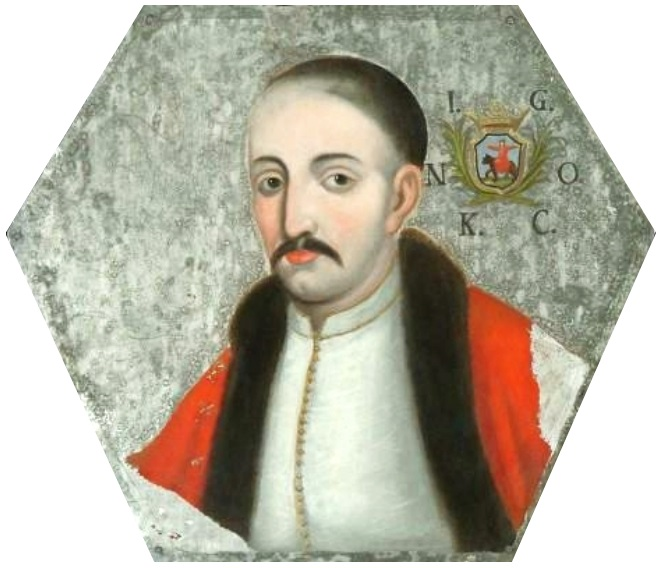
Coffin portrait of Jan Gniewosz, c. 1700, oil on tin plate. Signature: I.[an] G.[niewosz] N.[a] O.[oleksowie] K.[asztelan] C.[zchowski] English: Jan Gniewosz [lord] of Oleksów, castellan of Czchów

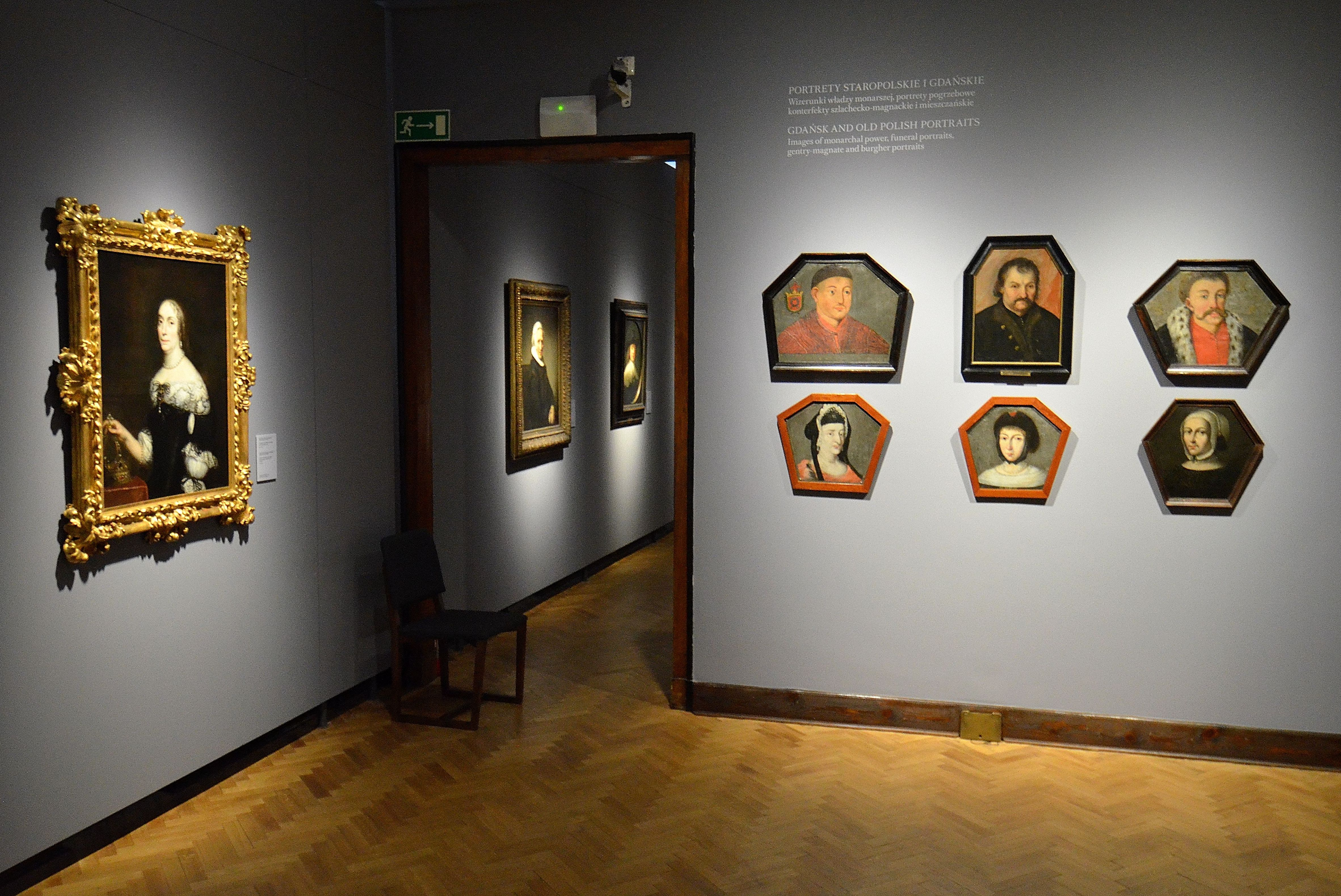
Coffin portraits in the National Museum in Warsaw

A coffin portrait (Polish: Portret trumienny) was a realistic portrait of the deceased person put on coffins for the funeral and one of the elements of the castrum doloris, but removed before the burial. It became a tradition to decorate coffins of deceased nobles (szlachta) with such funerary art in the times of the Polish–Lithuanian Commonwealth, particularly in the 17th and 18th centuries, the time of the baroque in Poland and Sarmatism. The tradition was limited to Commonwealth countries, although the term may also describe the Ancient Egyptian mummy portraits.

== Design ==
They were commonly painted on sheet metal (copper, tin or lead plates) and fixed on the narrow ends of the coffins at the side where the head of the deceased lay. On the opposite of the coffin there was usually an epitaph, and the sides held a coat of arms. The shape of the upper edges of the portraits was based on the shape of the coffin, and the lower edges were often used to turn the whole into a hexagon or octagon. After the funeral, the coffin portrait would often be hung on the walls of the church that the deceased had contributed to. In time, they increased in size – from 40 x 45 cm in the 17th century, to 70 x 72 cm in the 18th century.

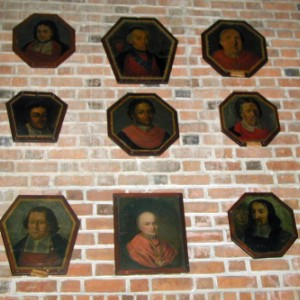
Coffin portraits on display at Poznań Cathedral, painters unknown.

The portraits were highly realistic, with the intent to create an impression that the deceased is taking part in their own funeral; that impression was reinforced often by the subject of the portrait gazing directly at the viewers. Some of them were painted during the life of the deceased.

== Cultural importance ==
Historian Bernard O'Connor in his memoirs of 1696 wrote: "There is so much pomp and ceremony in Polish funerals that you would sooner take them to be a triumphant event than the burial of the dead". Indeed, for Polish nobles (szlachta), a proper funeral was extremely important. Those who could afford it spent lavishly on the funeral ceremonies, turning them into major events. But even the poor would try to have at least a basic coffin portrait, albeit those, painted by amateur painters, usually have little or no artistic merit.

Until the 20th century, the coffin portraits were ignored by scholars; those painted on silver or tin were stolen from churches and monasteries and then melted down, others were destroyed by treasure hunters and thieves, or simply fell to the ravages of time. Today the surviving coffin portraits provide a wealth of knowledge about culture (clothing, hairstyles and jewellery) of the Commonwealth nobility. Many coffin portraits are still displayed in various churches across Poland; hundreds are held in various museums.

The oldest coffin portrait in Poland is that of the king Stefan Batory from the late 16th century. The most recent one is that of priest Marcin Porczyński from 1809.

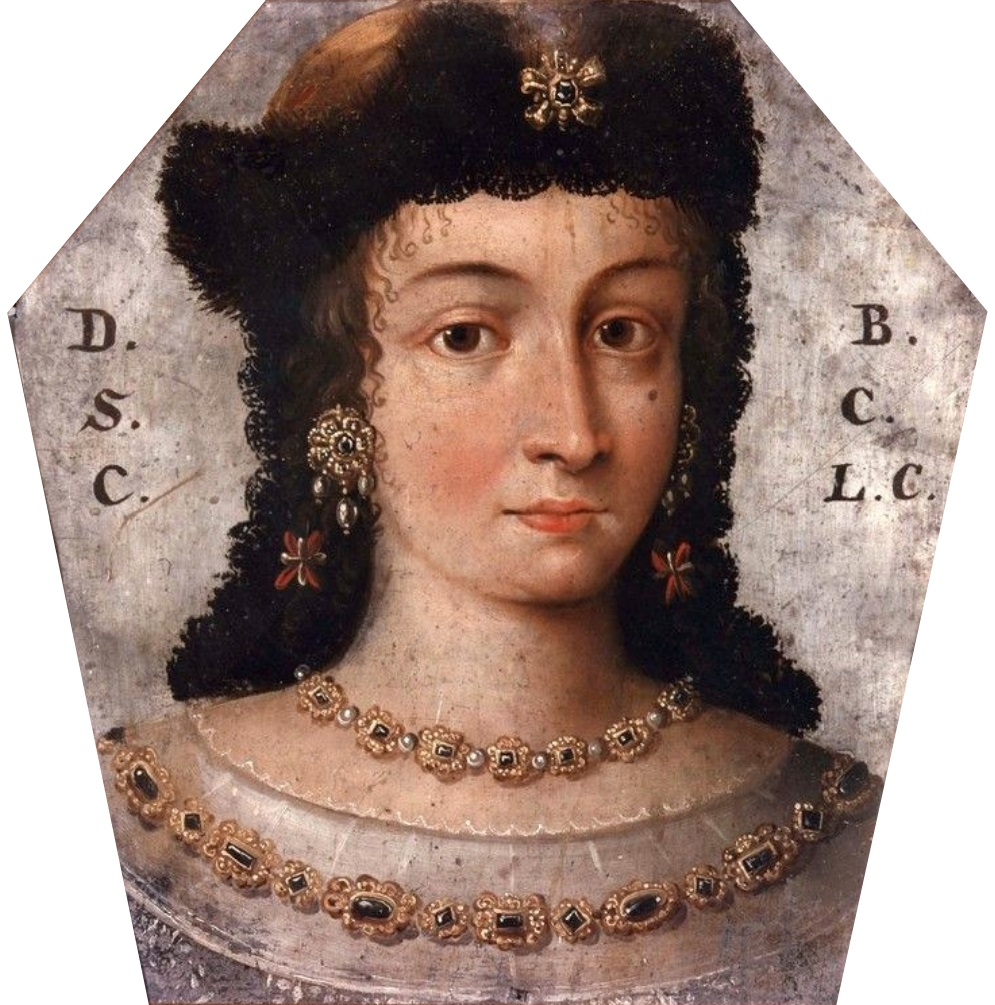
Coffin portrait of Barbara Lubomirska, 1676.

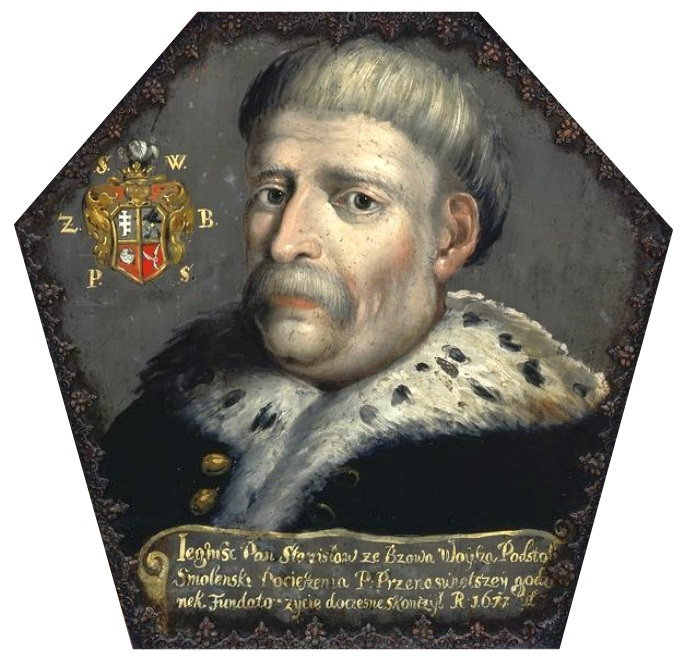
Coffin portrait of Stanisław Woysz, 1677.

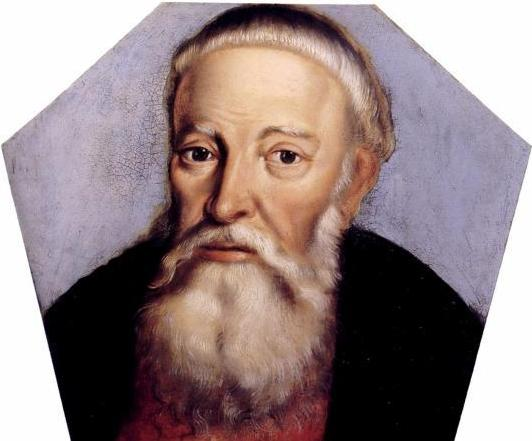
Coffin portrait of Baltazar Horlemes, 1682.

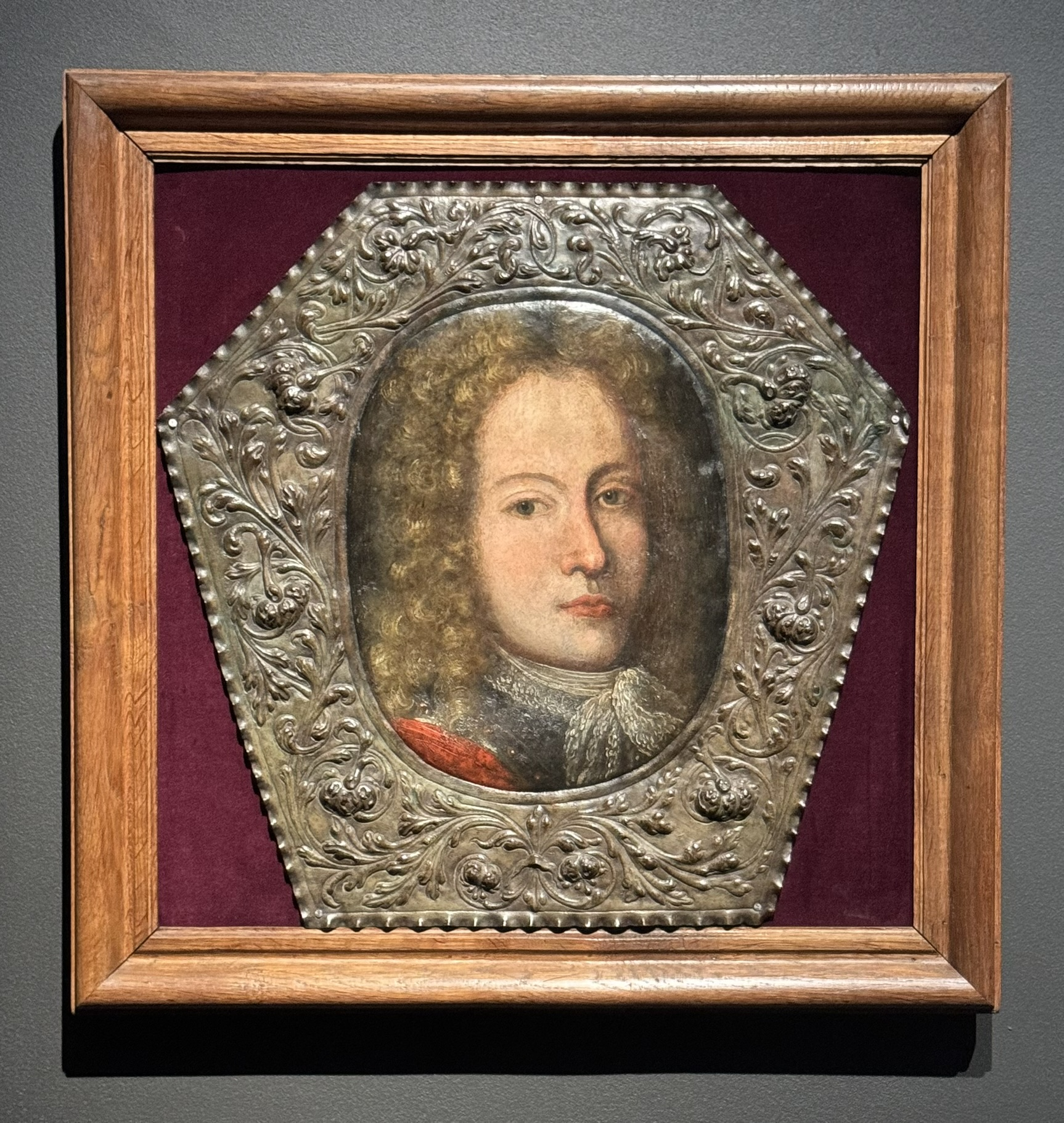
Coffin portrait of a nobleman by an unknown Polish painter, ca. 1700.

== See also ==
- Fayum mummy portraits
- Funeral Crown
- Oświęcim Chapel

== Sources ==
- Jan K. Ostrowski, Land of the Winged Horsemen: Art in Poland, 1572-1764, Yale University Press, 1999, ISBN 0-300-07918-4, p. 279 Google Print
- The Theater of Transition: COFFIN PORTRAITS, Warsaw Voice, 23 February 1997
