= Funerary art =

Art associated with a repository for the remains of the dead

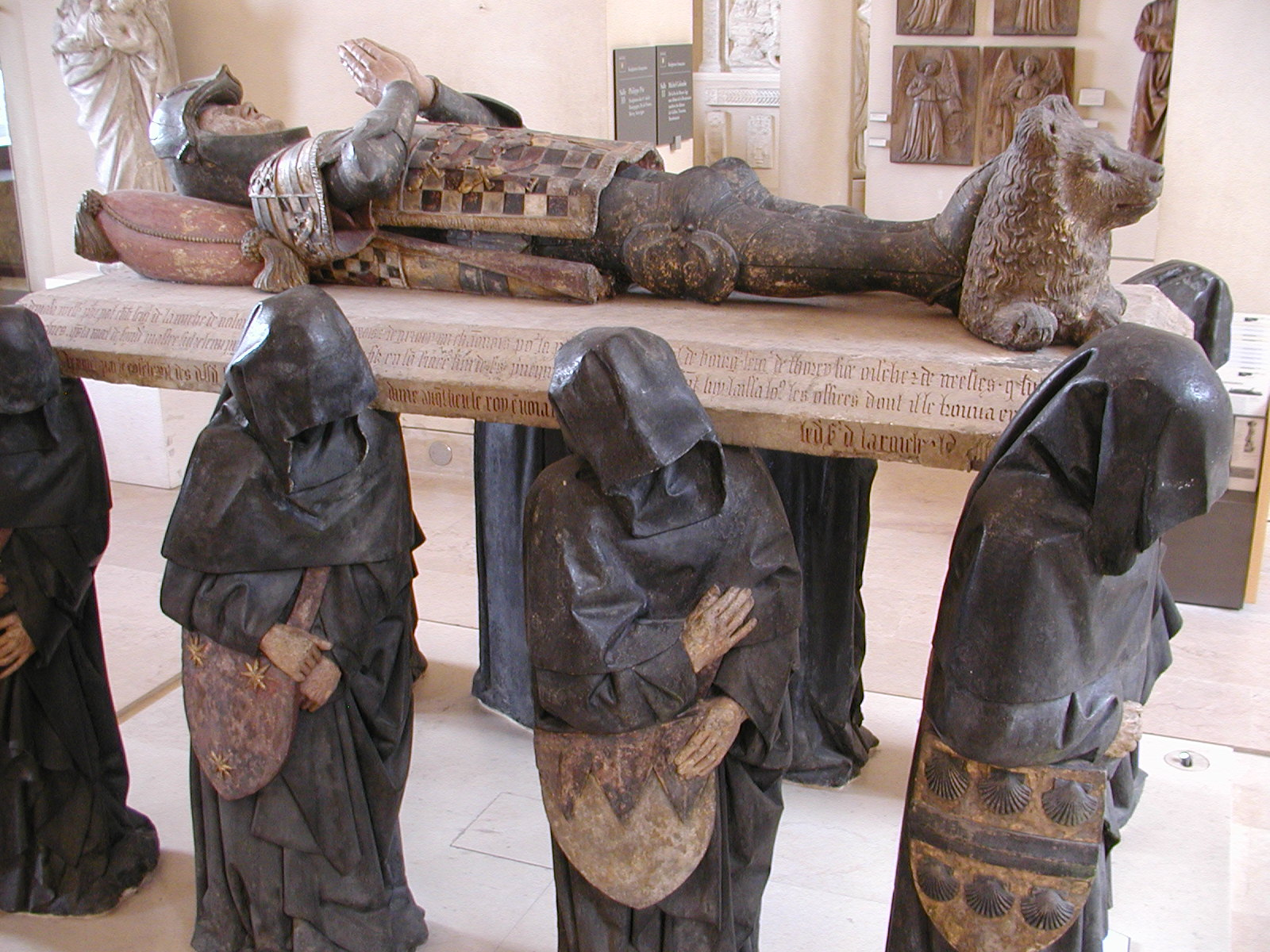
Tomb of Philippe Pot with life-sized hooded pleurants, c. 1477–80, now in the Louvre, Paris

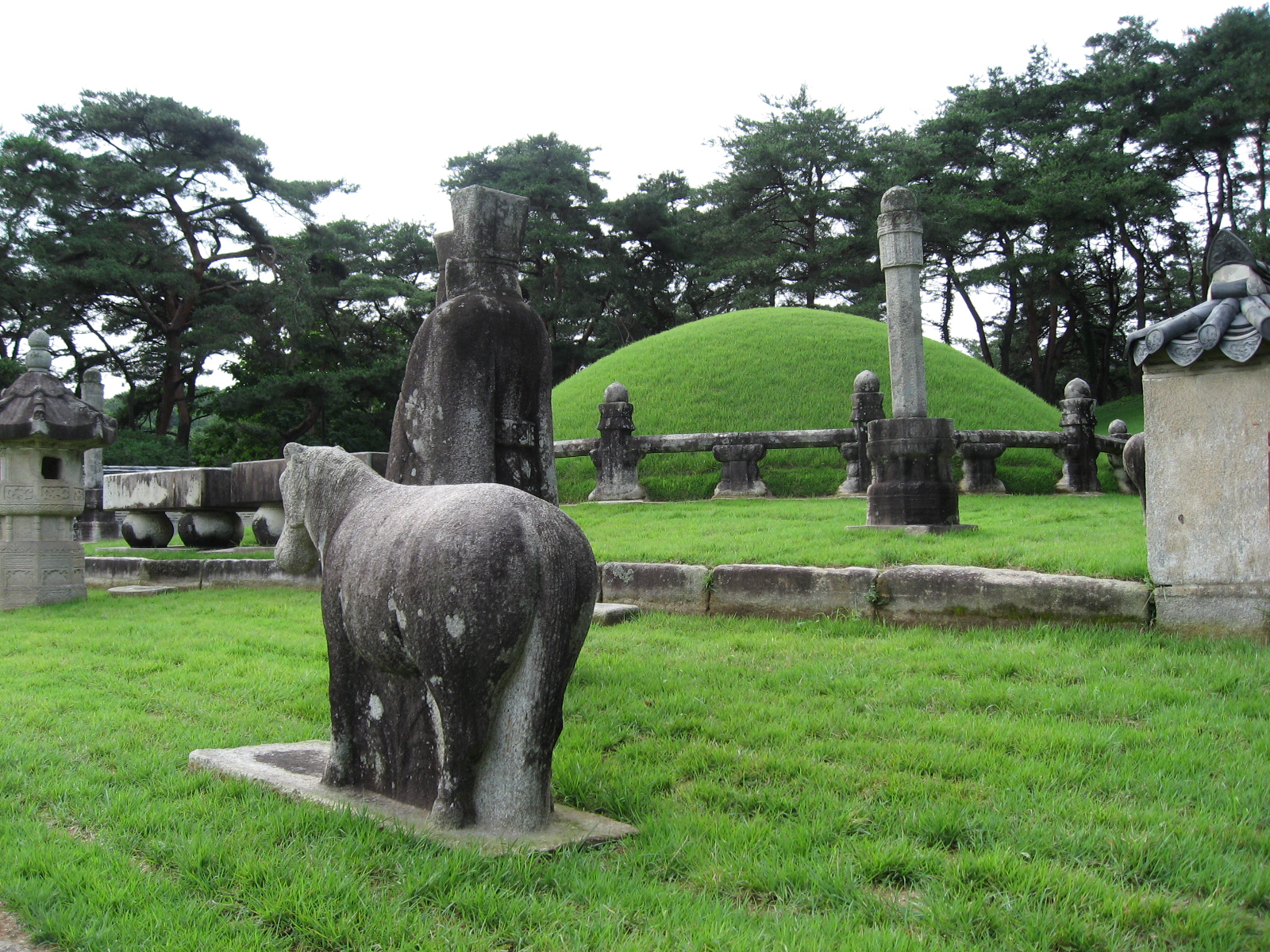
Korean tomb mound of King Sejong the Great, d. 1450

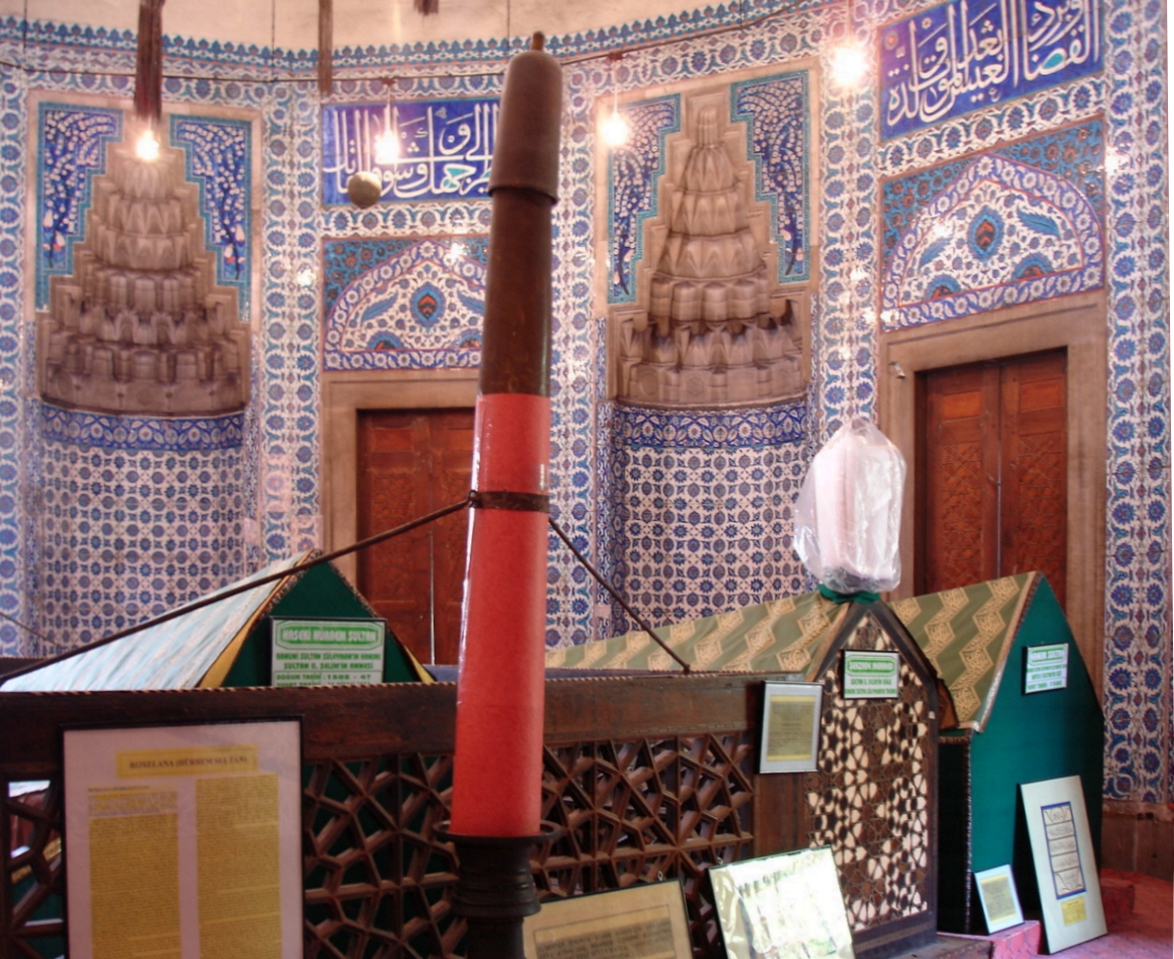
Türbe of Roxelana (d. 1558), Süleymaniye Mosque, Istanbul

Funerary art is any work of art forming, or placed in, a repository for the remains of the dead. The term encompasses a wide variety of forms, including cenotaphs ("empty tombs"), tomb-like monuments which do not contain human remains, and communal memorials to the dead, such as war memorials, which may or may not contain remains, and a range of prehistoric megalithic constructs. Funerary art may serve many cultural functions. It can play a role in burial rites, serve as an article for use by the dead in the afterlife, and celebrate the life and accomplishments of the dead, whether as part of kinship-centred practices of ancestor veneration or as a publicly directed dynastic display. It can also function as a reminder of the mortality of humankind, as an expression of cultural values and roles, and help to propitiate the spirits of the dead, maintaining their benevolence and preventing their unwelcome intrusion into the lives of the living.

The deposit of objects with an apparent aesthetic intention is found in almost all cultures – Hindu culture, which has little, is a notable exception. Many of the best-known artistic creations of past cultures – from the Egyptian pyramids and the Tutankhamun treasure, to the Terracotta Army surrounding the tomb of Qin Shi Huang, the Mausoleum of Halicarnassus, the Sutton Hoo ship burial and the Taj Mahal – are tombs or objects found in and around them. In most instances, specialized funeral art was produced for the powerful and wealthy, although the burials of ordinary people might include simple monuments and grave goods, usually from their possessions.

An important factor in the development of traditions of funerary art is the division between what was intended to be visible to visitors or the public after completion of the funeral ceremonies. The treasure of the 18th dynasty Pharaoh Tutankhamun, for example, though exceptionally lavish, was never intended to be seen again after it was deposited, while the exterior of the pyramids was a permanent and highly effective demonstration of the power of their creators. A similar division can be seen in grand East Asian tombs. In other cultures, nearly all the art connected with the burial, except for limited grave goods, was intended for later viewing by the public or at least those admitted by the custodians. In these cultures, traditions such as the sculpted sarcophagus and tomb monument of the Greek and Roman empires, and later the Christian world, have flourished. The mausoleum intended for visiting was the grandest type of tomb in the classical world, and later common in Islamic culture.

== Terminology ==
Tomb is a general term for any repository for human remains, while grave goods are other objects which have been placed within the tomb. Such objects may include the personal possessions of the deceased, objects specially created for the burial, or miniature versions of things believed to be needed in an afterlife. Knowledge of many non-literate cultures is drawn largely from these sources.

A tumulus, mound, kurgan, or long barrow covered important burials in many cultures, and the body may be placed in a sarcophagus, usually of stone, or a coffin, usually of wood. A mausoleum is a building erected mainly as a tomb, taking its name from the Mausoleum of Mausolus at Halicarnassus. Stele is a term for erect stones that are often what are now called gravestones. Ship burials are mostly found in coastal Europe, while chariot burials are found widely across Eurasia. Catacombs, of which the most famous examples are those in Rome and Alexandria, are underground cemeteries connected by tunnelled passages. A large group of burials with traces remaining above ground can be called a necropolis; if there are no such visible structures, it is a grave field. A cenotaph is a memorial without a burial.

The word "funerary" strictly means "of or pertaining to a funeral or burial", but there is a long tradition in English of applying it not only to the practices and artefacts directly associated with funeral rites, but also to a wider range of more permanent memorials to the dead. Particularly influential in this regard was John Weever's Ancient Funerall Monuments (1631), the first full-length book to be dedicated to the subject of tomb memorials and epitaphs. More recently, some scholars have challenged the usage: Phillip Lindley, for example, makes a point of referring to "tomb monuments", saying "I have avoided using the term 'funeral monuments' because funeral effigies were, in the Middle Ages, temporary products, made as substitutes for the encoffined corpse for use during the funeral ceremonies". Others, however, have found this distinction "rather pedantic".

Related genres of commemorative art for the dead take many forms, such as the moai figures of Easter Island, apparently a type of sculpted ancestor portrait, though hardly individualized. These are common in cultures as diverse as Ancient Rome and China, in both of which they are kept in the houses of the descendants, rather than being buried. Many cultures have psychopomp figures, such as the Greek Hermes and Etruscan Charun, who help conduct the spirits of the dead into the afterlife.

== History ==
=== Pre-history ===
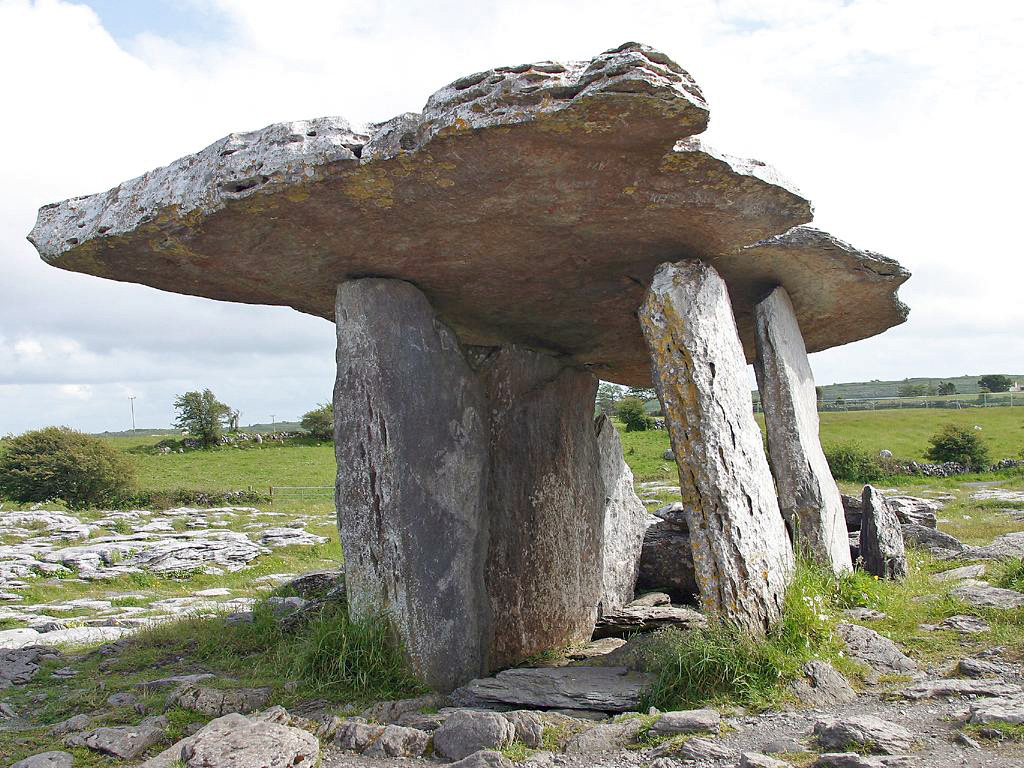
The Neolithic Poulnabrone dolmen in Ireland contains the bodies of at least 22 individuals

Most of humanity's oldest known archaeological constructions are tombs. Mostly megalithic, the earliest instances date to within a few centuries of each other, yet show a wide diversity of form and purpose. Tombs in the Iberian peninsula have been dated through thermoluminescence to c. 4510 BCE, and some burials at the Carnac stones in Brittany also date back to the fifth millennium BCE. The commemorative value of such burial sites are indicated by the fact that, at some stage, they became elevated, and that the constructs, almost from the earliest, sought to be monumental. This effect was often achieved by encapsulating a single corpse in a basic pit, surrounded by an elaborate ditch and drain. Over-ground commemoration is thought to be tied to the concept of collective memory, and these early tombs were likely intended as a form of ancestor-worship, a development available only to communities that had advanced to the stage of settled livestock and formed social roles and relationships and specialized sectors of activity.

In Neolithic and Bronze Age societies, a great variety of tombs are found, with tumulus mounds, megaliths, and pottery as recurrent elements. In Eurasia, a dolmen is the exposed stone framework for a chamber tomb originally covered by earth to make a mound which no longer exists. Stones may be carved with geometric patterns (petroglyphs), for example cup and ring marks. Group tombs were made, the social context of which is hard to decipher. Urn burials, where bones are buried in a pottery container, either in a more elaborate tomb, or by themselves, are widespread, by no means restricted to the Urnfield culture which is named after them, or even to Eurasia. Menhirs, or "standing stones", seem often to mark graves or serve as memorials, while the later runestones and image stones often are cenotaphs, or memorials apart from the grave itself; these continue into the Christian period. The Senegambian stone circles are a later African form of tomb markers.

=== Ancient Egypt and Nubia ===
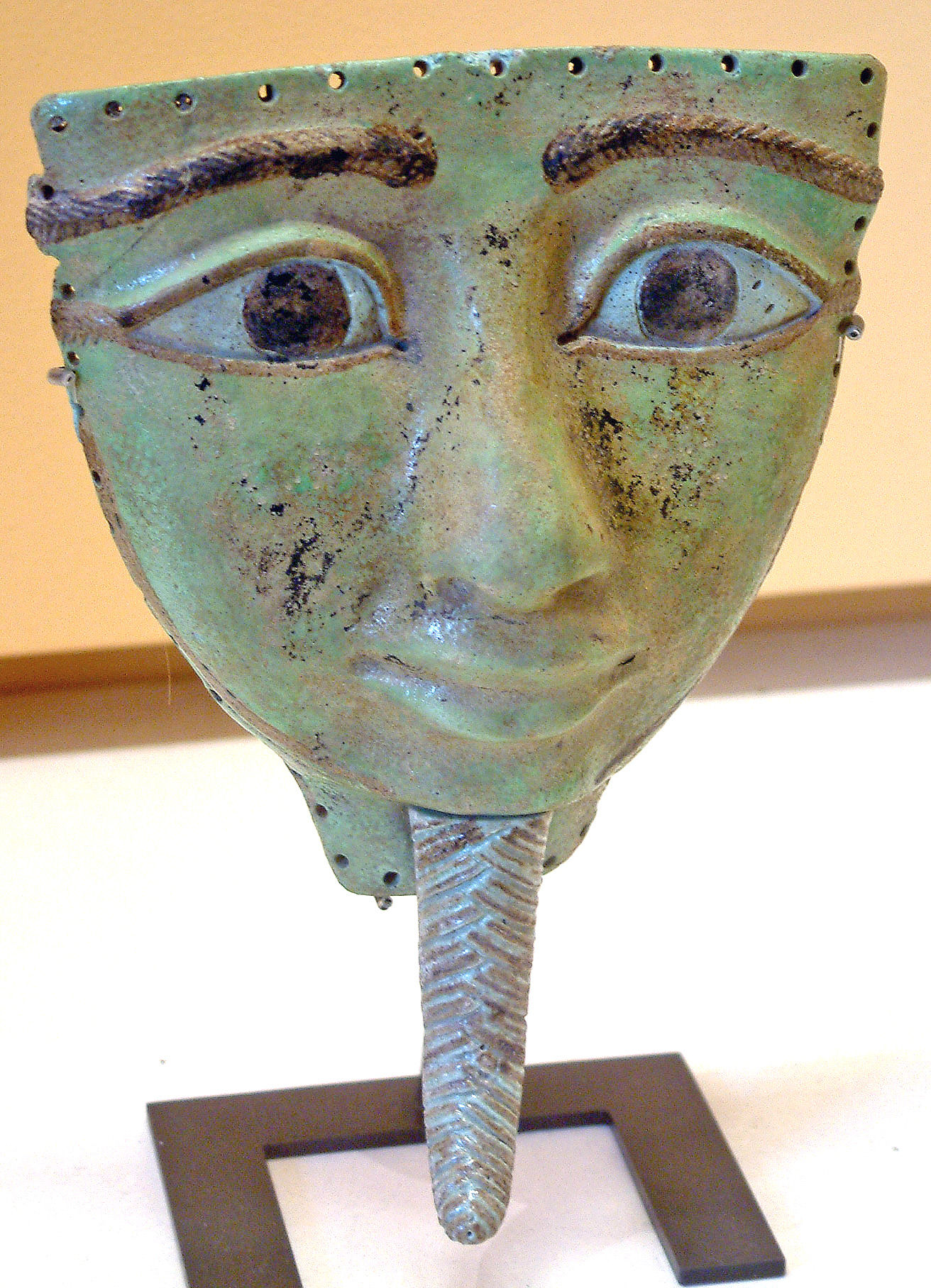
Egyptian ceramic coffin mask

Egyptian funerary art was inseparable to the religious belief that life continued after death and that "death is a mere phase of life". Aesthetic objects and images connected with this belief were partially intended to preserve material goods, wealth and status for the journey between this life and the next, and to "commemorate the life of the tomb owner ... depict performance of the burial rites, and in general present an environment that would be conducive to the tomb owner's rebirth." In this context are the Egyptian mummies encased in one or more layers of decorated coffin, and the canopic jars preserving internal organs. A special category of Ancient Egyptian funerary texts clarify the purposes of the burial customs. The early mastaba type of tomb had a sealed underground burial chamber but an offering-chamber on the ground level for visits by the living, a pattern repeated in later types of tomb. A Ka statue effigy of the deceased might be walled up in a serdab connected to the offering chamber by vents that allowed the smell of incense to reach the effigy. The walls of important tomb-chambers and offering chambers were heavily decorated with reliefs in stone or sometimes wood, or paintings, depicting religious scenes, portraits of the deceased, and at some periods vivid images of everyday life, depicting the afterlife. The chamber decoration usually centred on a "false door", through which only the soul of the deceased could pass, to receive the offerings left by the living.

Representational art, such as portraiture of the deceased, is found extremely early on and continues into the Roman period in the encaustic Faiyum funerary portraits applied to coffins. However, it is still hotly debated whether there was realistic portraiture in Ancient Egypt. The purpose of the life-sized reserve heads found in burial shafts or tombs of nobles of the Fourth dynasty is not well understood; they may have been a discreet method of eliding an edict by Khufu forbidding nobles from creating statues of themselves, or may have protected the deceased's spirit from harm or magically eliminated any evil in it, or perhaps functioned as alternate containers for the spirit if the body should be harmed in any way.

Architectural works such as the massive Great Pyramid and two smaller ones built during the Old Kingdom in the Giza Necropolis and (much later, from about 1500 BCE) the tombs in the Valley of the Kings were built for royalty and the elite. The Theban Necropolis was later an important site for mortuary temples and mastaba tombs. The Kushite kings who conquered Egypt and ruled as pharaohs during the Twenty-fifth Dynasty were greatly influenced by Egyptian funerary customs, employing mummification, canopic jars and ushabti funerary figurines. They also built the Nubian pyramids, which in both size and design more closely resemble the smaller Seventeenth dynasty pyramids at Thebes than those of the Old Kingdom near Memphis.

Lower-class citizens used common forms of funerary art—including shabti figurines (to perform any labor that might be required of the dead person in the afterlife), models of the scarab beetle and funerary texts—which they believed would protect them in the afterlife. During the Middle Kingdom, miniature wooden or clay models depicting scenes from everyday life became popular additions to tombs. In an attempt to duplicate the activities of the living in the afterlife, these models show laborers, houses, boats and even military formations which are scale representations of the ideal ancient Egyptian afterlife.

=== Ancient Greece ===
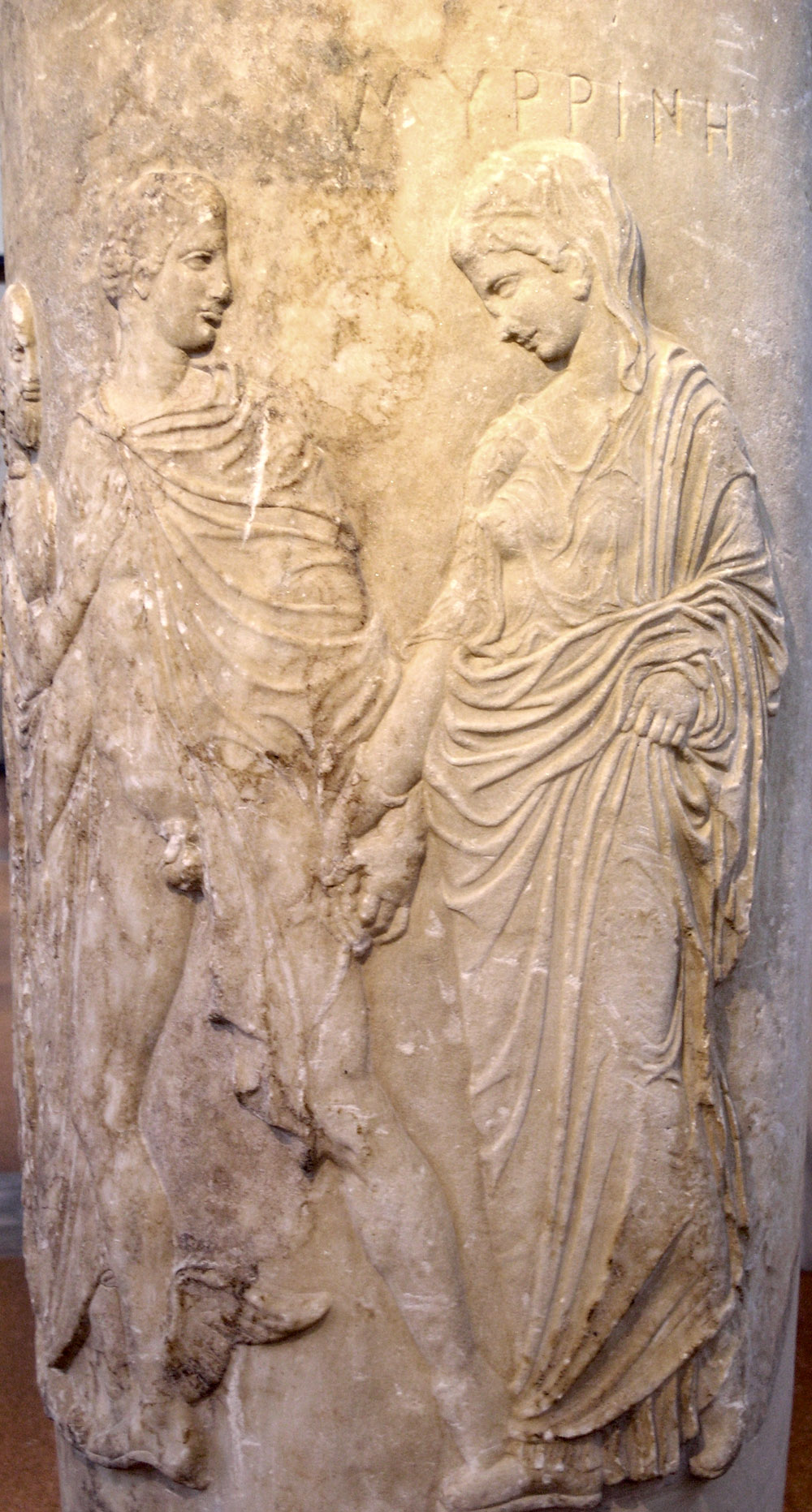
Relief from a carved funerary lekythos at the National Archaeological Museum of Athens: Hermes conducts the deceased, Myrrhine, to Hades, c. 430–420 BCE

During the Iron Age, the ancient Greeks did not generally leave elaborate grave goods, except for a coin to pay Charon, the ferryman to Hades, and pottery; however the epitaphios or funeral oration from which the word epitaph comes was regarded as of great importance, and animal sacrifices were made. Those who could afford them erected stone monuments, which was one of the functions of kouros statues in the Archaic period before about 500 BCE. These were not intended as portraits, but during the Hellenistic period, realistic portraiture of the deceased was introduced and family groups were often depicted in bas-relief on monuments, usually surrounded by an architectural frame. The walls of tomb chambers were often painted in fresco, although few examples have survived in as good condition as the Tomb of the Diver from southern Italy or the tombs at Vergina in Macedon. Almost the only surviving painted portraits in the classical Greek tradition are found in Egypt rather than Greece. The Fayum mummy portraits, from the very end of the classical period, were portrait faces, in a Graeco-Roman style, attached to mummies.

Early Greek burials were frequently marked above ground by a large piece of pottery, and remains were also buried in urns. Pottery continued to be used extensively inside tombs and graves throughout the classical period. The great majority of surviving ancient Greek pottery is recovered from tombs; some was apparently items used in life, but much of it was made specifically for placing in tombs, and the balance between the two original purposes is controversial. The larnax is a small coffin or ash-chest, usually of decorated terracotta. The two-handled loutrophoros was primarily associated with weddings, as it was used to carry water for the nuptial bath. However, it was also placed in the tombs of the unmarried, "presumably to make up in some way for what they had missed in life." The one-handled lekythos had many household uses, but outside the household, its principal use was the decoration of tombs. Scenes of a descent to the underworld of Hades were often painted on these, with the dead depicted beside Hermes, Charon or both—though usually only with Charon. Small pottery figurines are often found, though it is hard to decide if these were made especially for placement in tombs; in the case of the Hellenistic Tanagra figurines, this seems probably not the case. But silverware is more often found around the fringes of the Greek world, as in the royal Macedonian tombs of Vergina, or in the neighbouring cultures such as those of Thrace or the Scythians.

The extension of the Greek world after the conquests of Alexander the Great brought peoples with different tomb-making traditions into the Hellenistic sphere, resulting in new formats for art in Greek styles. A generation before Alexander, Mausolus was a Hellenized satrap or semi-independent ruler under the Persian Empire, whose enormous tomb (begun 353 BCE) was wholly exceptional in the Greek world—together with the Pyramids it was the only tomb to be included in the Seven Wonders of the Ancient World. The exact form of the Mausoleum of Halicarnassus, which gave the name to the form, is now unclear, and there are several alternative reconstructions that seek to reconcile the archaeological evidence with descriptions in literature. It had the size and some elements of the design of the Greek temple, but was much more vertical, with a square base and a pyramidal roof. There were quantities of large sculpture, of which most of the few surviving pieces are now in the British Museum. Other local rulers adapted the high-relief temple frieze for very large sarcophagi, starting a tradition which was to exert a great influence on Western art up to 18th-century Neo-Classicism. The late 4th-century Alexander Sarcophagus was in fact made for another Hellenized Eastern ruler, one of a number of important sarcophagi found at Sidon in the modern Lebanon. The two long sides show Alexander's great victory at the Battle of Issus and a lion hunt; such violent scenes were common on ostentatious classical sarcophagi from this period onwards, with a particular revival in Roman art of the 2nd century. More peaceful mythological scenes were popular on smaller sarcophagi, especially of Bacchus.

=== Etruscans ===
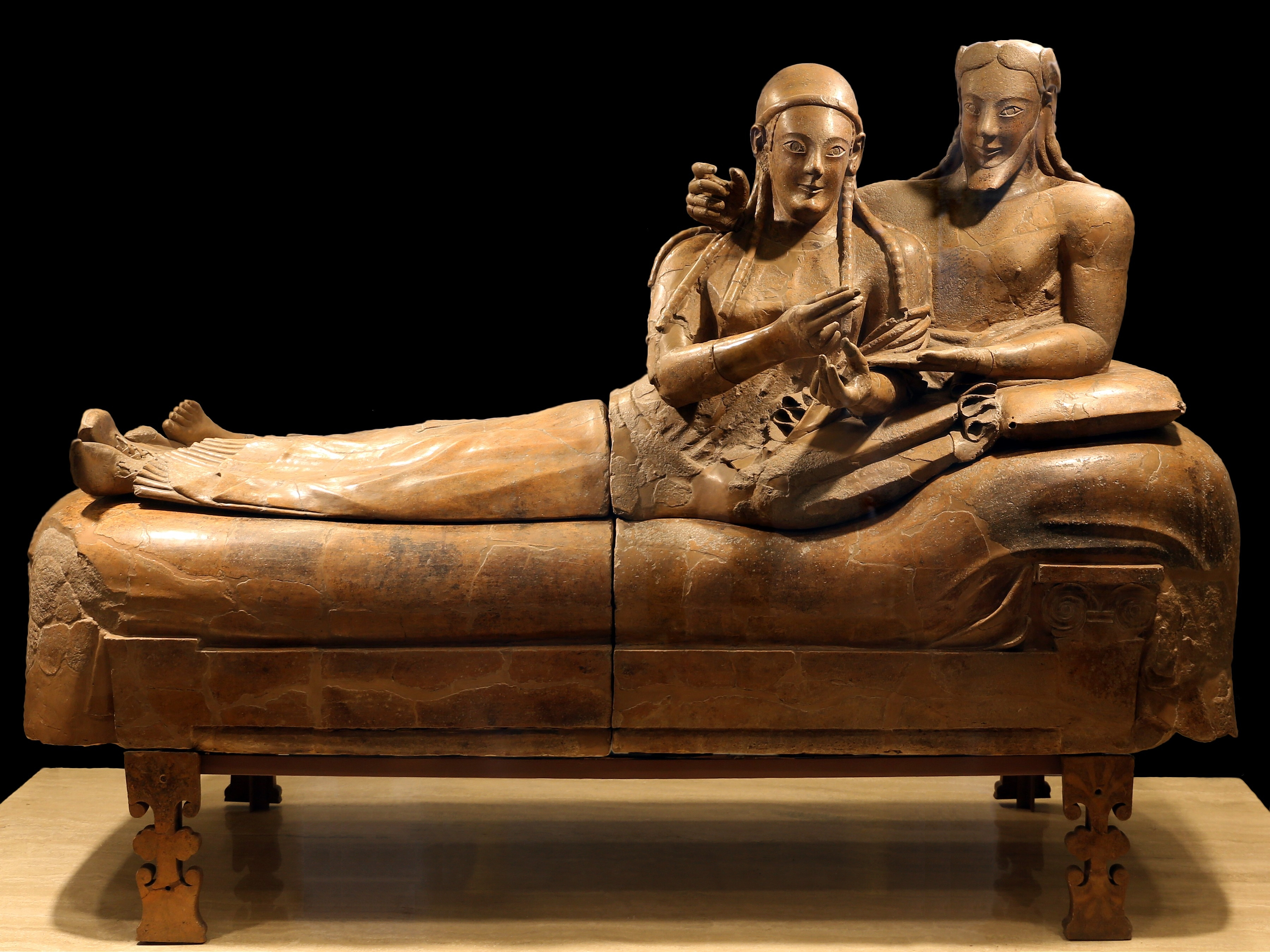
The Etruscan Sarcophagus of the Spouses (late 6th century BCE), at the National Etruscan Museum in Rome

Objects connected with death, in particular sarcophagi and cinerary urns, form the basis of much of current knowledge of the ancient Etruscan civilization and its art, which once competed with the culture of ancient Rome, but was eventually absorbed into it. The sarcophagi and the lids of the urns often incorporate a reclining image of the deceased. The reclining figures in some Etruscan funerary art are shown using the mano cornuta to protect the grave.

The main subject in the funerary art of the 7th and 6th centuries BCE was typically a feasting scene, sometimes with dancers and musicians, or athletic competitions. Household bowls, cups, and pitchers are sometimes found in the graves, along with food such as eggs, pomegranates, honey, grapes and olives for use in the afterlife. From the 5th century, the mood changed to more sombre scenes of parting, where the deceased are shown leaving their loved ones, often surrounded by underworld demons, and psychopomps, such as Charun or the winged female Vanth. The underworld figures are sometimes depicted as gesturing impatiently for a human to be taken away. The handshake was another common motif, as the dead took leave of the living. This often took place in front of or near a closed double doorway, presumably the portal to the underworld. Evidence in some art, however, suggests that the "handshake took place at the other end of the journey, and represents the dead being greeted in the Underworld".

=== Ancient Rome ===
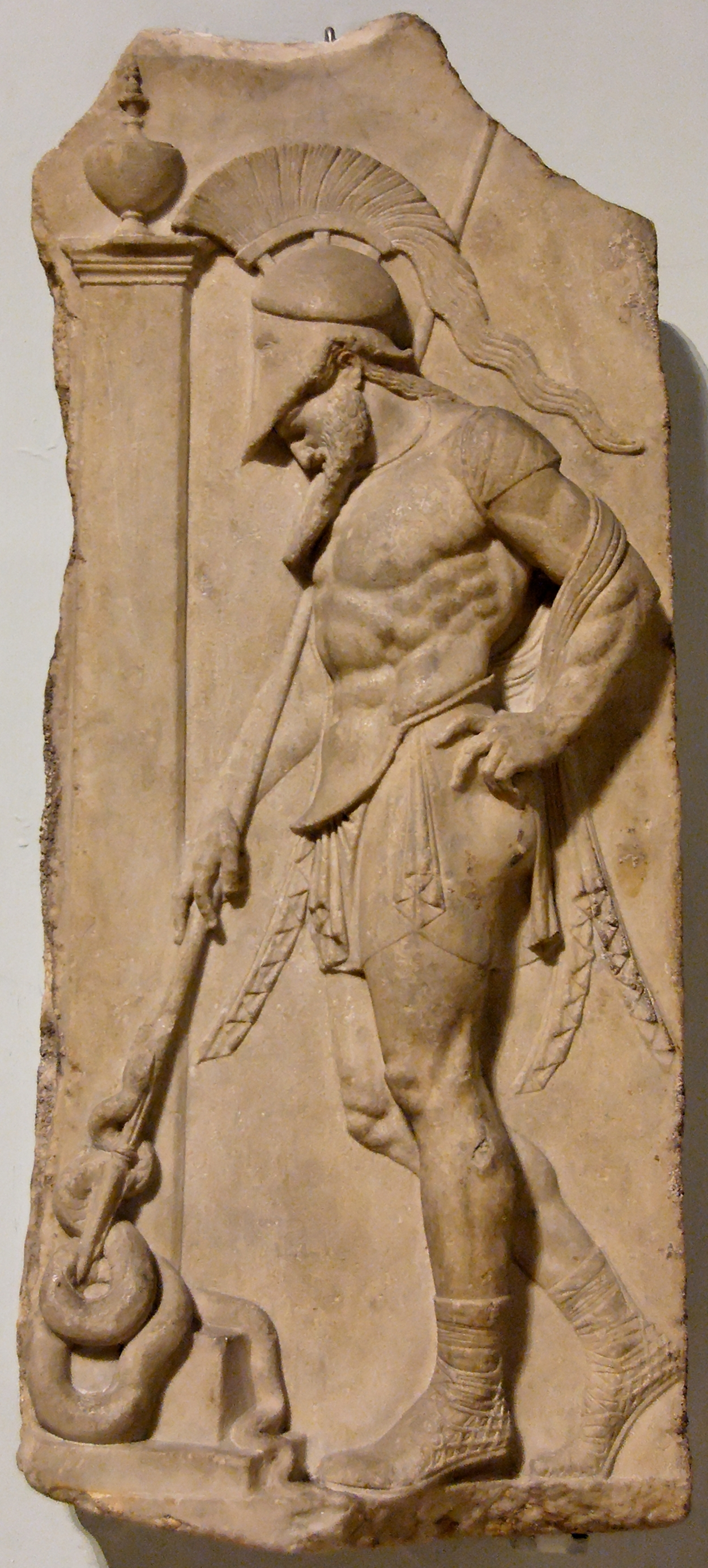
Warrior with cuirass and helmet leaning on his spear in front of a funerary stele; the snake symbolizes the soul of the dead. Marble, Roman, 1st century BCE, imitating the Greek classical style of the 5th century BCE. From Rhodes.

The burial customs of the ancient Romans were influenced by both of the first significant cultures whose territories they conquered as their state expanded, namely the Greeks of Magna Graecia and the Etruscans. The original Roman custom was cremation, after which the burnt remains were kept in a pot, ash-chest or urn, often in a columbarium; pre-Roman burials around Rome often used hut-urns—little pottery houses. From about the 2nd century CE, inhumation (burial of unburnt remains) in sarcophagi, often elaborately carved, became more fashionable for those who could afford it. Greek-style medallion portrait sculptures on a stela, or small mausoleum for the rich, housing either an urn or sarcophagus, were often placed in a location such as a roadside, where it would be very visible to the living and perpetuate the memory of the dead. Often a couple are shown, signifying a longing for reunion in the afterlife rather than a double burial (see married couple funerary reliefs).

In later periods, life-size sculptures of the deceased reclining as though at a meal or social gathering are found, a common Etruscan style. Family tombs for the grandest late Roman families, like the Tomb of the Scipios, were large mausoleums with facilities for visits by the living, including kitchens and bedrooms. The Castel Sant'Angelo, built for Hadrian, was later converted into a fortress. Compared to the Etruscans, though, there was less emphasis on provision of a lifestyle for the deceased, although paintings of useful objects or pleasant activities, like hunting, are seen. Ancestor portraits, usually in the form of wax masks, were kept in the home, apparently often in little cupboards, although grand patrician families kept theirs on display in the atrium. They were worn in the funeral processions of members of the family by persons wearing appropriate costume for the figure represented, as described by Pliny the Elder and Polybius. Pliny also describes the custom of having a bust-portrait of an ancestor painted on a round bronze shield (clipeus), and having it hung in a temple or other public place. No examples of either type have survived.

By the late Republic there was considerable competition among wealthy Romans for the best locations for tombs, which lined all the approach roads to the city up to the walls, and a variety of exotic and unusual designs sought to catch the attention of the passer-by and so perpetuate the memory of the deceased and increase the prestige of their family. Examples include the Tomb of Eurysaces the Baker, a freedman, the Pyramid of Cestius, and the Mausoleum of Caecilia Metella, all built within a few decades of the start of the Common Era.

In Italy, sarcophagi were mostly intended to be set against the wall of the tomb, and only decorated on three sides, in contrast to the free-standing styles of Greece and the Eastern Empire. The relief scenes of Hellenistic art became even more densely crowded in later Roman sarcophagi, as for example in the 2nd-century Portonaccio sarcophagus, and various styles and forms emerged, such as the columnar type with an "architectural background of columns and niches for its figures". A well-known Early Christian example is the Sarcophagus of Junius Bassus, used for an important new convert who died in 359. Many sarcophagi from leading centres were exported around the Empire. The Romans had already developed the expression of religious and philosophical ideas in narrative scenes from Greek mythology, treated allegorically; they later transferred this habit to Christian ideas, using biblical scenes.

=== China ===
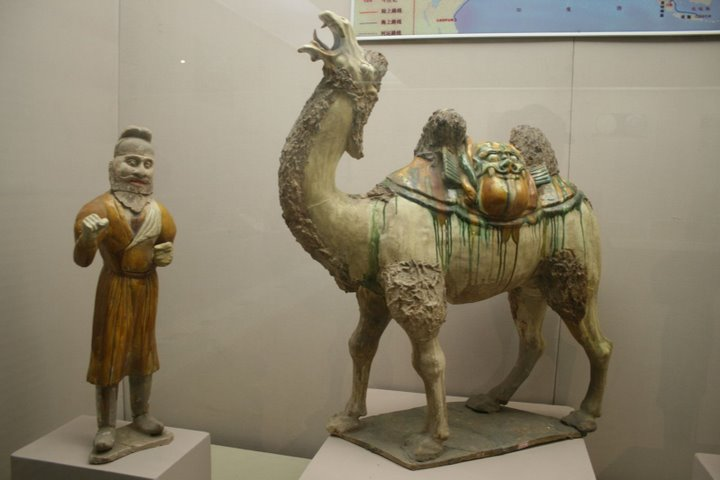
Tang dynasty tomb figure, sancai glazes, of a Bactrian camel and its foreign driver

Funerary art varied greatly across Chinese history. Tombs of early rulers rival the ancient Egyptians for complexity and value of grave goods, and have been similarly pillaged over the centuries by tomb robbers. For a long time, literary references to jade burial suits were regarded by scholars as fanciful myths, but a number of examples were excavated in the 20th century, and it is now believed that they were relatively common among early rulers. Knowledge of pre-dynastic Chinese culture has been expanded by spectacular discoveries at Sanxingdui and other sites. Very large tumuli could be erected, and later, mausoleums. Several special large shapes of Shang dynasty bronze ritual vessels were probably made for burial only; large numbers were buried in elite tombs, while other sets remained above ground for the family to use in making offerings in ancestor veneration rituals. The Tomb of Fu Hao (c. BCE 1200) is one of the few undisturbed royal tombs of the period to have been excavated—most funerary art has appeared on the art market without archaeological context.

The discovery in 1974 of the Terracotta Army located the tomb of the First Qin Emperor (died 210 BCE), but the main tumulus, of which literary descriptions survive, has not been excavated. Remains surviving above ground from several imperial tombs of the Han dynasty show traditions maintained until the end of imperial rule. The tomb itself is an "underground palace" beneath a sealed tumulus surrounded by a wall, with several buildings set at some distance away down avenues for the observation of rites of veneration, and the accommodation of both permanent staff and those visiting to perform rites, as well as gateways, towers and other buildings.

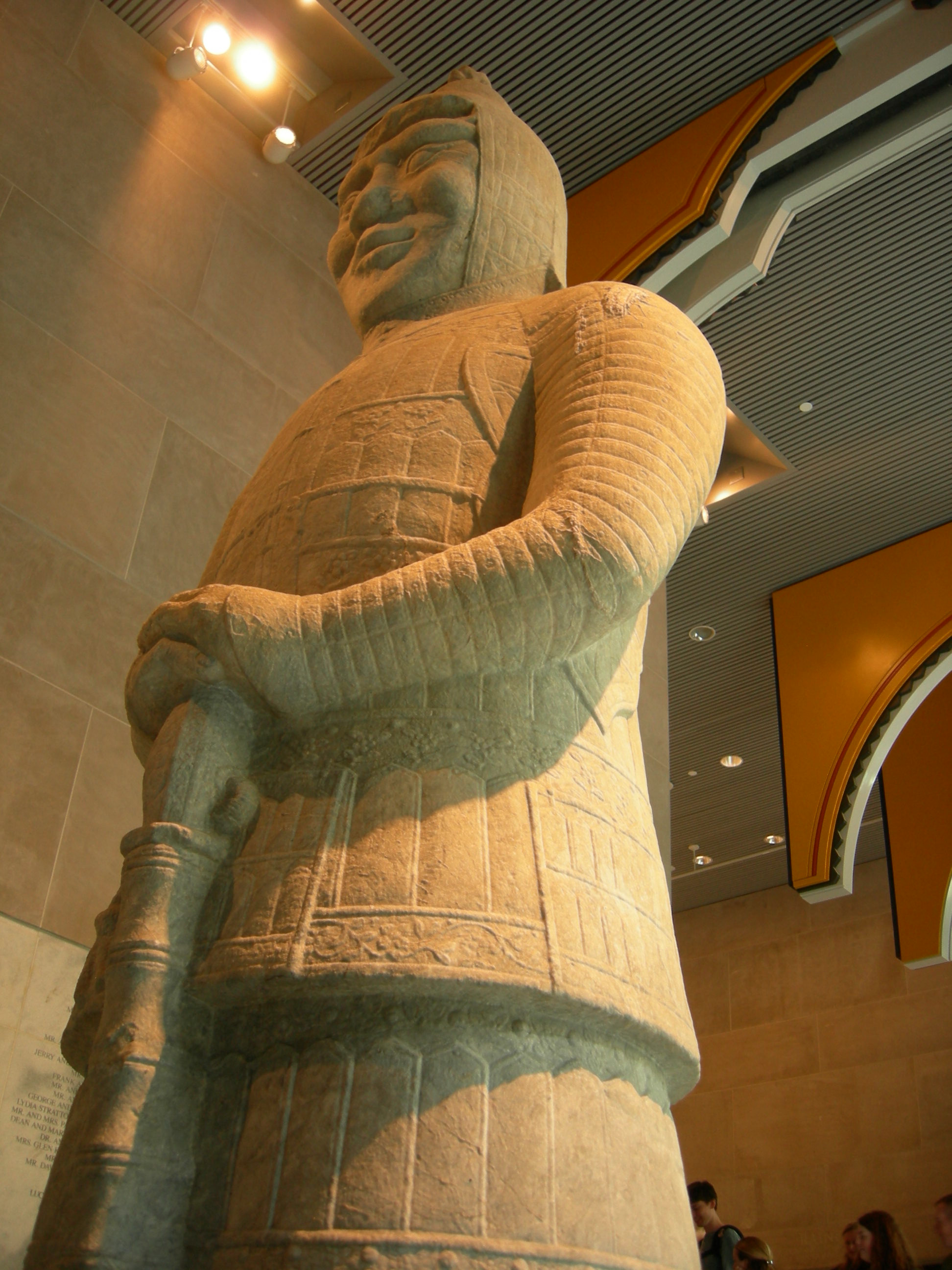
"Military Guardian", Chinese funerary statue. Seattle Art Museum, Seattle, Washington.

Tang dynasty tomb figures, in "three-colour" sancai glazes or overglaze paint, show a wide range of servants, entertainers, animals and fierce tomb guardians between about 12 and 120 cm high, and were arranged around the tomb, often in niches along the sloping access path to the underground chamber.

Chinese imperial tombs are typically approached by a "spirit road", sometimes several kilometres long, lined by statues of guardian figures, based on both humans and animals. A tablet extolling the virtues of the deceased, mounted on a stone representation of Bixi in the form of a tortoise, is often the centerpiece of the ensemble. In Han tombs the guardian figures are mainly of "lions" and "chimeras"; in later periods they are much more varied. A looted tomb with fine paintings is the Empress Dowager Wenming tomb of the 5th century CE, and the many tombs of the 7th-century Tang dynasty Qianling Mausoleum group are an early example of a generally well-preserved ensemble.

The Goguryeo tombs, from a kingdom of the 5th to 7th centuries which included modern Korea, are especially rich in paintings. Only one of the Imperial Tombs of the Ming and Qing Dynasties has been excavated, in 1956, with such disastrous results for the conservation of the thousands of objects found, that subsequently the policy is to leave them undisturbed.

The Lei Cheng Uk Han Tomb Museum in Hong Kong displays a far humbler middle-class Han dynasty tomb, and the mid-2nd-century Wu Family tombs of Jiaxiang County, Shandong are the most important group of commoner tombs for funerary stones. The walls of both the offering and burial chambers of tombs of commoners from the Han period may be decorated with stone slabs carved or engraved in very low relief with crowded and varied scenes, which are now the main indication of the style of the lost palace frescoes of the period. A cheaper option was to use large clay tiles which were carved or impressed before firing. After the introduction of Buddhism, carved "funerary couches" featured similar scenes, now mostly religious. During the Han dynasty, miniature ceramic models of buildings were often made to accompany the deceased in the graves; to them is owed much of what is known of ancient Chinese architecture. Later, during the Six Dynasties, sculptural miniatures depicting buildings, monuments, people and animals adorned the tops of the hunping funerary vessels. The outsides of tombs often featured monumental brick or stone-carved pillar-gates (que 闕); an example from 121 CE appears to be the earliest surviving Chinese architectural structure standing above ground. Tombs of the Tang dynasty (618–907) are often rich in glazed pottery figurines of horses, servants and other subjects, whose forceful and free style is greatly admired today. The tomb art reached its peak in the Song and Jin periods; most spectacular tombs were built by rich commoners.

Early burial customs show a strong belief in an afterlife and a spirit path to it that needed facilitating. Funerals and memorials were also an opportunity to reaffirm such important cultural values as filial piety and "the honor and respect due to seniors, the duties incumbent on juniors" The common Chinese funerary symbol of a woman in the door may represent a "basic male fantasy of an elysian afterlife with no restrictions: in all the doorways of the houses stand available women looking for newcomers to welcome into their chambers" Han dynasty inscriptions often describe the filial mourning for their subjects.

=== Korea ===
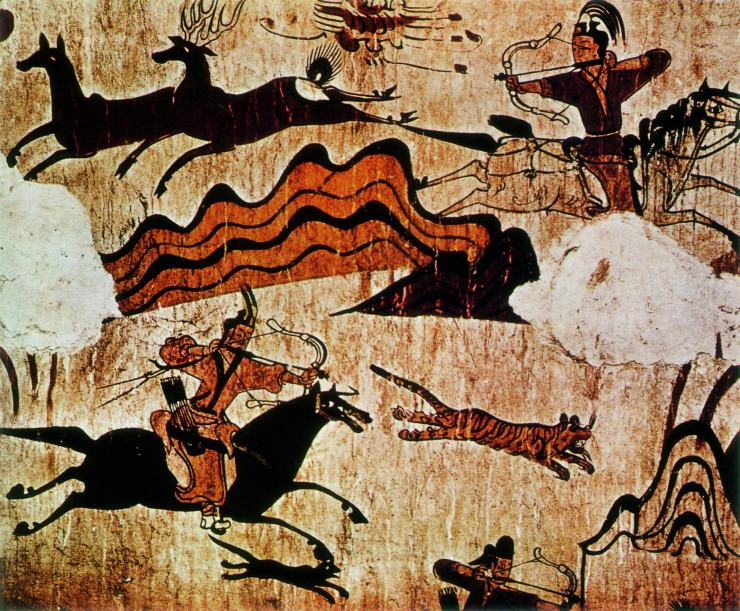
Hunting scene from the North wall of the main chamber of the Muyongchong Tomb (Tomb of the Dancers), (5th century CE), Ji'an.

Murals painted on the walls of the Goguryeo tombs are examples of Korean painting from its Three Kingdoms era. Although thousands of these tombs have been found, only about 100 have murals. These tombs are often named for the dominating theme of the murals—these include the Tomb of the Dancers, the Tomb of the Hunters, the Tomb of the Four Spirits, and the Tomb of the Wrestlers. Heavenly bodies are a common motif, as are depictions of events from the lives of the royalty and nobles whose bodies had been entombed. The former include the sun, represented as a three-legged bird inside a wheel, and the various constellations, including especially the Four directional constellations: the Azure Dragon of the East, the Vermilion Bird of the South, the White Tiger of the West, and the Black Tortoise of the North.

The Royal Tombs of the Joseon Dynasty in Korea, built between 1408 and 1966, reflect a combination of Chinese and Japanese traditions, with a tomb mound, often surrounded by a screen wall of stone blocks, and sometimes with stone animal figures above ground, not unlike the Japanese haniwa figures (see below). There is usually one or more T-shaped shrine buildings some distance in front of the tomb, which is set in extensive grounds, usually with a hill behind them, and facing a view towards water and distant hills. They are still a focus for ancestor worship rituals. From the 15th century, they became more simple, while retaining a large landscape setting.

=== Japan ===
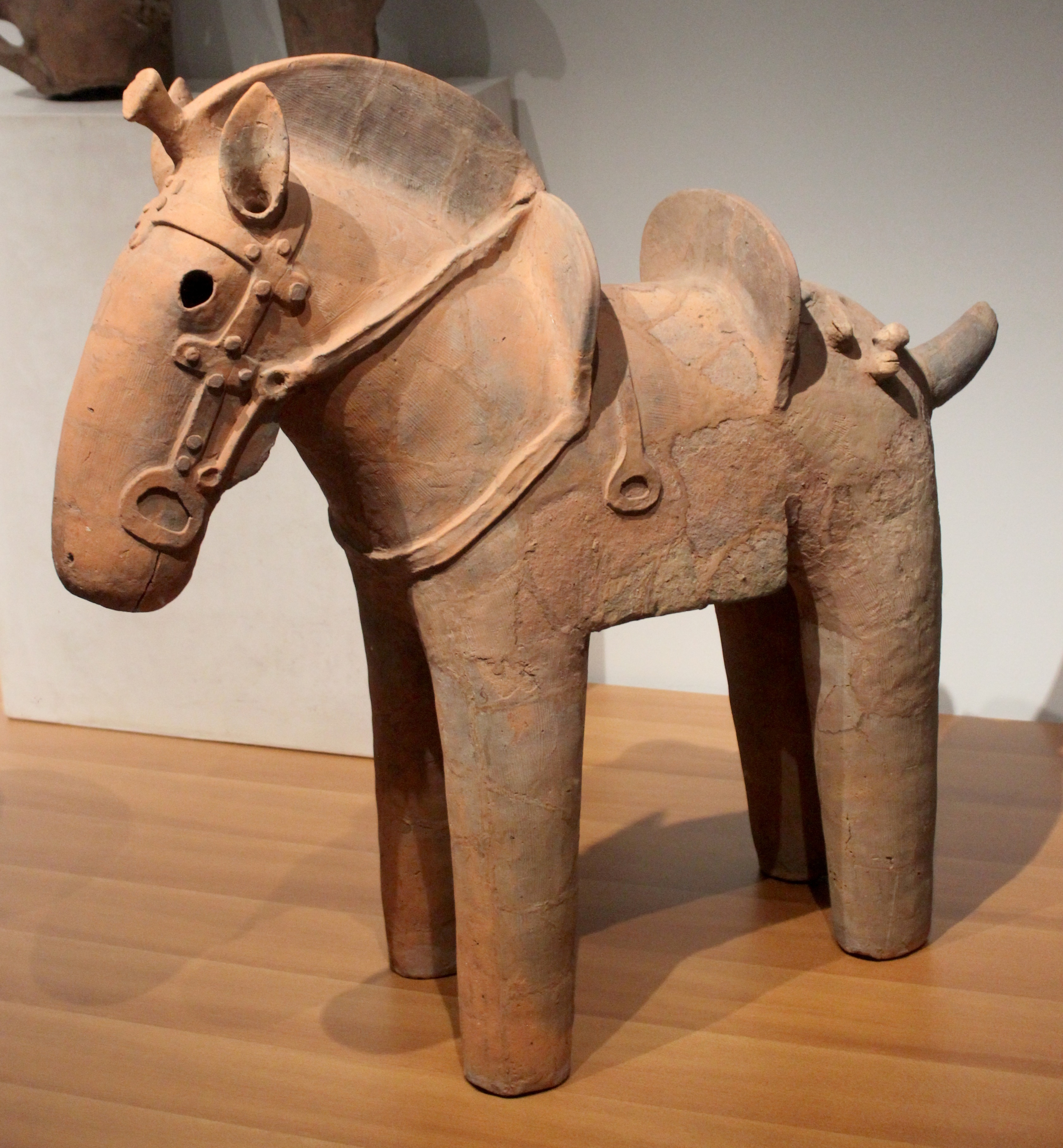
6th-century Japanese haniwa clay figure; these were buried with the dead in the Kofun period (3rd to 6th centuries CE)

The Kofun period of Japanese history, from the 3rd to 6th centuries CE, is named after kofun, the often enormous keyhole-shaped Imperial mound-tombs, often on a moated island. None of these have ever been allowed to be excavated, so their possibly spectacular contents remain unknown. Late examples which have been investigated, such as the Kitora Tomb, had been robbed of most of their contents, but the Takamatsuzuka Tomb retains mural paintings. Lower down the social scale in the same period, terracotta haniwa figures, as much as a metre high, were deposited on top of aristocratic tombs as grave markers, with others left inside, apparently representing possessions such as horses and houses for use in the afterlife. Both kofun mounds and haniwa figures appear to have been discontinued as Buddhism became the dominant Japanese religion.

Since then, Japanese tombs have been typically marked by elegant but simple rectangular vertical gravestones with inscriptions. Funerals are one of the areas in Japanese life where Buddhist customs are followed even by those who followed other traditions, such as Shinto. The bodaiji is a special and very common type of temple whose main purpose is as a venue for rites of ancestor worship, though it is often not the actual burial site. This was originally a custom of the feudal lords, but was adopted by other classes from about the 16th century. Each family would use a particular bodaiji over generations, and it might contain a second "grave" if the actual burial were elsewhere. Many later emperors, from the 13th to 19th centuries, are buried simply at the Imperial bodaiji, the Tsuki no wa no misasagi mausoleum in the Sennyū-ji temple at Kyoto.

=== The Americas ===
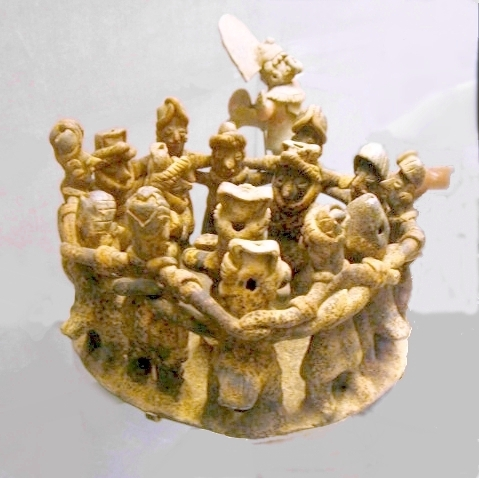
A "shaft tomb" tableau from Nayarit, Mexico, 300 BCE to CE 600

Unlike many Western cultures, that of Mesoamerica is generally lacking in sarcophagi, with a few notable exceptions such as that of Pacal the Great or the now-lost sarcophagus from the Olmec site of La Venta. Instead, most Mesoamerican funerary art takes the form of grave goods and, in Oaxaca, funerary urns holding the ashes of the deceased. Two well-known examples of Mesoamerican grave goods are those from Jaina Island, a Maya site off the coast of Campeche, and those associated with the Western Mexico shaft tomb tradition. The tombs of Mayan rulers can only normally be identified by inferences drawn from the lavishness of the grave goods and, with the possible exception of vessels made from stone rather than pottery, these appear to contain no objects specially made for the burial.

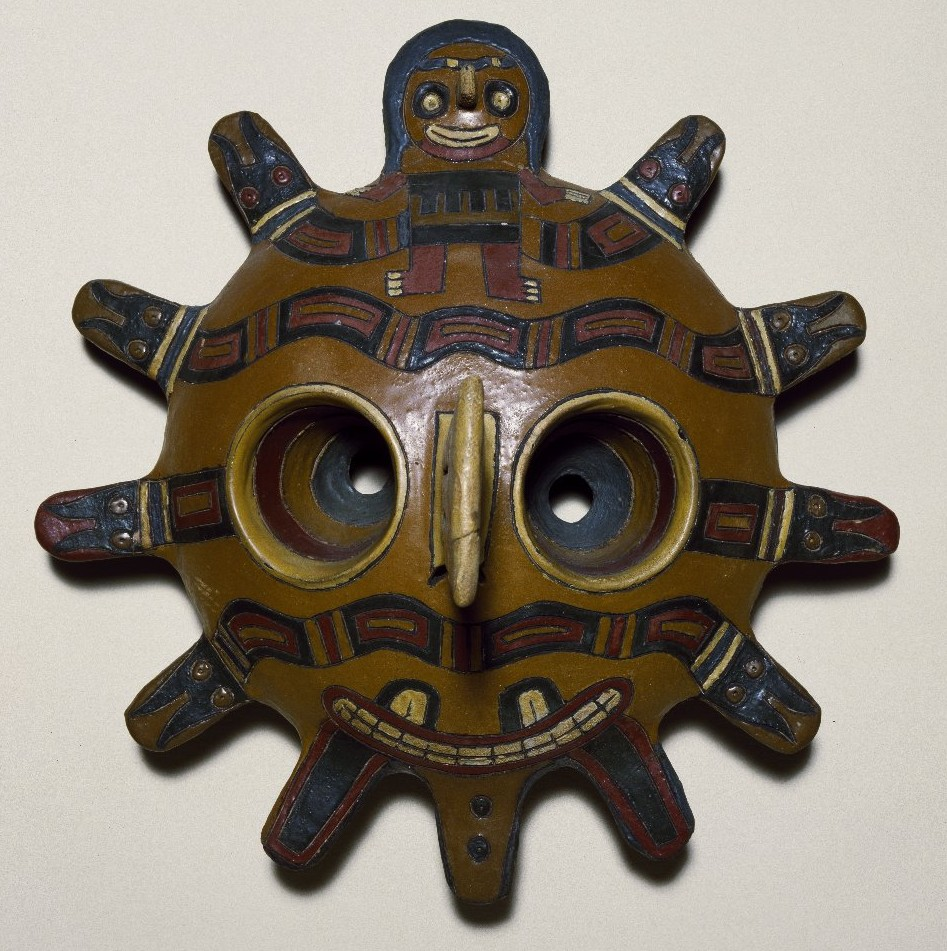
Funerary Mask, c. 300 BCE, painted ceramic

The Jaina Island graves are noted for their abundance of clay figurines. Human remains within the roughly 1,000 excavated graves on the island (out of 20,000 total) were found to be accompanied by glassware, slateware, or pottery, as well as one or more ceramic figurines, usually resting on the occupant's chest or held in their hands. The function of these figurines is not known: due to gender and age mismatches, they are unlikely to be portraits of the grave occupants, although the later figurines are known to be representations of goddesses.

The so-called shaft tomb tradition of western Mexico is known almost exclusively from grave goods, which include hollow ceramic figures, obsidian and shell jewelry, pottery, and other items (see this Flickr photo for a reconstruction). Of particular note are the various ceramic tableaux including village scenes, for example, players engaged in a Mesoamerican ballgame. Although these tableaux may merely depict village life, it has been proposed that they instead (or also) depict the underworld. Ceramic dogs are also widely known from looted tombs, and are thought by some to represent psychopomps (soul guides), although dogs were often the major source of protein in ancient Mesoamerica.

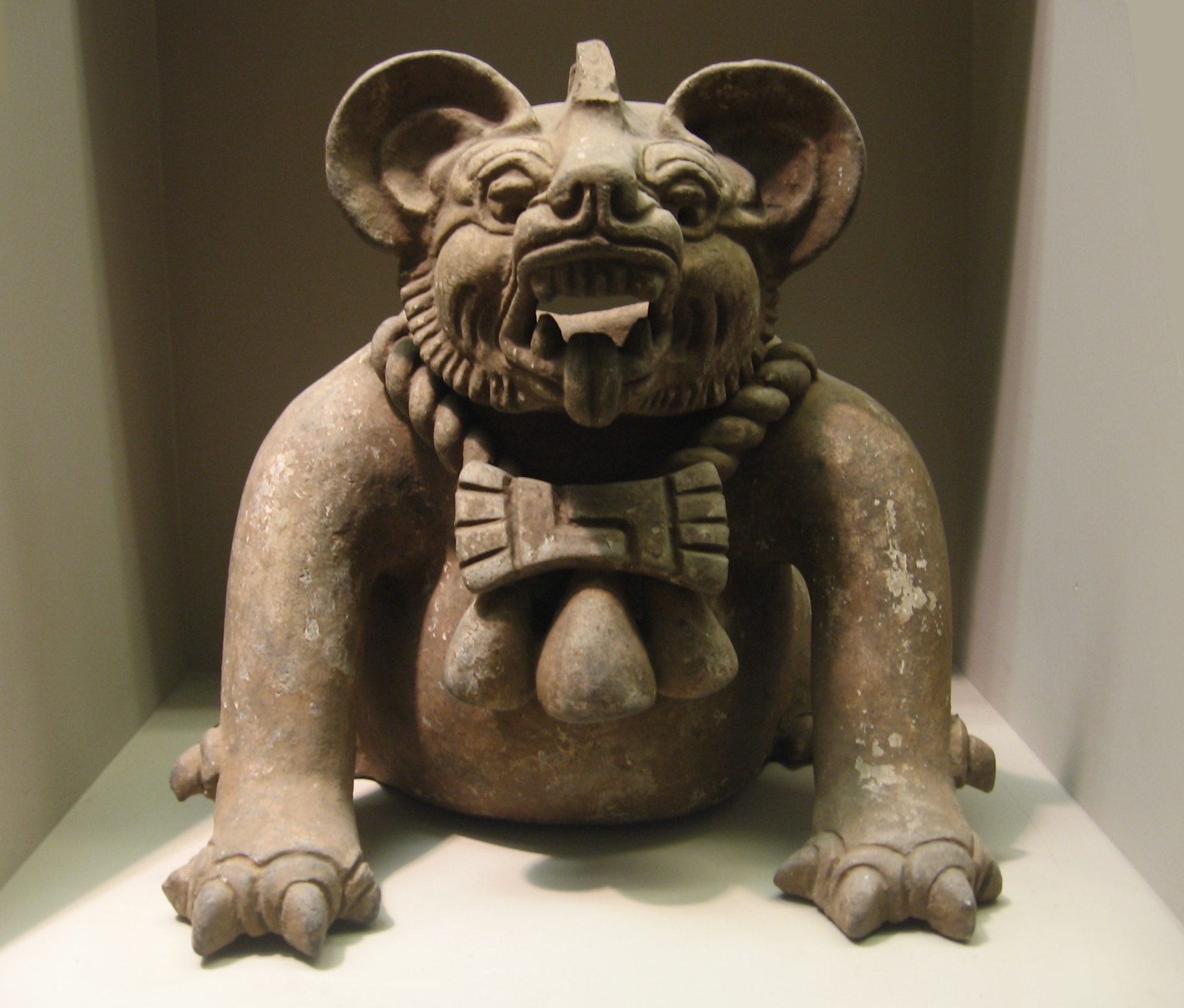
A funerary urn in the shape of a "bat god" or a jaguar, from Oaxaca, dated to CE 300–650.

The Zapotec civilization of Oaxaca is particularly known for its clay funerary urns, such as the "bat god" shown at right. Numerous types of urns have been identified. While some show deities and other supernatural beings, others seem to be portraits. Art historian George Kubler is particularly enthusiastic about the craftsmanship of this tradition:

No other American potters ever explored so completely the plastic conditions of wet clay or retained its forms so completely after firing ... [they] used its wet and ductile nature for fundamental geometric modelling and cut the material, when half-dry, into smooth planes with sharp edges of an unmatched brilliance and suggestiveness of form.

The Maya Naj Tunich cave tombs and other sites contain paintings, carved stelae, and grave goods in pottery, jade and metal, including death masks. In dry areas, many ancient textiles have been found in graves from South America's Paracas culture, which wrapped its mummies tightly in several layers of elaborately patterned cloth. Elite Moche graves, containing especially fine pottery, were incorporated into large adobe structures also used for human sacrifices, such as the Huaca de la Luna. Andean cultures such as the Sican often practiced mummification and left grave goods in precious metals with jewels, including tumi ritual knives and gold funerary masks, as well as pottery. The Mimbres of the Mogollon culture buried their dead with bowls on top of their heads and ceremonially "killed" each bowl with a small hole in the centre so that the deceased's spirit could rise to another world. Mimbres funerary bowls show scenes of hunting, gambling, planting crops, fishing, sexual acts and births. Some of the North American mounds, such as Grave Creek Mound (c. 250–150 BCE) in West Virginia, functioned as burial sites, while others had different purposes.

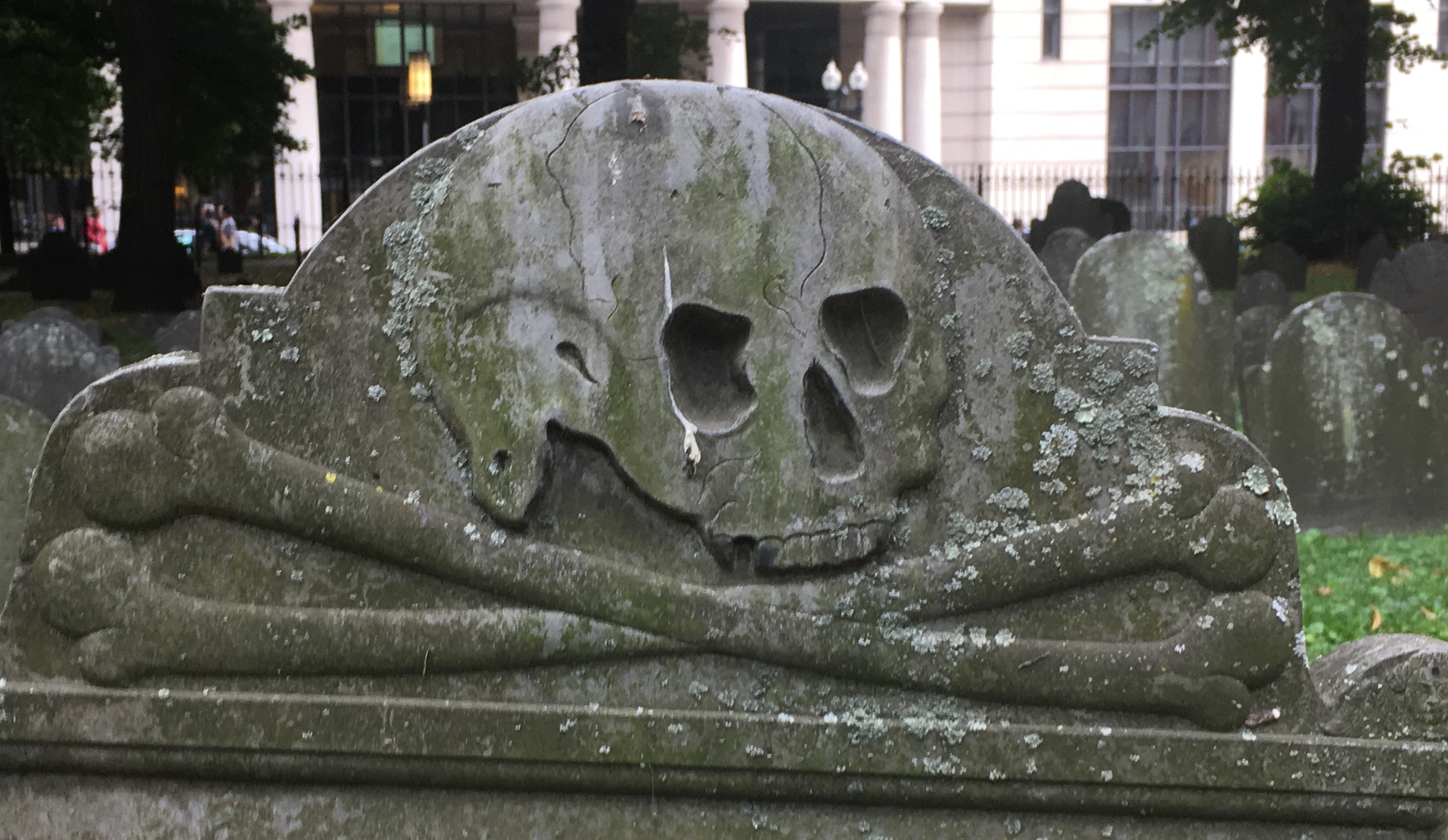
Death's head, Boston MA

The earliest colonist graves were either unmarked or had very simple timber headstones, with little order to their plotting, reflecting their Puritan origins. However, a tradition of visual funerary art developed from c. 1640, providing insights into their views of death. The lack of artistry of the earliest known headstones reflects the Puritans' stern religious doctrine. Late seventeenth-century examples often show a death's head: a stylised skull, sometimes with wings or crossed bones, and other realistic imagery depicting humans decaying into skulls, bones and dust. The style softened during the late 18th century as Unitarianism and Methodism became more popular. Mid-18th-century examples often show the deceased carried by wings that would apparently take the souls to heaven.

== Traditional societies ==
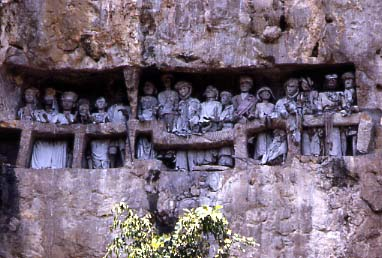
A stone-carved Toraja cliff burial site. Tau tau (effigies of the deceased) look out over the land.

There is an enormous diversity of funeral art from traditional societies across the world, much of it in perishable materials, and some is mentioned elsewhere in the article. In traditional African societies, masks often have a specific association with death, and some types may be worn mainly or exclusively for funeral ceremonies. Akan peoples of West Africa commissioned nsodie memorial heads of royal personages. The funeral ceremonies of the Indigenous Australians typically feature body painting; the Yolngu and Tiwi people create carved pukumani burial poles from ironwood trunks, while elaborately carved burial trees have been used in south-eastern Australia. The Toraja people of central Sulawesi are famous for their burial practices, which include the setting-up of effigies of the dead on cliffs. The 19th- and 20th-century royal Kasubi Tombs in Uganda, destroyed by fire in 2010, were a circular compound of thatched buildings similar to those inhabited by the earlier Kabakas when alive, but with special characteristics.

In several cultures, goods for use in the afterlife are still interred or cremated, for example Hell bank notes in East Asian communities. In Ghana, mostly among the Ga people, elaborate figurative coffins in the shape of cars, boats or animals are made of wood. These were introduced in the 1950s by Seth Kane Kwei.

== Funerary art and religion ==
=== Hinduism ===
Cremation is traditional among Hindus, who also believe in reincarnation, and there is far less of a tradition of funerary monuments in Hinduism than in other major religions. However, there are regional, and relatively recent, traditions among royalty, and the samādhi mandir is a memorial temple for a saint. Both may be influenced by Islamic practices. The mausoleums of the kings of Orchha, from the 16th century onwards, are among the best known. Other rulers were commemorated by memorial temples of the normal type for the time and place, which like similar buildings from other cultures fall outside the scope of this article, though Angkor Wat in Cambodia, the most spectacular of all, must be mentioned.

=== Buddhism ===
Buddhist tombs themselves are typically simple and modest, although they may be set within temples, sometimes large complexes, built for the purpose in the then-prevailing style. According to tradition, the remains of the Buddha's body after cremation were entirely divided up into relics (cetiya), which played an important part in early Buddhism. The stupa developed as a monument enclosing deposits of relics of the Buddha from plain hemispherical mounds in the 3rd century BCE to elaborate structures such as those at Sanchi in India and Borobudur in Java. Regional variants such as the pagoda of China and Japan and the candi of Indonesia evolved from the Indian form. However, none of these can strictly be called tombs. Some important Tibetan lamas are buried in relatively small chortens (Tibetan stupas), sometimes of precious metal, inside or outside monasteries, sometimes after mummification. There are examples at Kursha Monastery in Zanskar and Tashiding Monastery in Sikkim, as well as the Potala Palace in Lhasa and many other monasteries. However, most chortens do not function as tombs.

=== Christianity ===
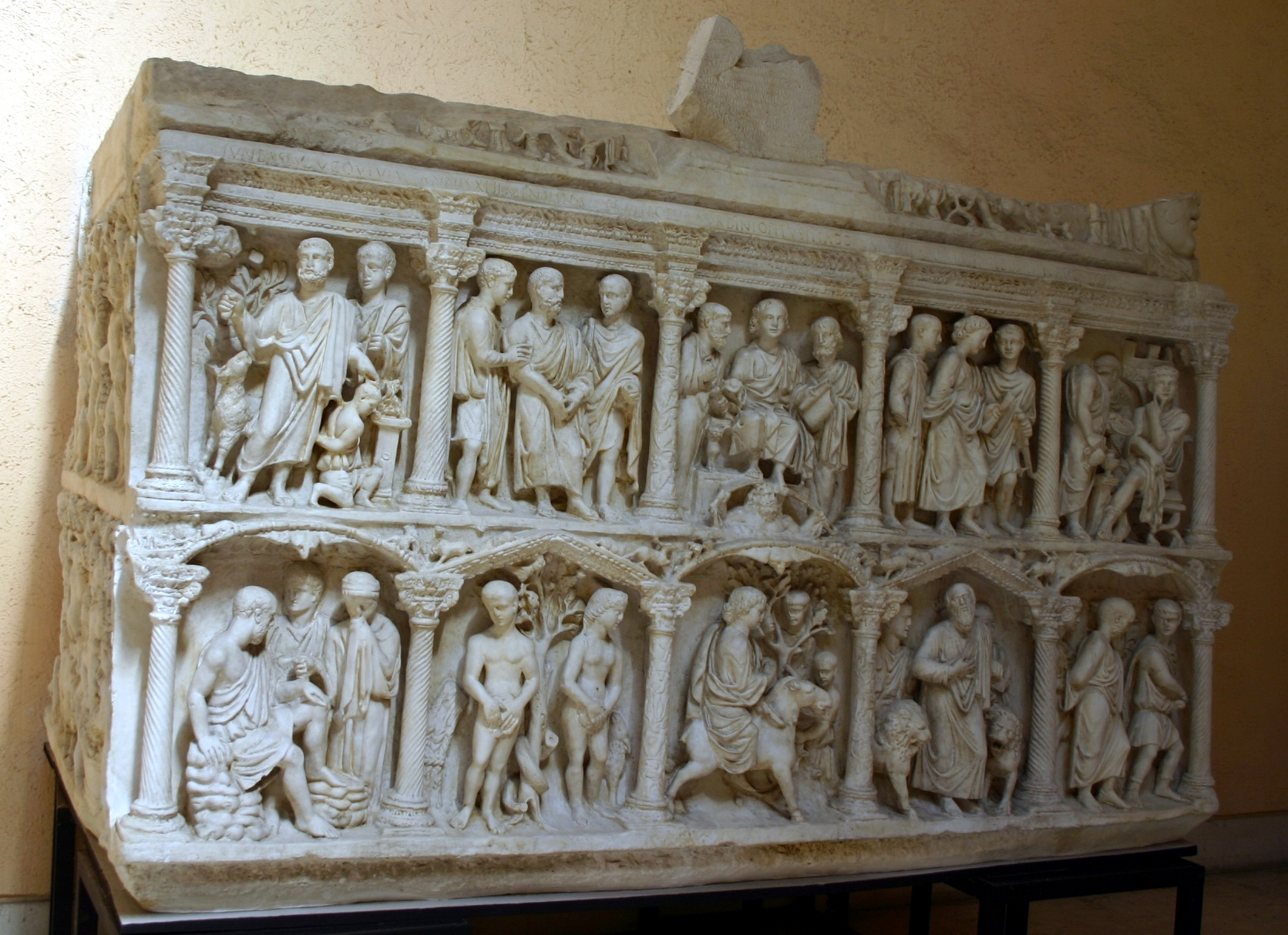
Plaster cast of the Sarcophagus of Junius Bassus

The Catacombs of Rome contain most of the surviving Christian art of the Early Christian period, mainly in the form of frescos and sculpted sarcophagi. They show a Christian iconography emerging, initially from Roman popular decorative art, but later borrowing from official imperial and pagan motifs. Initially, Christians avoided iconic images of religious figures, and sarcophagi were decorated with ornaments, Christian symbols like the Chi Rho monogram and, later, narrative religious scenes. The Early Christians' habit, after the end of their persecution, of building churches (most famously St Peter's, Rome) over the burial places of martyrs who had originally been buried discreetly or in a mass grave perhaps led to the most distinctive feature of Christian funerary art, the church monument, or tomb inside a church. The beliefs of many cultures, including Judaism and Hinduism as well as classical paganism, consider the dead ritually impure and avoid mixing temples and cemeteries (though see above for Moche, and below for Islamic culture). An exception in the Classical World were the Lycians of Anatolia. There are also the Egyptian mortuary-temples, where the object of worship was the deified royal person entombed, but Egyptian temples to the major gods contained no burials. An extreme example was ancient Delos.

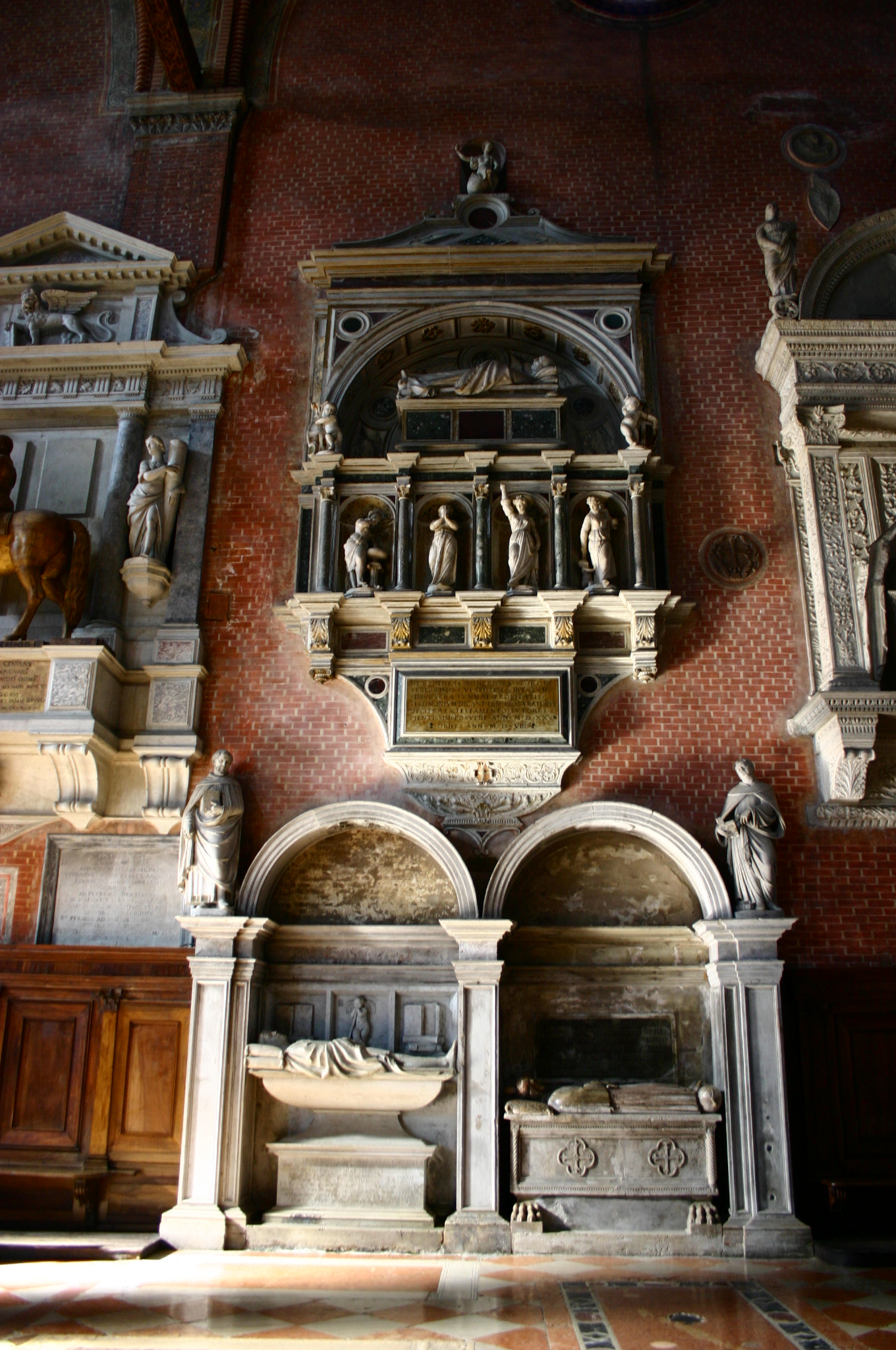
Medieval and Renaissance wall tombs in Santi Giovanni e Paolo, Venice, including an equestrian statue at the left

Christians believed in a bodily resurrection of the dead at the Second Coming of Christ, and the Catholic Church only relaxed its opposition to cremation in 1963. Although mass ossuaries have also been used, burial has always been the preferred Christian tradition, at least until recent times. Burial was, for as long as there was room, usually in a graveyard adjacent to the church, with a gravestone or horizontal slab, or for the wealthy or important clergy, inside it. Wall tombs in churches strictly include the body itself, often in a sarcophagus, while often the body is buried in a crypt or under the church floor, with a monument on the wall. Persons of importance, especially monarchs, might be buried in a free-standing sarcophagus, perhaps surrounded by an elaborate enclosure using metalwork and sculpture; grandest of all were the shrines of saints, which became the destinations of pilgrimages. The monument to Maximilian I, Holy Roman Emperor in the Hofkirche, Innsbruck took decades to complete, while the tomb of St Dominic in Bologna took several centuries to reach its final form.

If only because its strong prejudice against free-standing and life-size sculpture, Eastern Orthodoxy could not have developed the tomb monument in the same way as the Western Church, and the burials of rich or important individuals continued the classical tradition of sarcophagi carved in relief, with the richness of the carving tending to diminish over the centuries, until just simple religious symbols were left. Constantine I and most later Byzantine Emperors up to 1028 were buried in the Church of the Holy Apostles in Constantinople, which was destroyed after the fall of Constantinople of 1453. Some massive but mostly plain porphyry sarcophagi from the church are now placed outside the Istanbul Archaeology Museums.

The Tomb of Antipope John XXIII in Florence is a grand Early Renaissance wall tomb by Donatello and Michelozzo; although classical in style, it reflects the somewhat inharmonious stacking up of different elements typical of major Gothic tombs. It has a life-size effigy, also known as a gisant, lying on the sarcophagus, which was common from the Romanesque period through to the Baroque and beyond. Ruling dynasties were often buried together, usually in monasteries; the Chartreuse de Champmol was founded for that purpose by the Valois Dukes of Burgundy in 1383. The Scaliger tombs in Verona are magnificent free-standing Gothic canopied tombs—they are outside the church in a special enclosure, and so are unrestricted in height. Important churches like St Peter's in Rome, St Paul's Cathedral, London, Santi Giovanni e Paolo, Venice (twenty-five Doges), and the Basilica of Santa Croce, Florence contain large numbers of impressive monuments to the great and the good, created by the finest architects and sculptors available. Local parish churches are also often full of monuments, which may include large and artistically significant ones for local landowners and notables. Often a prominent family would add a special chapel for their use, including their tombs; in Catholic countries, bequests would pay for masses to be said in perpetuity for their souls. By the High Renaissance, led by Michelangelo's tombs, the effigies are often sitting up, and later may stand. Often they turn towards the altar, or are kneeling facing it in profile.

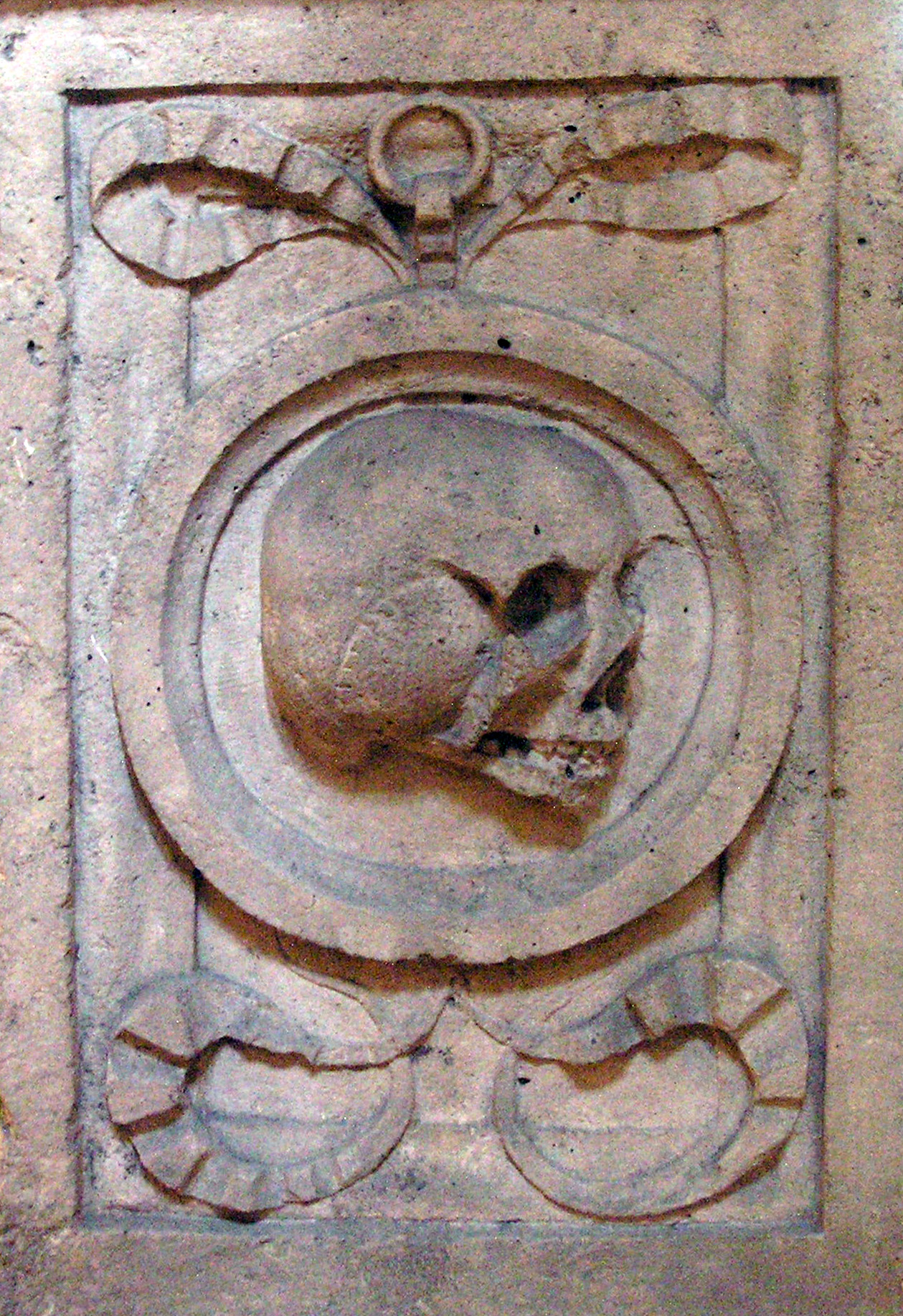
"The Mirror of Death": Detail from a French Renaissance monument of 1547

In the late Middle Ages, influenced by the Black Death and devotional writers, explicit memento mori imagery of death in the forms of skulls or skeletons, or even decomposing corpses overrun with worms in the transi tomb, became common in northern Europe, as well as motifs like the Dance of Death and works like the Ars moriendi or "Art of Dying". It took until the Baroque period for such imagery to become popular in Italy, in works like the tomb of Pope Urban VIII by Bernini (1628–1647), where a bronze winged skeleton inscribes the Pope's name on a tablet below his enthroned effigy. As cities became more crowded, bones were sometimes recovered after a period, and placed in ossuaries where they might be arranged for artistic effect, as at the Capuchin Crypt in Rome or the Czech Sedlec Ossuary, which has a chandelier made of skulls and bones.

The church struggled to eliminate the pagan habits of leaving grave goods except for the clothing and usual jewellery of the powerful, especially rings. Kings might be buried with a sceptre, and bishops with a crozier, their respective symbols of office. The 7th-century Stonyhurst Gospel, with a unique Insular original leather binding, was recovered from St Cuthbert's coffin, itself a significant object. The armour and sword of a knight might be hung over his tomb, as those of the Black Prince still are in Canterbury Cathedral. The Early Christian Church, to the frustration of historians of costume, encouraged burial in a plain white winding-sheet, as being all that would be required at the Second Coming. For centuries, most except royalty followed this custom, which at least kept clothing, which was very expensive for rich and poor alike, available for the use of the living. The use of a rich cloth pall to cover the coffin during the funeral grew during the Middle Ages; initially these were brightly coloured and patterned, only later black. They were usually then given to the Church to use for vestments or other decorations.

From the early 13th century to the 16th, a popular form of monument north of the Alps, especially for the smaller landowner and merchant classes, was the monumental brass, a sheet of brass on which the image of the person or persons commemorated was engraved, often with inscriptions and an architectural surround. They could be on the floor or wall inside a church. These provide valuable evidence as to changes in costume, especially for women. Many bishops and even some German rulers were commemorated with brasses.

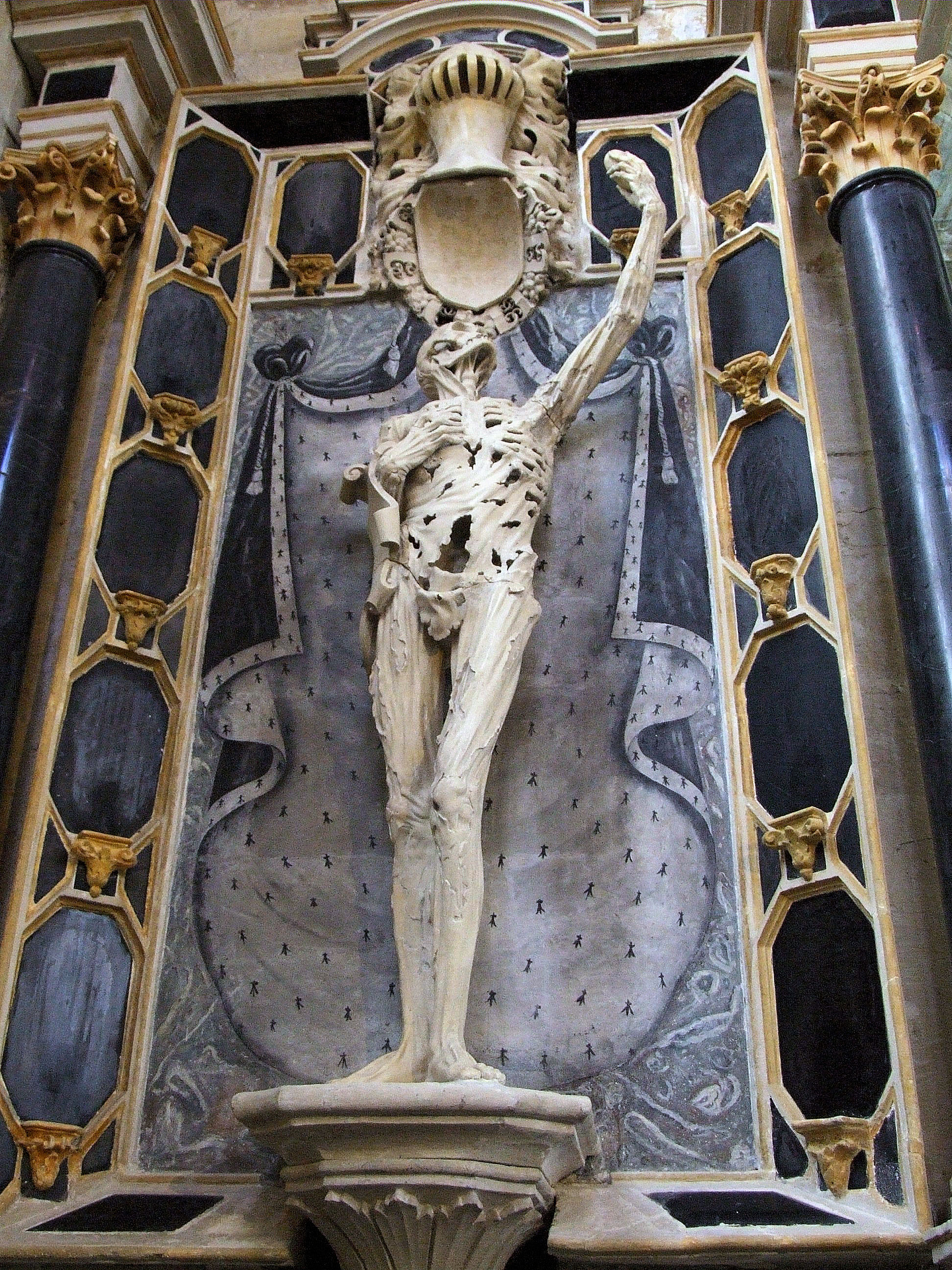
Ligier Richier, Cadaver Tomb of René of Chalon, c. 1545–47

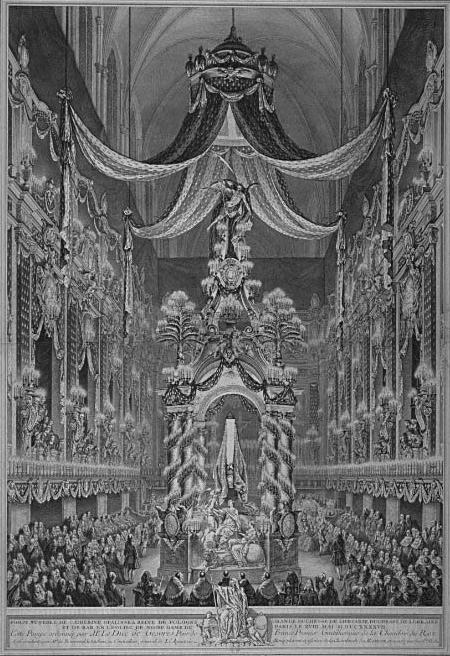
Castrum doloris for Queen Katarzyna Opalińska of Poland, erected in Notre Dame de Paris in 1747

The castrum doloris was a temporary catafalque erected around the coffin for the lying in state of important people, usually in a church, the funerary version of the elaborate temporary decorations for other court festivities, like royal entries. These began in the late Middle Ages, but reached their height of elaboration in the 18th century. A particular feature in Poland was the coffin portrait, a bust-length painted portrait of the deceased, attached to the coffin, but removed before burial and often then hung in the church. Elsewhere, death masks were used in similar fashion. Hatchments were a special lozenge-shaped painted coat of arms which was displayed on the house of the deceased for a mourning period, before usually being moved to hang in the church. Like mourning clothes, these fall outside a strict definition of art.

For some time after the Protestant Reformation, English church monuments formed the majority of large-scale artworks added to Protestant churches, especially in sculpture. The English upper classes ceased to commission altarpieces and other religious art for churches, but their tomb monuments continued to grow in size to fill the empty wall spaces; similar trends were seen in Lutheran countries, but Calvinists tended to be more disapproving of figure sculpture. Many portraits were painted after death, and sometimes dead family members were included along with the living; a variety of indications might be used to suggest the distinction.

The large Baroque tomb monument continued likely to include a portrait of the deceased, and was more likely to include personified figures of Death, Time, Virtues or other figures than angels. The late medieval transi tomb vocabulary of images of bodily decay, such as skulls and skeletons, was sometimes re-introduced, but in a less confrontational manner. Neo-Classicism, led by Antonio Canova, revived the classical stela, either with a portrait or a personification; in this style there was little or no difference between the demands of Catholic and Protestant patrons.

By the 19th century, many Old World churchyards and church walls had completely run out of room for new monuments, and cemeteries on the outskirts of cities, towns or villages became the usual place for burials. The rich developed the classical styles of the ancient world for small family tombs, while the rest continued to use gravestones or what were now usually false sarcophagi, placed over a buried coffin. The cemeteries of the large Italian cities are generally accepted to have outdone those of other nations in terms of extravagant statuary, especially the Monumental Cemetery of Staglieno in Genoa, the Cimitero Monumentale di Milano and the Certosa di Bologna. In Italy at least, funerary sculpture remained of equal status to other types during the 19th and early 20th centuries, and was made by the leading artists, often receiving reviews in the press, and being exhibited, perhaps in maquette form.

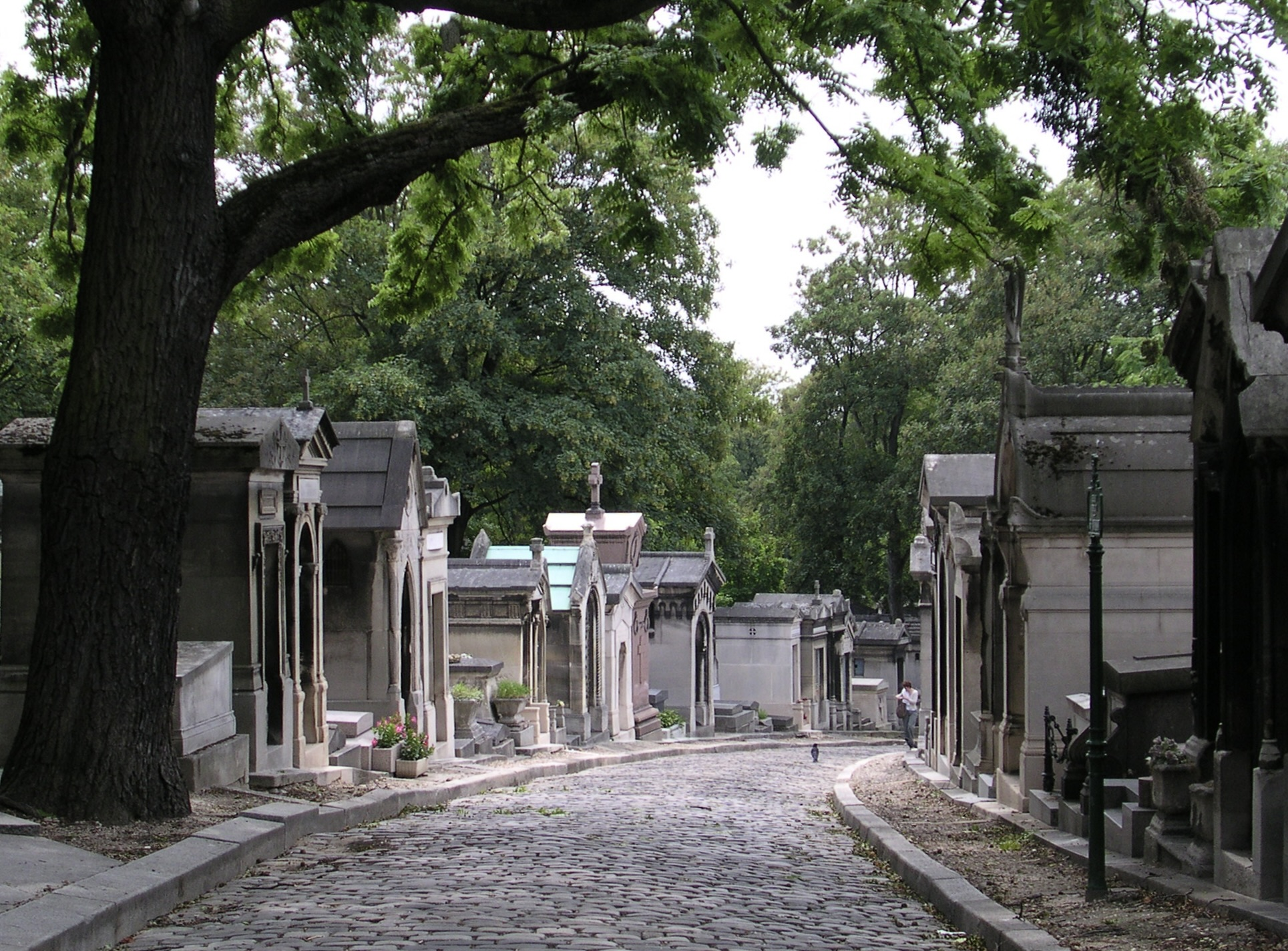
19th-century bourgeois family tombs at Père Lachaise Cemetery in Paris

Monuments kept up with contemporary stylistic developments during the 19th century, embracing Symbolism enthusiastically, but then gradually became detached from the avant-garde after Art Nouveau and a few Art Deco examples. Where burials in church crypts or floors took place, memorial stained glass windows, mostly on normal religious subjects but with a commemorative panel, are often found. War memorials, other than on the site of a battle, were relatively unusual until the 19th century, but became increasingly common during it, and after World War I were erected even in villages of the main combatant nations.

=== Islam ===
Islamic funerary art is dominated by architecture. Grave goods are discouraged to the point that their absence is frequently one recognition criterion of Muslim burials. Royalty and important religious figures were typically buried in plain stone sarcophagi, perhaps with a religious inscription. However, funerary architecture often offered a means of "moving beyond the strictures of formal Muslim burial rites" and expressing social dimensions such as status, piety, love for the deceased, and Muslim identity.

A number of distinct architectural traditions arose for expressing these social elements. The Islamic tradition was slow in starting; the hadith "condemn the building of tombs, and Muhammad himself set the example of requesting burial in an unmarked grave in one of the chambers of his house" in Medina, though by at least the 12th century, buildings of the vast Al-Masjid an-Nabawi complex already marked the site. The earliest identified Muslim monumental tomb, in Samarra in Iraq, only dates from 862, and was commissioned by the Byzantine princess whose son was buried there. At some point, the tradition incorporated the idea of a garden setting, perhaps following the Islamic concept of Paradise, an association certainly made when the tradition was mature, although the difficulty of reconstructing gardens from archaeology makes the early stages of this process hard to trace. At any rate, gardens surrounding tombs became established in Islamic tradition in many parts of the world, and existing pleasure gardens were sometimes appropriated for this purpose. Versions of the formal Persian charbagh design were widely used in India, Persia and elsewhere.

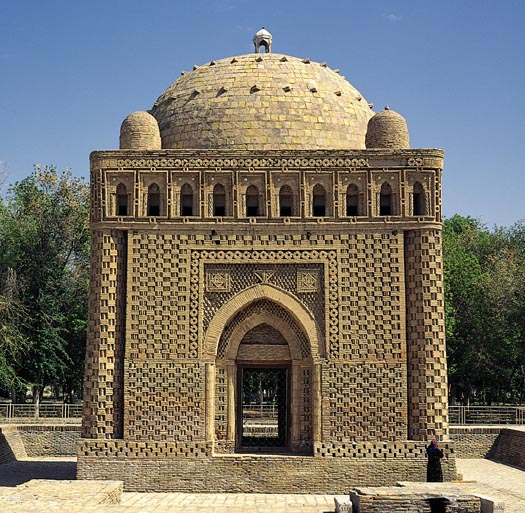
Brick Samanid Mausoleum, c. 910, Bokhara

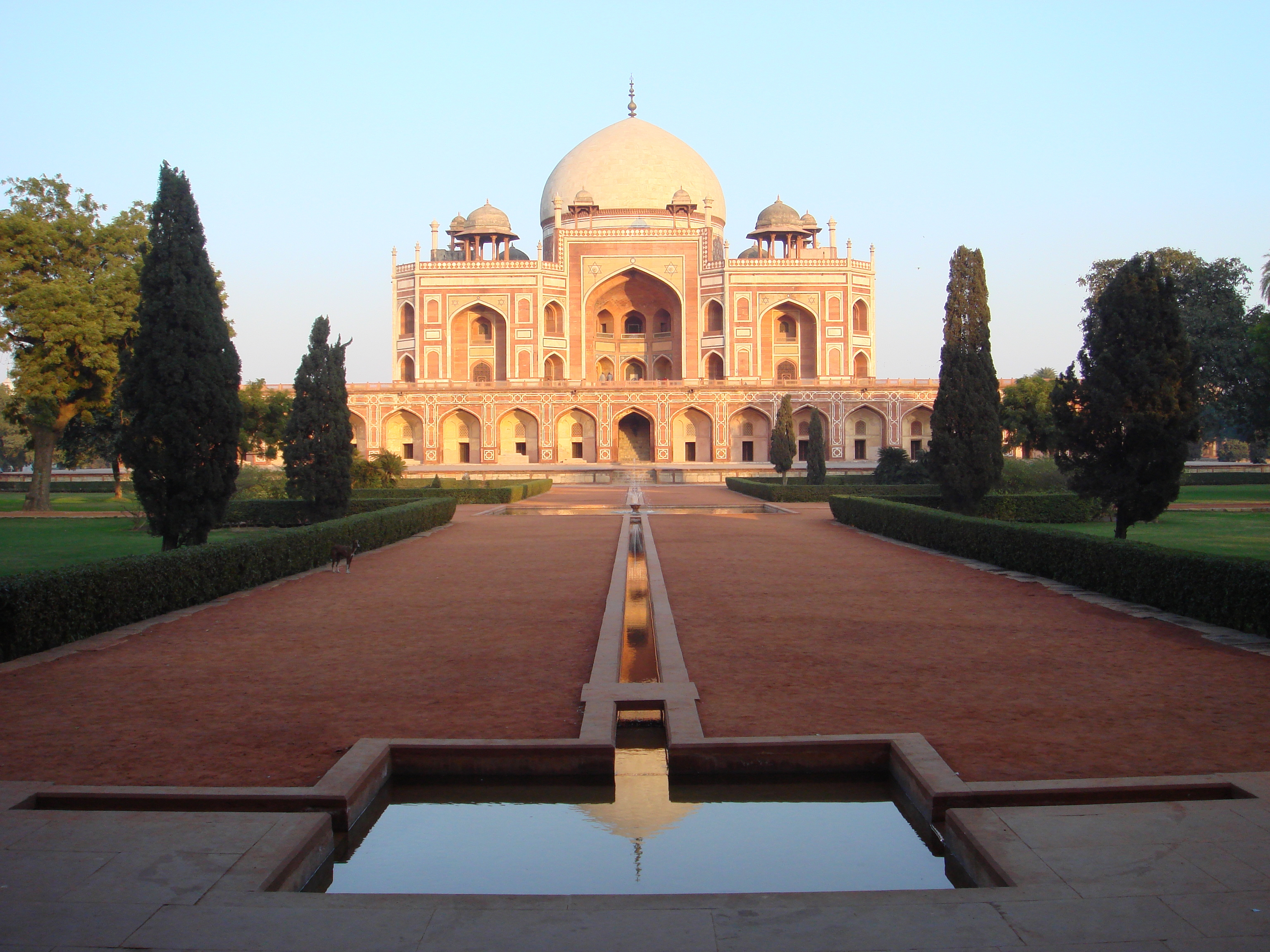
Humayun's Tomb (1560s), Delhi, in its garden setting

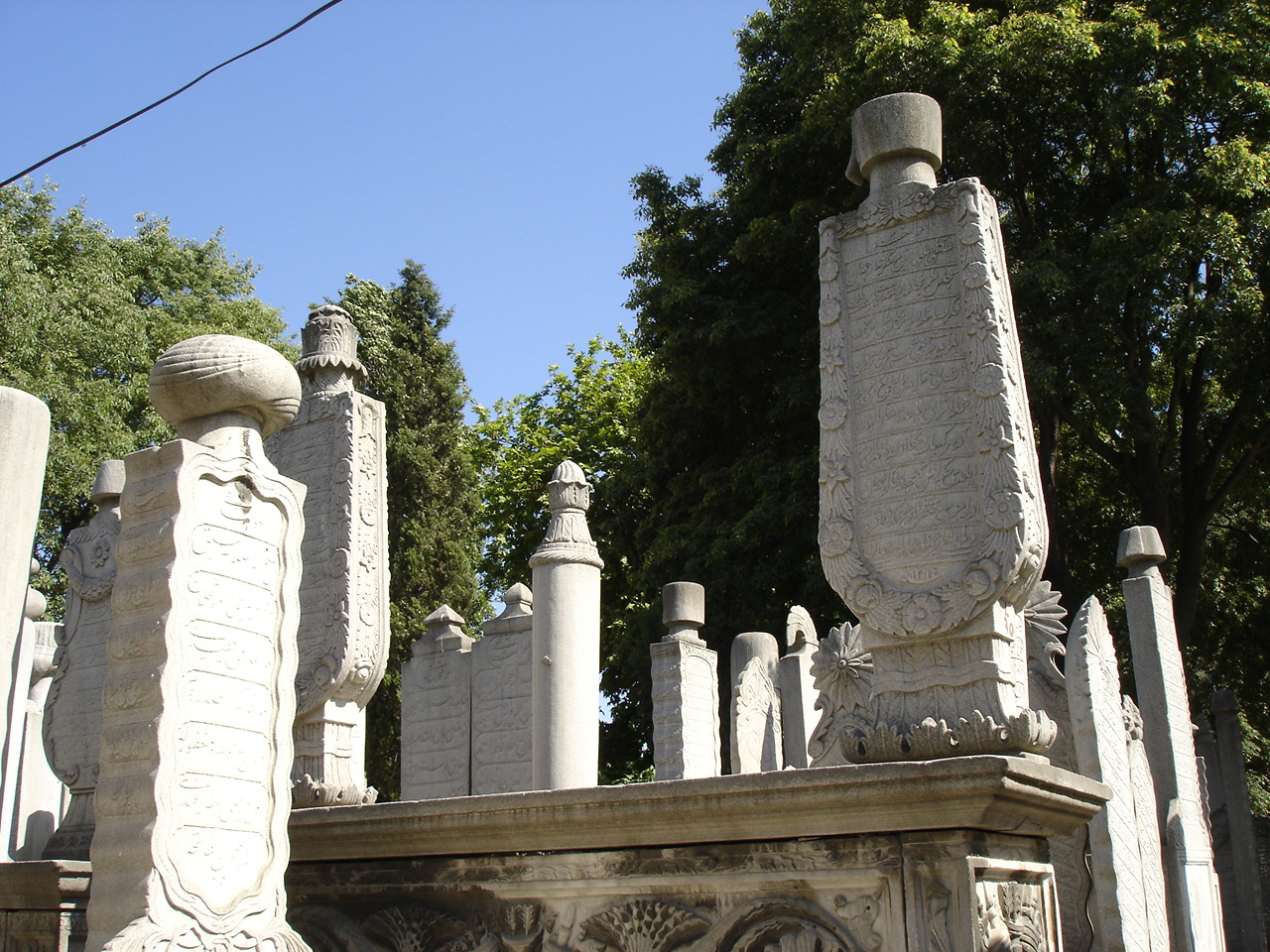
Turkish gravestones, capped by a turban, in Istanbul

Another influence may have been the octagonal Dome of the Rock in Jerusalem, not a mausoleum itself, but "the earliest Islamic model for centrally planned commemorative buildings", adapting the Byzantine form of the martyrium in a building standing alone, though on a stone platform rather than in a garden. In the Persian sphere, a tradition of relatively small mausoleums evolved, often in the shape of short hexagonal or octagonal domed towers, usually containing a single chamber, like the Malek Tomb. These single-chambered tombs developed into larger buildings in the Timurid and Mughal Empires, like the Gur-e Amir tomb of Timur at Samarkand and the famous Mughal tombs of India, which culminated in the Taj Mahal. The Mughal tombs are mostly set in a large walled charbagh (chahar-bagh) or Mughal gardens, often with pavilions at the corners and a gatehouse. The Taj Mahal is atypically placed at the end of the garden, backing onto the river Yamuna; a central placing is usual. They may have minarets, although they do not normally function as mosques. The Tomb of Jahangir lacks any dome, while the Tomb of Akbar the Great has only small decorative ones. Other Islamic Indian rulers built similar tombs, such as Gol Gumbaz.

In all this tradition, the contemporary architectural style for mosques was adapted for a building with a smaller main room, and usually no courtyard. Decoration was often tilework, and could include parchin kari inlays in semi-precious stone, painting, and decorative carving. No animals would be represented, but geometric patterns and written inscriptions were common. The sarcophagus might be in a small inner chamber, dimly visible through a grille of metal or stone, or might stand in the main room. Money would be bequeathed to pay for continuous readings of the Qur'an in the mausoleum, and they were normally open for visitors to pay their respects. The Mausoleum of Khomeini, still under construction in a Tehran cemetery, and intended to be the centre of a huge complex, continues these traditions.

The tradition evolved differently in the Ottoman world, where smaller single-roomed türbe typically stand on the grounds of mosque complexes, often built by the deceased. The sarcophagi (often purely symbolic, as the body is below the floor) may be draped in a rich pall, and surmounted by a real cloth or stone turban, which is also traditional at the top of ordinary Turkish gravestones (usually in stylised form). Two of the most famous are in the Süleymaniye Mosque in Istanbul; the Yeşil Türbe ("Green Tomb") of 1421 is an unusually large example in Bursa, and also unusual in having extensive tile work on the exterior, which is usually masonry, whereas the interiors are often decorated with brightly colored tiles.

Other parts of the Islamic world reflected local techniques and traditions. The 15th-century royal Tomb of Askia in Mali used the local technique of mud-building to erect a 17-metre-high (56 ft) pyramidal tomb set in a mosque complex. At the other end of the Islamic world, Javanese royalty are mostly buried in royal graveyards such as those at Kota GedMe and Imogiri. Mausoleums of rulers are more likely to be a side-room inside a mosque or form part of a larger complex containing perhaps a hospital, madrasah or library. Large domes, elaborately decorated inside, are common. The tomb-mosque of Sultan Qaitbay (died 1496) is a famous example, one of many in Cairo, though here the tomb chamber is unusually large compared to the whole.

== Contemporary period ==
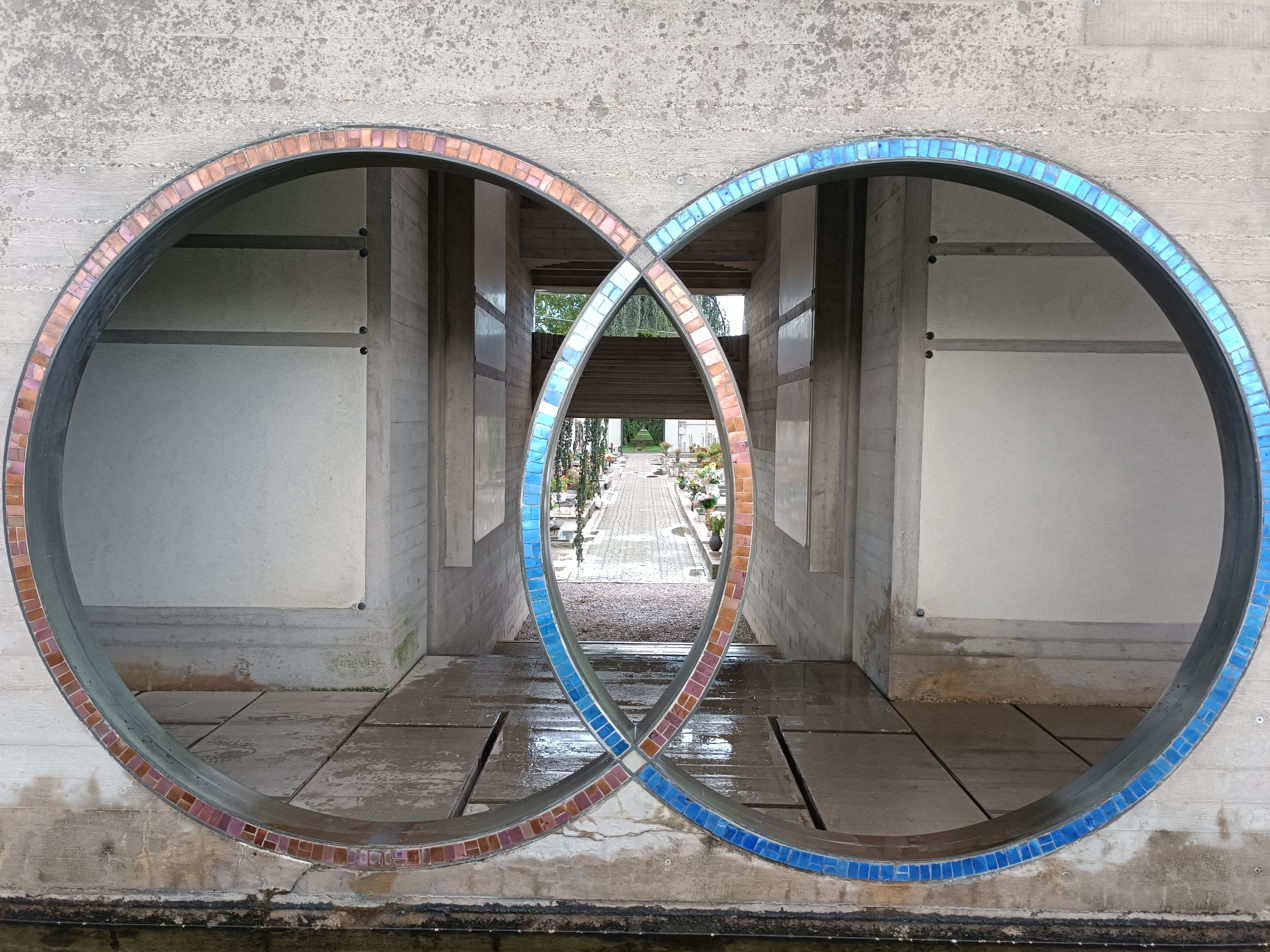
Brion tomb designed by Carlo Scarpa, 1968–1978

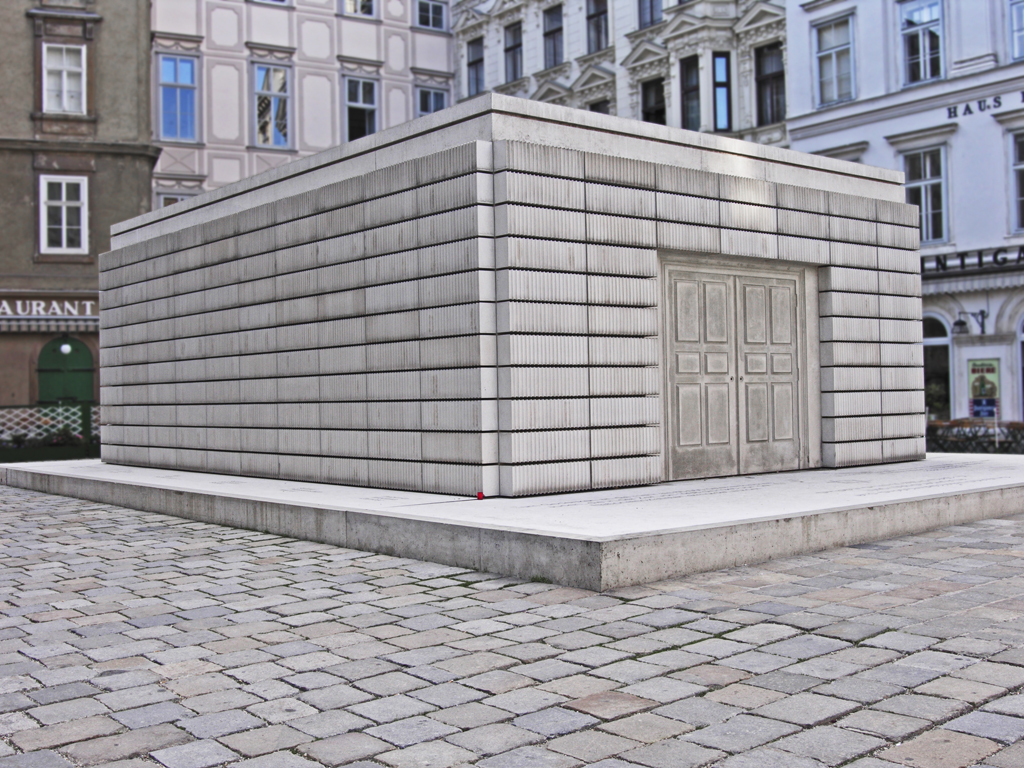
The Judenplatz Holocaust Memorial to the 65,000 Austrian Jews killed in the Holocaust, designed by Rachel Whiteread and completed in 2000

Funerary art tends to be conservative in style, and many grave markers in various cultures follow rather traditional patterns, while others reflect modernism or other recent styles. Public monuments representing collective memorials to particular groups of dead people continue to be erected, especially war memorials, and in the Western world have now replaced individual or family memorials as the dominant types of very large memorials; Western political leaders now usually receive simple graves. Some large memorials are fairly traditional, while those reflecting more contemporary styles include the Vietnam Veterans Memorial, and several Holocaust memorials, such as Yad Vashem in Jerusalem, the Vel d'Hiv Memorial in Paris (1994), the Memorial to the Murdered Jews of Europe in Berlin (2004), and the Judenplatz Holocaust Memorial in Vienna (2000). These are in notable contrast to the style of most war memorials to the military of World War II; earlier modernist memorials to the dead of World War I were sometimes removed after a time as inappropriate. Some war memorials, especially in countries like Germany, have had a turbulent political history, for example the much-rededicated Neue Wache in Berlin and the Yasukuni Shrine in Tokyo, which is internationally controversial.

Several critics detect a crisis in public memorial style from 1945, when the traditional figurative symbolic language, and evocation of nationalist values, came to seem inadequate, especially in relation to genocide, at least on the Western side of the Iron Curtain. In the Communist East the established style of Socialist Realism was still considered appropriate, at least by the authorities. The generation of abstracted and conceptual war and Holocaust memorials erected in the West from the 1990s onwards seems finally to have found a resolution for these issues.

Many large mausoleums have been constructed for political leaders, including Lenin's Mausoleum and those for Atatürk, Jinnah, Kim Il-Sung, Che Guevara and several presidential memorials in the United States, although the actual burials of recent presidents are very simple, with their presidential library and museum now usually their largest commemorative memorial. The Mausoleum of Khomeini is a grand mosque complex, as large as any medieval example, not least because it includes a 20,000 place parking lot.

== See also ==
- List of mausolea
- List of types of funerary monument
- Mourning portraits
- Tomb effigies
