= Funeral Crown =

Part of Polish crown jewels

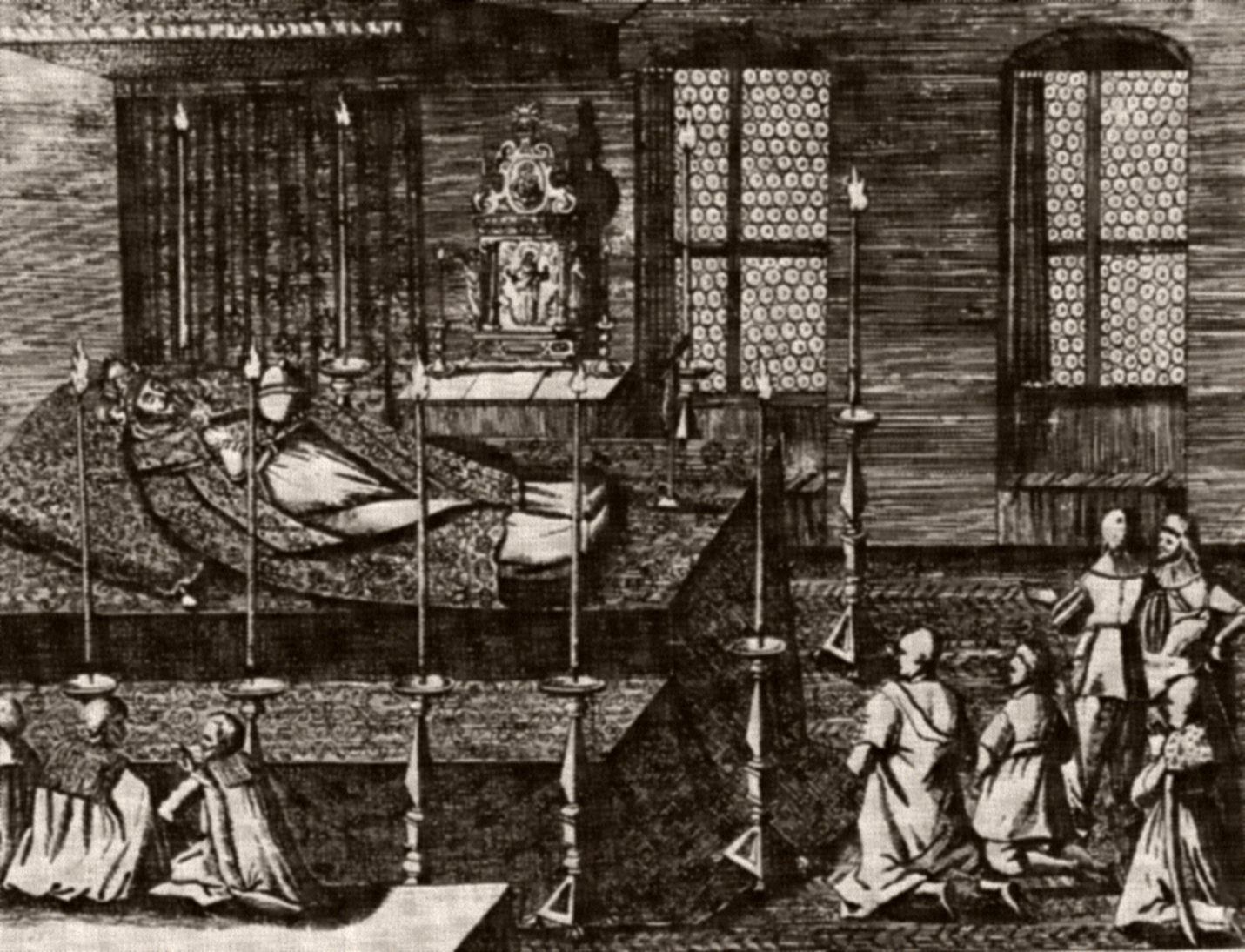
King Sigismund III on catafalque displayed in the Guard Chamber at the Royal Castle, Warsaw, 1632

The Funeral Crown (Polish: Korona Pogrzebowa), also known under its Latin name as the Corona Funebris or Funebralis, was a part of the Polish Crown Jewels. It was probably lost before 1669.

== History ==
The crown was executed around 1586 for funeral ceremonies to Stephen Báthory of Poland and was bequeathed to the State Treasury of the Polish–Lithuanian Commonwealth at the end of the 16th century. It was described in an inventory from the early seventeenth century as silver gilded funeral crown with an orb and sceptrum and an inscription of King Stephen. The crown was intended for funeral ceremonies of the Polish monarchs and was placed on the corpse of the deceased, lying in the Castrum doloris. When the last of the Jagiellons, Sigismund II Augustus, died in Knyszyn and transport of the Crown Jewels from the treasury in Kraków to Podlaskie was impossible, the Hungarian Crown was used as an exequial crown instead.
