= Castrum doloris =

Decorative material for funerals

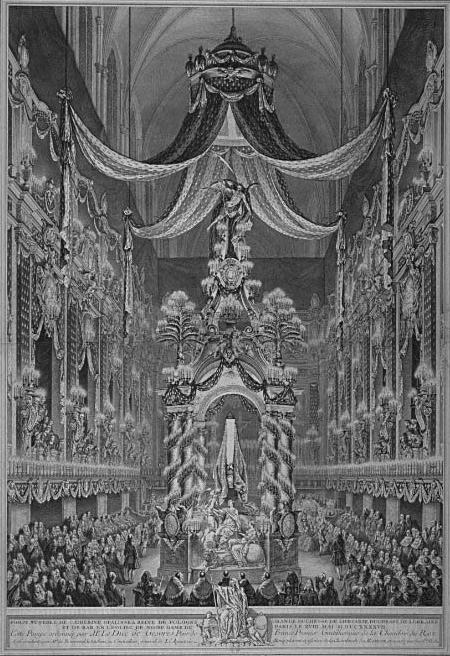
Castrum doloris of Queen Catherine Opalińska

A castrum doloris (Latin for castle of grief) was a structure and set of decorations which sheltered and accompanied the catafalque or bier in a funeral. It signified the prestige and power of the deceased, and was common in Poland-Lithuania and other parts of Europe.

Initially a simple wooden structure with a fabric baldachin, it gradually transformed in the 17th century and 18th century to a more elaborate form. Sometimes it would be supplemented by candles, coats of arms, epitaphs and allegorical pictures, in which case it was also called a chapelle ardente. Sigismund II Augustus was one of the first Polish rulers to have a castrum doloris in the 1570s.

== See also ==
- Funeral crown
- Coffin portraits: Notable examples includes (Polish: portret trumienny) from the Polish–Lithuanian Commonwealth.
