= List of royal crowns =

The following is a list of royal crowns:

Image	Country	Name of crown	Year crafted	Fate
	Albania	Helmet of Skanderbeg	—N/a	Modern day replica crafted
	Austria (Duchy)	Ducal hat of Styria	Unknown	Kept at Universalmuseum Joanneum in Styria
	Austria (Empire)	Imperial Crown of Austria	1602	Kept at the Imperial Treasury, Vienna
	Austria (Archduchy)	Archducal hat of Tyrol	1602	Kept at a treasury in Mariastein, Tyrol
	Austria (Archduchy)	Archducal hat of Austria	1616	Kept at Klosterneuburg Abbey in Lower Austria.
	Austria (Archduchy)	Archducal hat of Joseph II	1764	Kept at the Imperial Treasury, Vienna
	Bhutan	Raven Crown	c.1850?	First prototype is extant
	Bohemia (Czech Republic)	Crown of Saint Wenceslas	1347	Kept in Prague Castle
	Bulgaria	Heraldic Crown of Bulgaria	—N/a	Modern day replica crafted
	Cambodia	Royal Crown of Cambodia	—N/a	Lost in 1970
	Croatia	Crown of Zvonimir		
	Denmark	Crown of Christian V		Kept in Rosenborg Castle
	Denmark	Crown of Christian IV		Kept in Rosenborg Castle
	Egypt	Heraldic Crown of Egypt		
	Finland	Crown of Finland		Modern day replica crafted
	France	Crown of Charlemagne		Destroyed in 1793
	France	Crown of tradition of the Queens		Destroyed in 1590
	France	Crown of Saint Louis		Destroyed in 1793
	France	Crown of the Queens of Jeanne d'Évreux		Destroyed in 1793
	France	Funeral crown of Queen Anne of Austria		Destroyed in 1793
	France	Gold crown of Louis XIV		Destroyed in 1793
	France	Vermeil crown of Louis XIV		Destroyed in 1793
	France	Funeral crown of Queen Marie Therese of Austria		Destroyed in 1793
	France	Funeral crown of Henriette of France, Queen of England		Destroyed in 1793
	France	Funeral crown of Philippe Duke of Orleans		Destroyed in 1793
	France	Crown of the Dauphine		Destroyed in 1793
	France	Gold crown of Louis XV		Destroyed in 1793
	France	Crown of Louis XV		Kept in the Louvre
	France	Gold crown of Louis XVI		Destroyed in 1793
	France	Vermeil crown of Louis XVI		Destroyed in 1793
	France	Crown of Louis XII		Destroyed
	France	Gold crown of Henry IV		Destroyed in 1793
	France	Vermeil crown of Henry IV		Destroyed in 1793
	France	Gold crown of Louis XIII		Destroyed in 1793
	France	Vermeil crown of Louis XIII		Destroyed in 1793
	France	Crown of Charles X		Kept in the Basilica of St Denis
	France	Crown of Queen Marie Thérèse of Savoy		Kept in the Basilica of St Denis
	France	Crown of the Dauphin Louis Antoine Duke of Angoulême		
	Georgia	Crown of Imereti		
	Georgia	Crown of Heraclius II		Lost in late 18th century.
	Georgia	Crown of George XII		Missing in late 1930s. Painting kept in the Kremlin Museum
	Germany	Crown of Baden		
	Germany	Crown of Hanover		
	Germany	Royal Crown of Bavaria		Kept in the Munich Residenz
	Germany	Crown of Saxony		
	Germany	Crown of Württemberg		Kept in the Landesmuseum Württemberg
	Germany (Prussia)	Crown of Frederick I		Kept in Charlottenburg Palace
	Germany (Prussia)	Hohenzollern Crown		Kept in Hohenzollern Castle
	Greece	Crown of Greece		
	Hungary	Holy Crown of Hungary		Kept in the Hungarian Parliament Building
	Iran	Crown of Agha Mohammad Khan Qajar		Used by Agha Mohammad Khan Qajar. Kept at Golestan Palace.
	Iran	Kiani Crown		Used between 1796–1925 by the Qajar dynasty. Kept in the Treasury of National Jewels.
	Iran	Pahlavi Crown		Used between 1926–1979 by the Pahlavi dynasty. Kept in the Treasury of National Jewels.
	Iran	Empress's Crown		Used by the Shahbanu of Iran, Farah Pahlavi. Kept in the Treasury of National Jewels.
	Iraq	Heraldic crown of Iraq		
	Italy	Iron Crown of Lombardy		Kept in the Cathedral of Monza
	Italy	Crown of Italy		Used between 1870–1946, also known as the Savoy Crown.
	India	Crown of Bahadur Shah II		The crown of Bahadur Shah Zafar, the 20th emperor of the Mughal Empire. Part of the Royal Collection.
	India	Imperial Crown of India		Created for George V's 1911 Delhi Durbar. Kept in the Tower of London.
	Japan	Crown of Ryukyu		Lost in 1945. Replica kept in the Naha City Museum of History.
	Jordan	Heraldic Crown of Jordan		
	South Korea	Crowns of Silla		Kept in the Gyeongju National Museum
	South Korea	Crowns of Baekje		Kept in the Gongju National Museum
	South Korea	Crowns of Gaya		Kept in the Ho-am Art Museum and the National Museum of Korea
	Sri Lanka	Crown of Rajasinghe II		Kept in the National Museum of Kandy, Sri Lanka
	Sri Lanka	Crown of Sri Vikrama Rajasinha		Kept in the Colombo National Museum, Sri Lanka
	Laos	Crown of Laos		Kept in the Royal Palace, Luang Prabang
	Libya	Heraldic crown of Libya		
	Luxembourg	Heraldic Crown of Luxembourg		Heraldic royal crown with eight half-arches. Five half-arches its two-dimensional representation
	Madagascar	Crown of Ranavalona I		
	Madagascar	Crown of Ranavalona III		
	Monaco	Heraldic Crown of Monaco		Heraldic royal crown with eight half-arches. Five half-arches its two-dimensional representation
	Montenegro	Crown of Montenegro		
	Morocco	Heraldic Crown of Morocco		
	Nepal	Shripech		
	Netherlands	Crown of the Netherlands		Kept privately and only displayed at inaugurations in Amsterdam's Nieuwe Kerk
	Norway	Crown of Norway		Kept in Nidaros Cathedral
	Poland	Crown of Bolesław I the Brave		Replica made in 2001–2003 after the original was stolen in 1794 by Prussian soldiers, used to crown Polish Kings. Kept in the Wawel Castle
	Poland	Homagial Crown		
	Poland	Hungarian Crown		
	Poland	Swedish Crown		
	Poland	Muscovy Crown		
	Poland	Funeral Crown		
	Poland	Queens Crown		
	Poland	Helmet crown of Casimir III the Great		
	Poland	Crown of Augustus II the Strong		Kept in the Dresden Armoury
	Poland	Crown of Augustus III of Poland		Kept in the National Museum in Warsaw
	Poland	Crown of Queen Maria Josepha		Kept in the National Museum in Warsaw
	Portugal	Crown of João VI		Kept in the Ajuda National Palace
	Portugal	Diadem of the Stars		Kept in the Ajuda National Palace
	Romania	Steel Crown of Romania		Kept in the National Museum of Romanian History
	Romania	Crown of Queen Elizabeth		Kept in the National Museum of Romanian History
	Romania	Crown of Queen Maria		Kept in the National Museum of Romanian History
	Russia (Moscovy)	Monomakh's Cap		Kept in the Kremlin Armoury, as part of the Diamond Fund
	Serbia / Yugoslavia	Karađorđević Crown		Kept in Serbia
	Serbia / Yugoslavia	Nemanjić Crown		Kept in the Imperial Treasury, Vienna
	South India	Cheramudi (Chera crown)		Kept in the Padmanabhaswamy Temple vaults (occasionally displayed)
	Spain	Spanish Royal Crown		Kept in the Royal Palace of Madrid
	Sweden	Crown of Eric XIV		Kept in Stockholm Palace
	Syria	Heraldic crown of Syria		
	Thailand/Siam	Great Crown of Victory		Kept in the Grand Palace, Bangkok, (one shown, is a replica at the Naval museum).
	Tonga	Crown of Tonga		
	Ukraine	Ruthenian Crown		
	Ukraine	Crown of Rus		Original believed lost. Replica kept at Zolochiv Castle
	Ukraine	Crown of Saint Vladimir		
	United Kingdom	St Edward's Crown		Kept in the Tower of London
	United Kingdom	Imperial State Crown		Kept in the Tower of London
	United Kingdom	Queen Victoria's Diamond Crown		Kept in the Tower of London
	United Kingdom	State Crown of George I		Kept in the Tower of London
	United Kingdom	Coronation Crown of George IV		Kept in the Tower of London
	United Kingdom	Tudor Crown		Dismantled in 1649. Replica of original crown kept at Hampton Court Palace
	United Kingdom	Crown of James I		Dismantled in 1649
	United Kingdom	State Crown of Charles II		Dismantled in the reign of Queen Anne.
	United Kingdom (Scotland)	Crown of Scotland		Seen here in the presence of Queen Elizabeth II at the Scottish Parliament. (Crown kept at Edinburgh Castle as part of the Honours of Scotland).
	United States (Hawaii)	Crowns of Hawaii		Kept in the Iolani Palace
	Vietnam	Crown of Po Klong M'hnai		Kept in the Ho Chi Minh City Museum of History

== Others ==
- Heraldic Crown of the Order of Malta (Heraldic royal crown with eight half-arches. Five half-arches its two-dimensional representation)
- Oba's crown (Ritually potent crown composed of steel wires, beadwork and other masonry. Of all of the members of the Yoruba chieftaincy system of West Africa, only kings are allowed to wear it).

== See also ==
- Crown Jewels
- Imperial crown
- List of monarchies
