= Krzysztof Józef Werner =

Polish-Swiss painter (1718–1778)

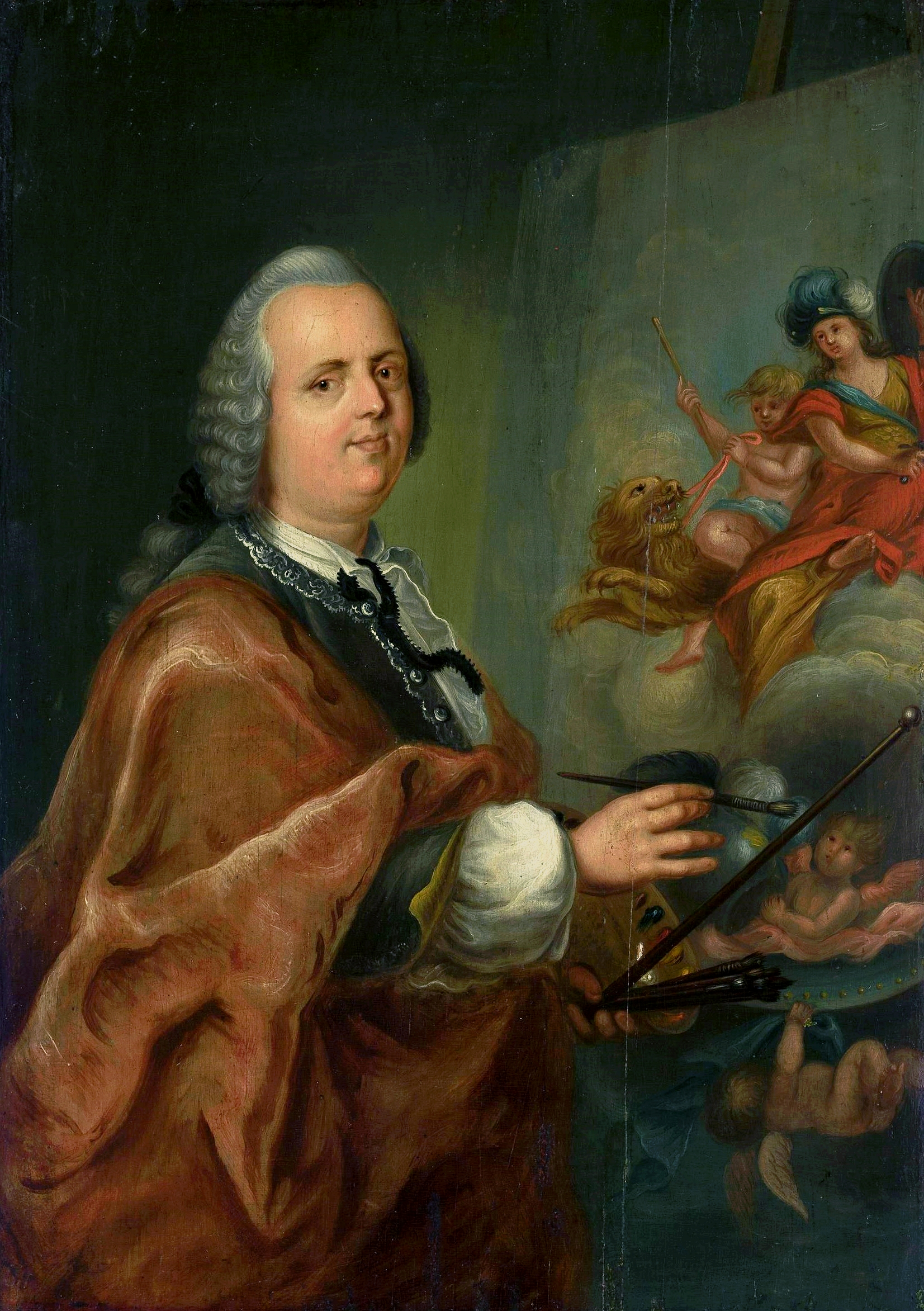
- Self-portrait, 1760s
- Born: 1718
- Died: 23 March 1778 (aged 59–60); Warsaw
- Known for: Portrait of Stanislaus Augustus Poniatowski in coronation robes
- Movement: Baroque

Krzysztof Józef Werner (1718–1778) was a Polish-Swiss painter. Who Worked On miniature portraits. He was employed first by King Augustus III.

== Biography ==
Krzysztof Józef Werner moved to Warsaw from Dresden in 1740 around this time he was employed by King Augustus III. However, after his death he was hired by the new polish king Stanisław August Poniatowski. He painted a coronation portrait of the new king. He was commissioned by the king to create many drawings and paintings of Royal Regalia. As a reward for his work He was made a noble by king Stanisław August Poniatowski.

== Use of Work ==
Krzysztof Józef Werner's work was used In the reconstruction of the Crown of Bolesław I the Brave in 2001-2003.
