= Polish crown jewels =

Regalia of Poland

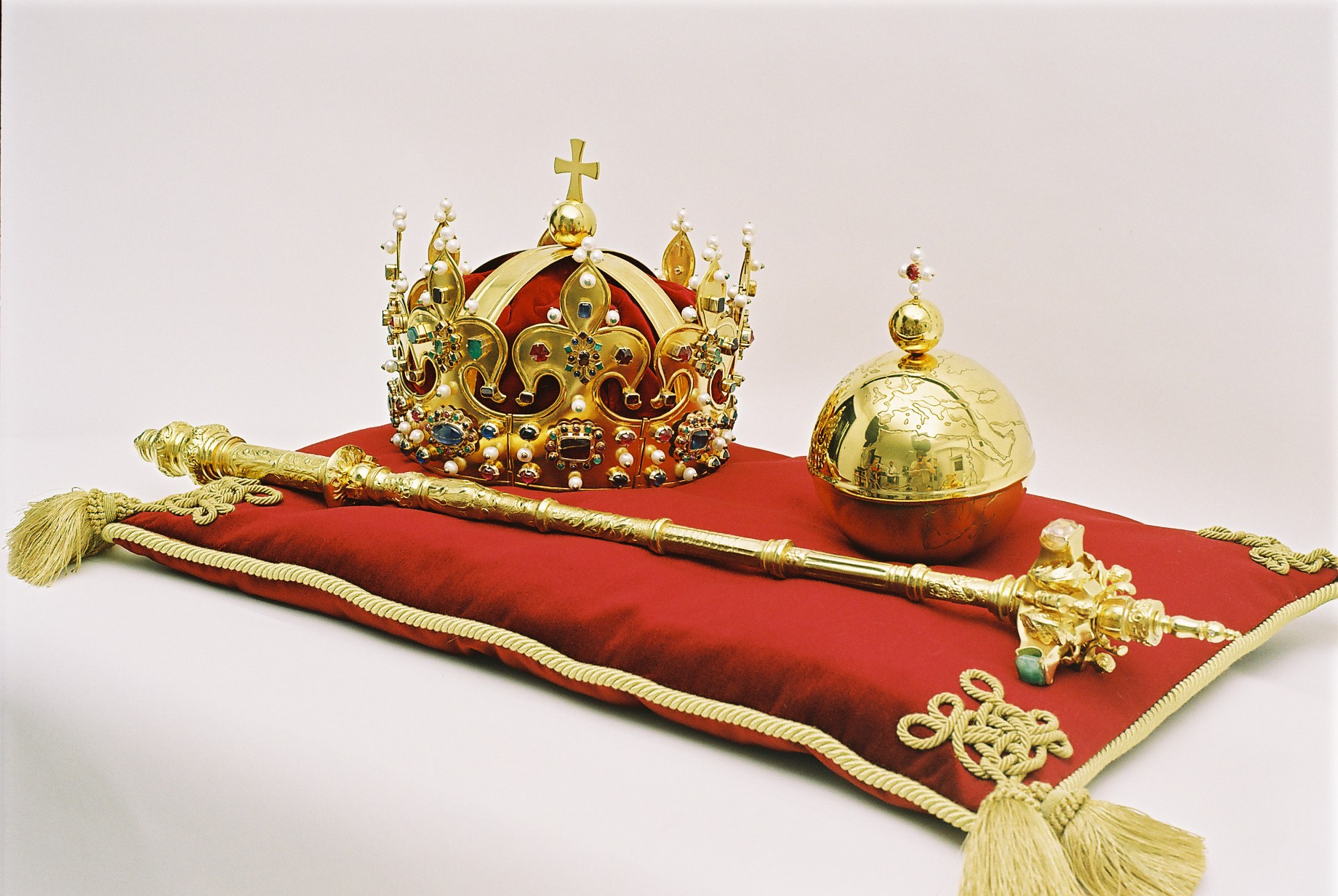
Replicas of the Crown of Bolesław I the Brave, the royal orb and sceptre used for the coronation of Stanisław II August in 1764

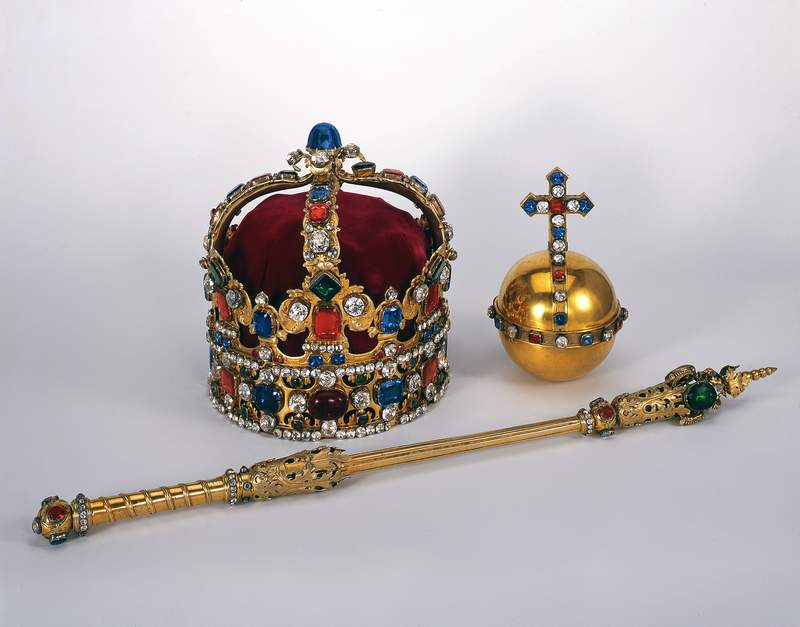
Regalia of King Augustus III

The only surviving original piece of the Polish crown jewels (Polish: Polskie klejnoty koronne) from the time of the Piast dynasty is the ceremonial sword Szczerbiec. It is currently on display along with other preserved royal items at the Wawel Royal Castle Museum in Kraków.

Several royal crowns were made, including several during the 16th century, a "Hungarian Crown", a "Swedish Crown" used by the Vasa kings, and others that were subsequently lost or destroyed. The crown regalia used by the Saxon kings, and some remainders of older Polish monarchs which were appropriated by king Augustus II, also the Elector of Saxony — like a cup of Queen Jadwiga so-called roztruchan, and the magnificent scale armour, so-called karacena, of King John III Sobieski — are today on display in the Grünes Gewölbe and the Rüstkammer in Dresden, Germany.

== History ==
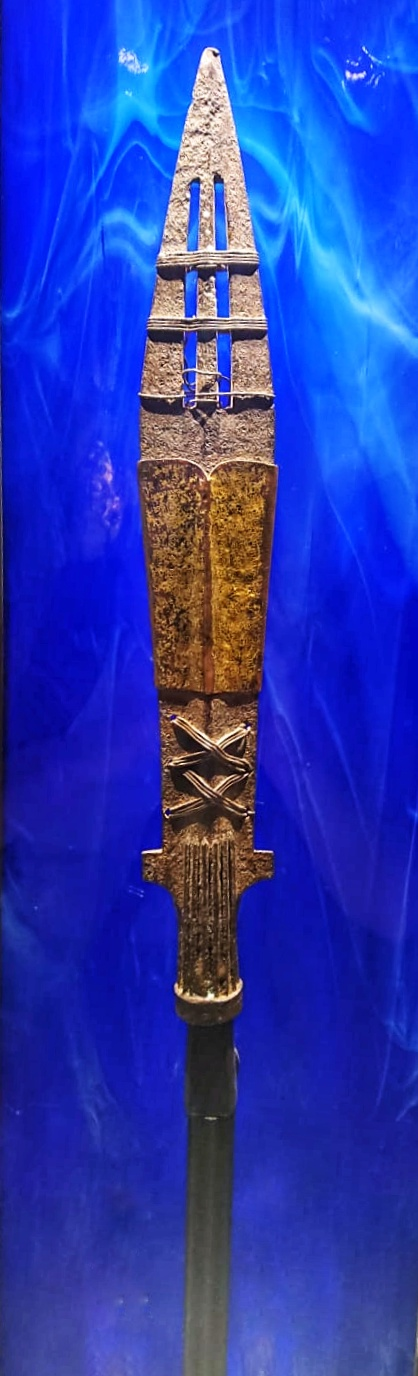
Polish replica of the Holy Lance, Wawel Cathedral Treasury

In AD 1000, during his pilgrimage to the tomb of Saint Adalbert in Gniezno, the capital of Poland until about 1040, Emperor Otto III officially recognized Duke Bolesław I the Brave as King of Poland (see Congress of Gniezno), crowning him and presenting him with a replica of the Holy Lance, also known as Saint Maurice's Spear. This relic, together with the vexillum attached to it, was probably the first insignia of the nascent Kingdom of Poland, a symbol of King Bolesław's rule, and of his allegiance to the Emperor. It remains unknown what images, if any, were painted or embroidered on the vexillum.

Starting from 1320 the regalia of the Polish kings were kept in the treasury of the Wawel Cathedral. In 1370 Louis I of Hungary decided to transfer the Polish regalia to Hungary and they were returned in 1412 to Andrzej of Rożnów embassy by Emperor Sigismund of Luxemburg. During the reign of the Jagiellons the regalia were moved from the cathedral to the Wawel Castle and placed in the specially prepared Crown Treasury. In the 17th century they were repeatedly brought to Warsaw for the coronations of the Polish Queens. During the Deluge in 1655, the royal insignia were evacuated from the castle by Jerzy Sebastian Lubomirski, Grand Marshal of the Crown and hidden in the old castle in Stará Ľubovňa. They were stored there until 1661. In 1703 during the Great Northern War they were hidden again, first in Silesia, then in Moravia. During the double election of 1733, the regalia were stolen by the follower of Stanisław I Leszczyński, Franciszek Maksymilian Ossoliński, Grand Treasurer of the Crown, who concealed them in the Holy Cross Church in Warsaw. In 1734, however, they were recovered from the hideout and deposited in the Jasna Góra Monastery, where they remained till 1736. In 1764, with the consent of the Sejm, the royal insignia were transported to Warsaw for the coronation of King Stanisław II August. Later returned to the Wawel Castle, where they were kept till the Third Partition of Poland in 1795.

On 15 June 1794 the Prussian Army entered Kraków and captured Wawel Castle, subsequently turning it into a fortress. Shortly thereafter, the city commandant, general Leopold von Reuts began a correspondence with Berlin on the fate of furnishings of the Polish kings' residence. In the greatest secrecy, by order of King Frederick William II of Prussia, he was commanded to transfer the content of the Crown Treasury to the Secret Councillor Anton Ludwig von Hoym, who was to secure its transport via Silesia to Berlin. The locksmith brought by the Prussians broke the locks of the treasury and then opened all the boxes. The valuables were transported in 1794 and found their place in the collection of the Hohenzollerns in Berlin.

In 1800 the valuables were stored in the Berlin Palace, where they were admired by Prince Augustus Frederick, Duke of Sussex, as he informed Julian Ursyn Niemcewicz. In 1809 the Polish regalia were valued at 525,259 thalers and shortly after, on 17 March 1809, in accordance with the decision of Frederick William III of Prussia, all of them were melted down. The obtained gold was reused to make coins, while precious stones and pearls were handed to the Directorate of Maritime Trade in Berlin.

== Components ==
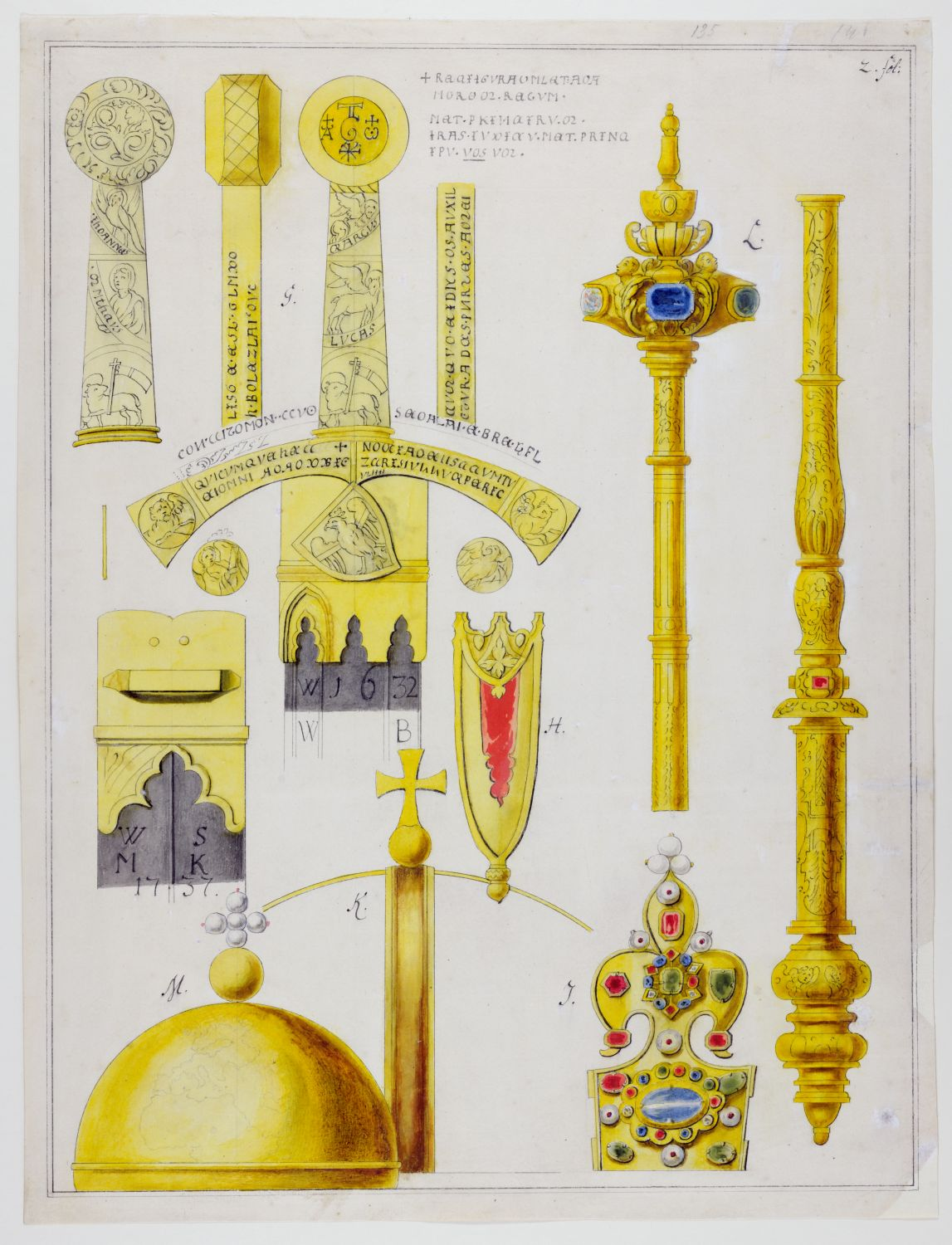
Detailed drawing by Krzysztof Józef Werner of parts of the regalia such as the sword Szczerbiec, Crown of Bolesław I the Brave, royal sceptre and orb (before 1794)

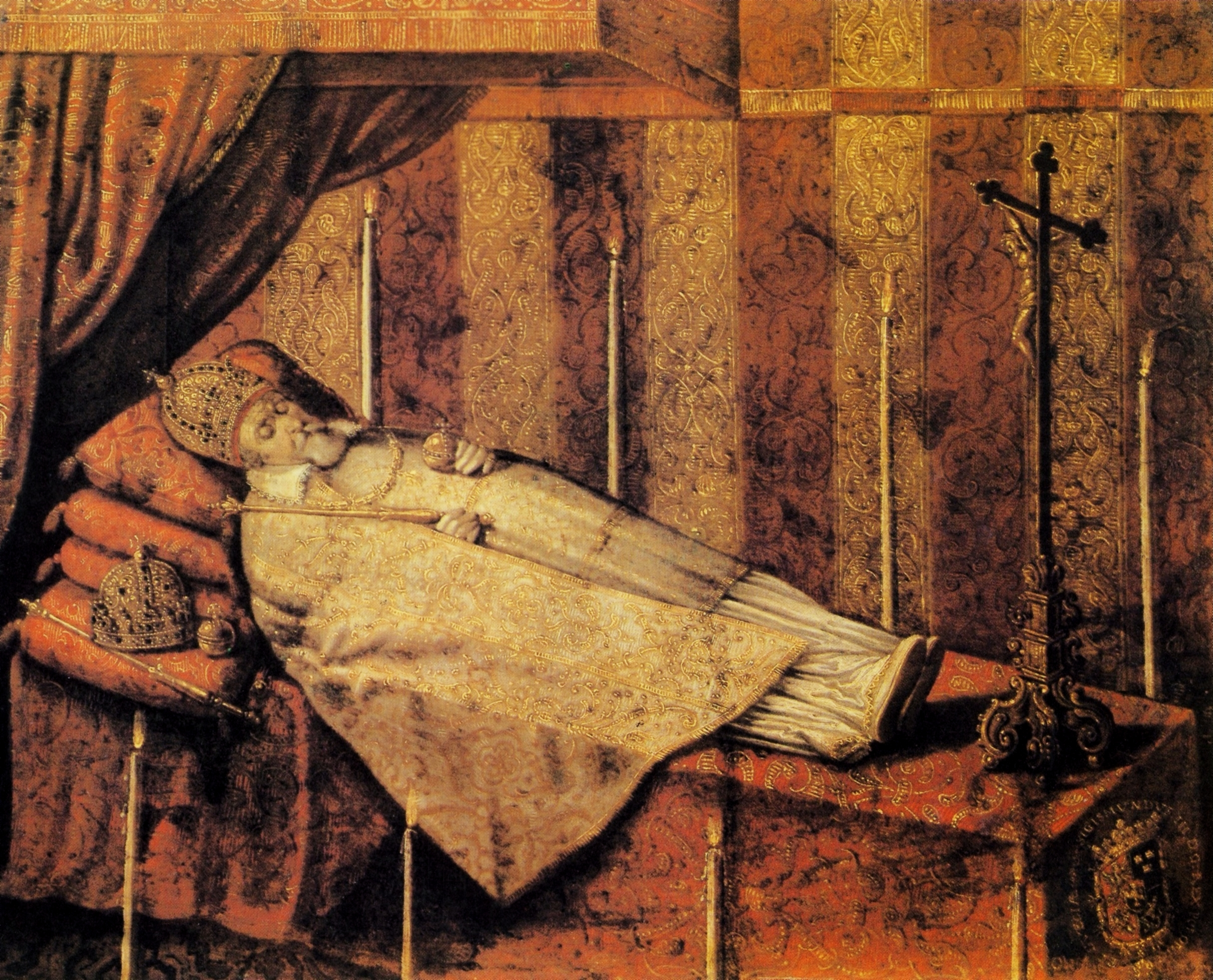
Sigismund III on catafalque displayed in the Guard Chamber at the Royal Castle in Warsaw. Painted by Christian Melich, ca. 1632. The King was depicted with the "Muscovy Crown" on his head and the "Swedish Crown" put on a pillow next to him.

According to an inventory of the State Treasury at the Wawel performed in 1633 by the Jerzy Ossoliński, Great Crown Chancellor the Crown Regalia of the Polish–Lithuanian Commonwealth (kept in five chests) consisted of:

- the Crown of Bolesław I the Brave, according to a legend handed over to the first Polish monarch by Emperor Otto III, made for Władysław I the Elbow-high
- the so-called "Queens Crown" made for Jadwiga of Kalisz
- the so-called "Hungarian Crown" made for John II Sigismund Zápolya according to Crown of Saint Stephen
- the so-called "Homagial Crown" for receiving homages, made for Władysław II Jagiełło
- the so-called "Funebralis Crown" intended for funeral ceremonies of the Polish monarchs, made for Stephen Báthory
- three sceptres and three silver orbs
- a silver chain with the relic of the holy cross (Crux cum ligno Vitae)
- the Ruthenian crosses and relics
- Latin Bible copied on parchment
- rhinoceros horn (Cornu Rynocerotis)
- Szczerbiec, the coronation sword that was used in crowning ceremonies of most kings of Poland
- Grunwald Swords, two Teutonic Order swords received at the Battle of Grunwald by King Władysław Jagiełło
- the sword of Bolesław the Bold
- the sword of Sigismund I the Old
- three hats fringed with pearls
- a large chest with jewel boxes, which contained a large ruby, a 0.94 carats (188 mg) diamond, 200 diamonds, a large emerald, among others.

Also a private treasury of the Vasas (kept at the Royal Castle in Warsaw) consisted of:

- the "Swedish Crown" made for King Sigismund II Augustus
- the "Muscovy Crown" made in about 1610 for Prince Władysław Vasa's coronation as a Tsar of Russia
- a silver White Eagle heraldic base for the royal crown (pure silver, partly gilded, 89 cm high); the eagle was created for King John II Casimir in Augsburg by Abraham Drentwett and Heinrich Mannlich in about 1666; presented in the times of a military weakness of the Polish–Lithuanian Commonwealth after the Deluge and lost war against the Ottoman Empire to Tsar of Russia by King Michael Korybut.

In 1697 a Freiburg goldsmith Johann Friedrich Klemm executed a replacement for the regalia, known as the Crown of Augustus II the Strong and intended for his coronation as a King of Poland. It was never used however, because two monks broke into the State Treasury in the Wawel Castle and stole the original regalia. The Augustus II Crown is kept in the Dresden Armory.

All of the original crown regalia were looted by the Prussians (except for the "Muscovy Crown") in 1795 after the Third Partition of the Commonwealth and destroyed on the order of Frederick William III of Prussia in March 1809 (except for the Szczerbiec).

In 1925 Polish government purchased the silver regalia of King Augustus III and Queen Maria Josepha in Vienna for $35,000 (175,000 zł). It consisted of two crowns, two sceptres and two orbs made in about 1733. The original Crown Regalia were hidden by Franciszek Maksymilian Ossoliński during the War of the Polish Succession. The jewels were exhibited in Warsaw until 1939 and in 1940 they were stolen by German forces. Later they were found by the Soviet troops in Germany and sent to the USSR where they remained until 1960, when they were returned to Poland. Today they are deposited in the National Museum in Warsaw.

=== Gallery ===
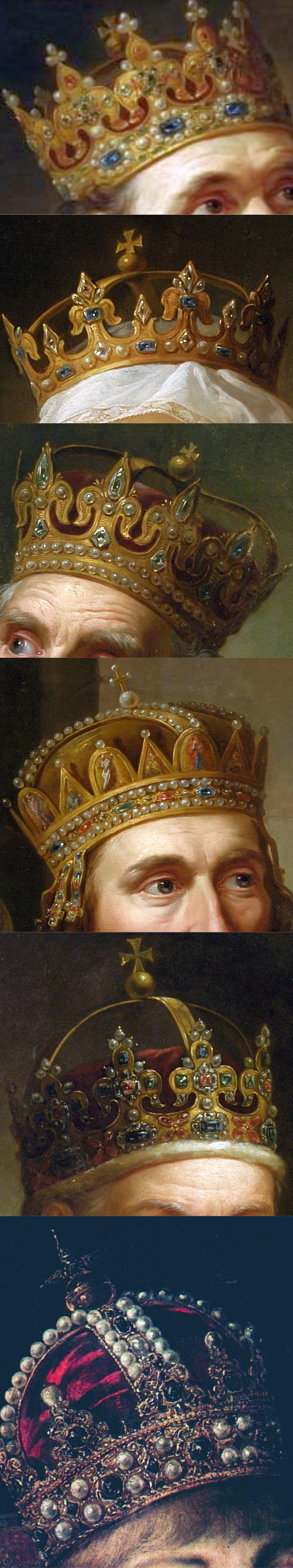
Polish crowns

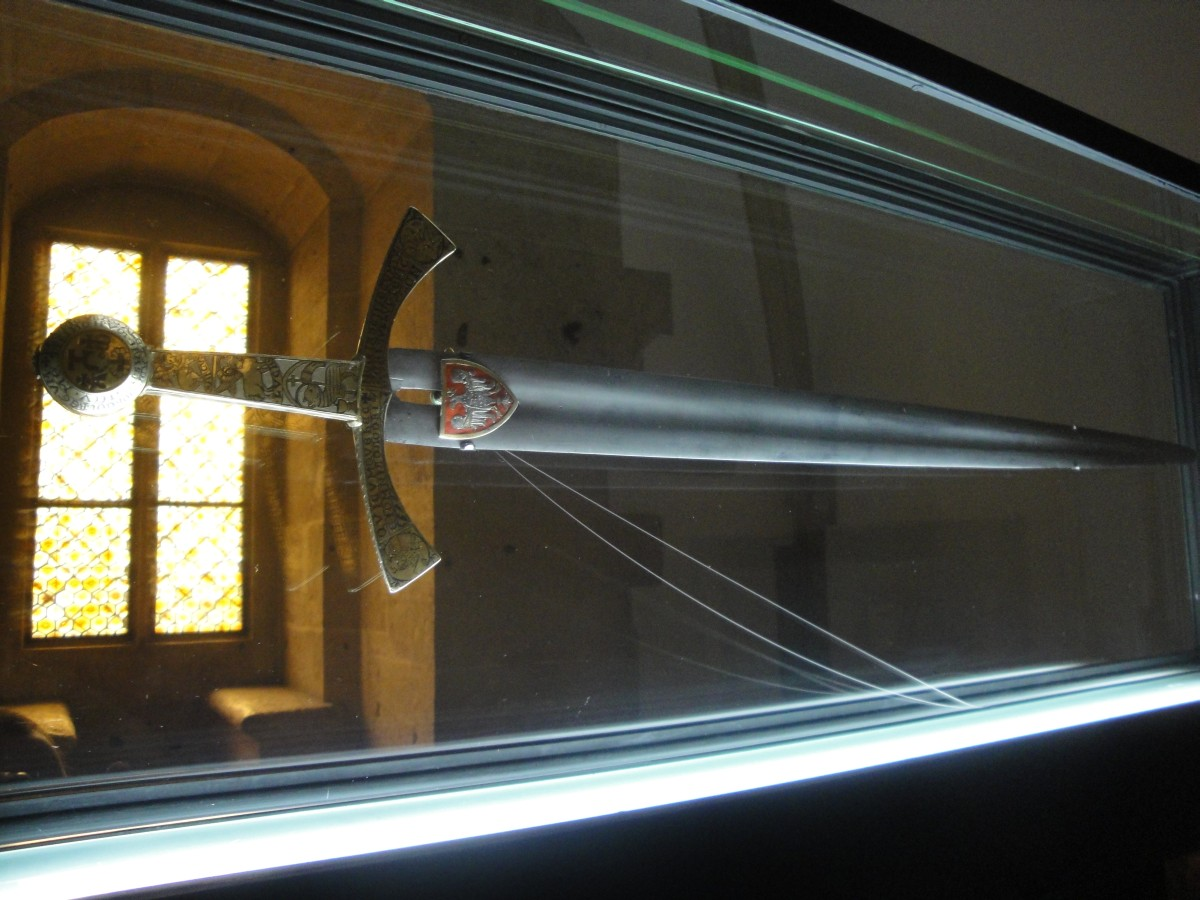
The Szczerbiec (Polish coronation sword; obverse)

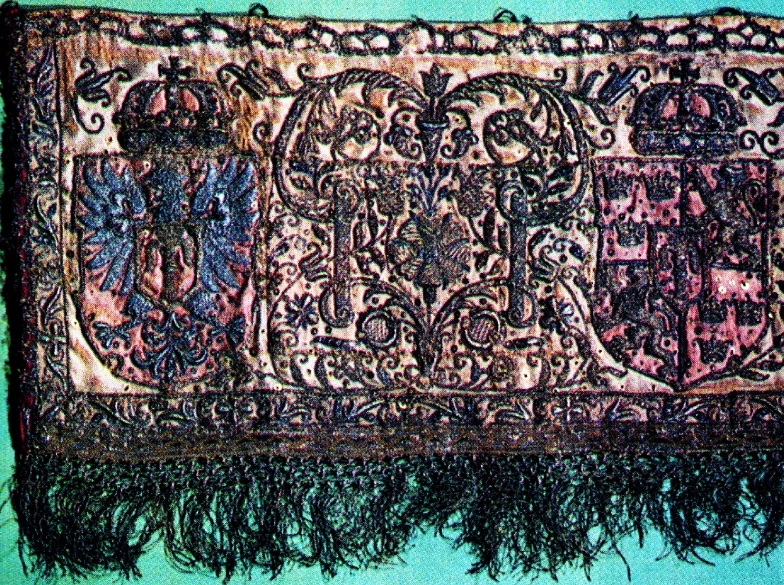
Coronation robe of Władysław IV (detail) with Polish and Swedish Coats of arms

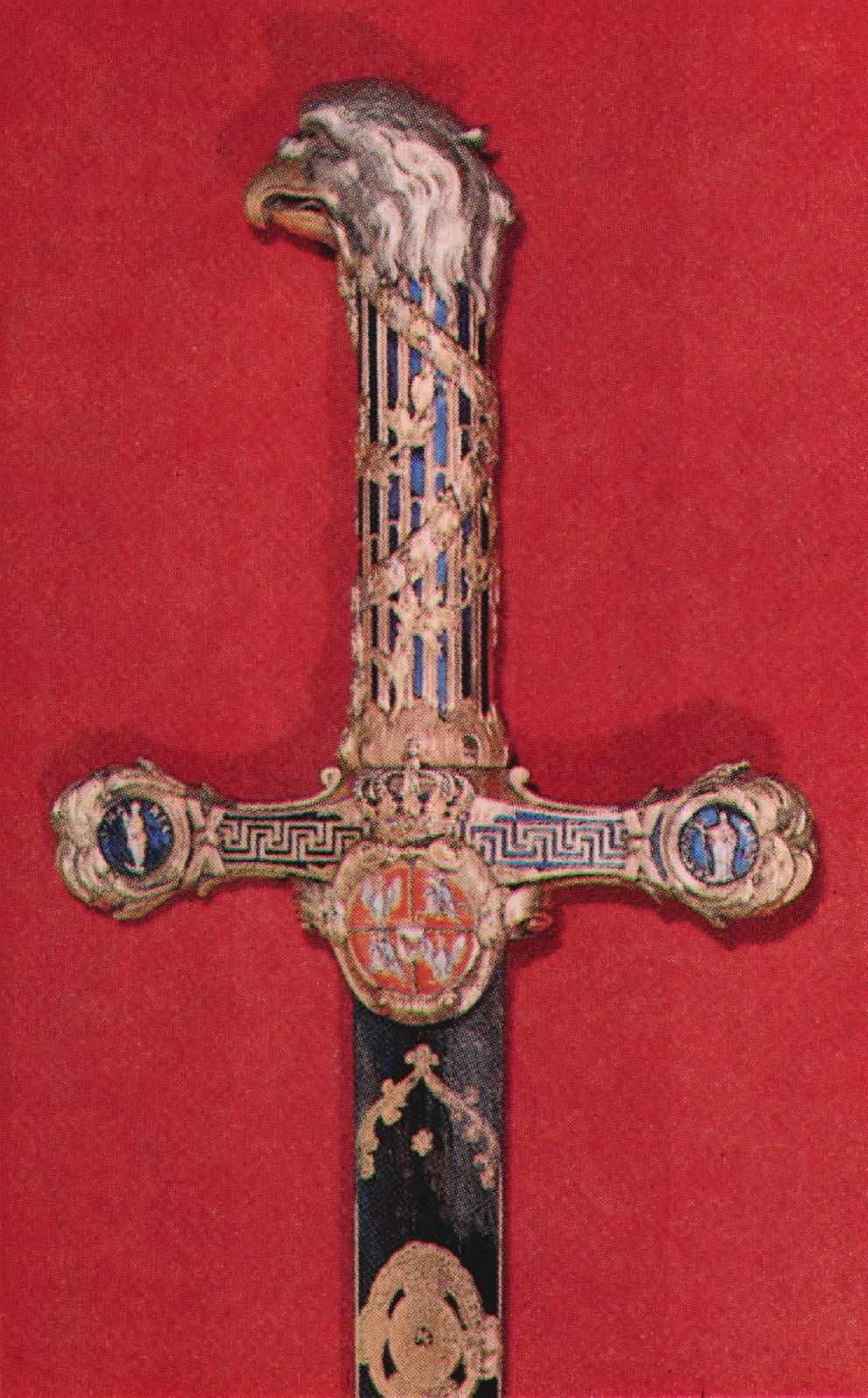
Ceremonial sword of King Stanisław II August

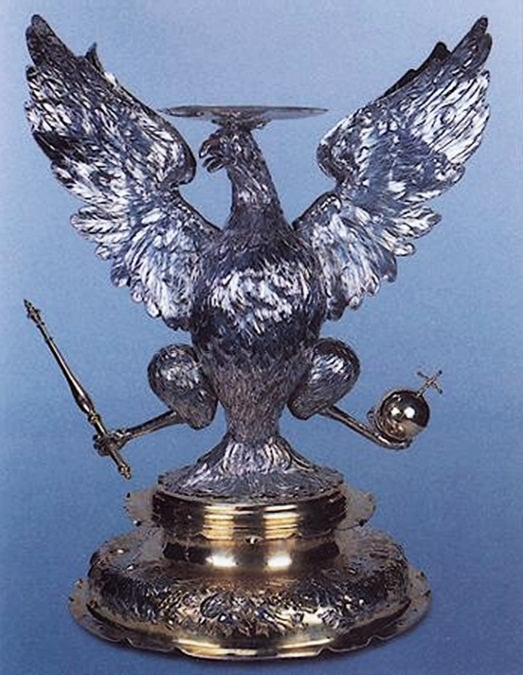
Silver White Eagle heraldic base for the royal crown

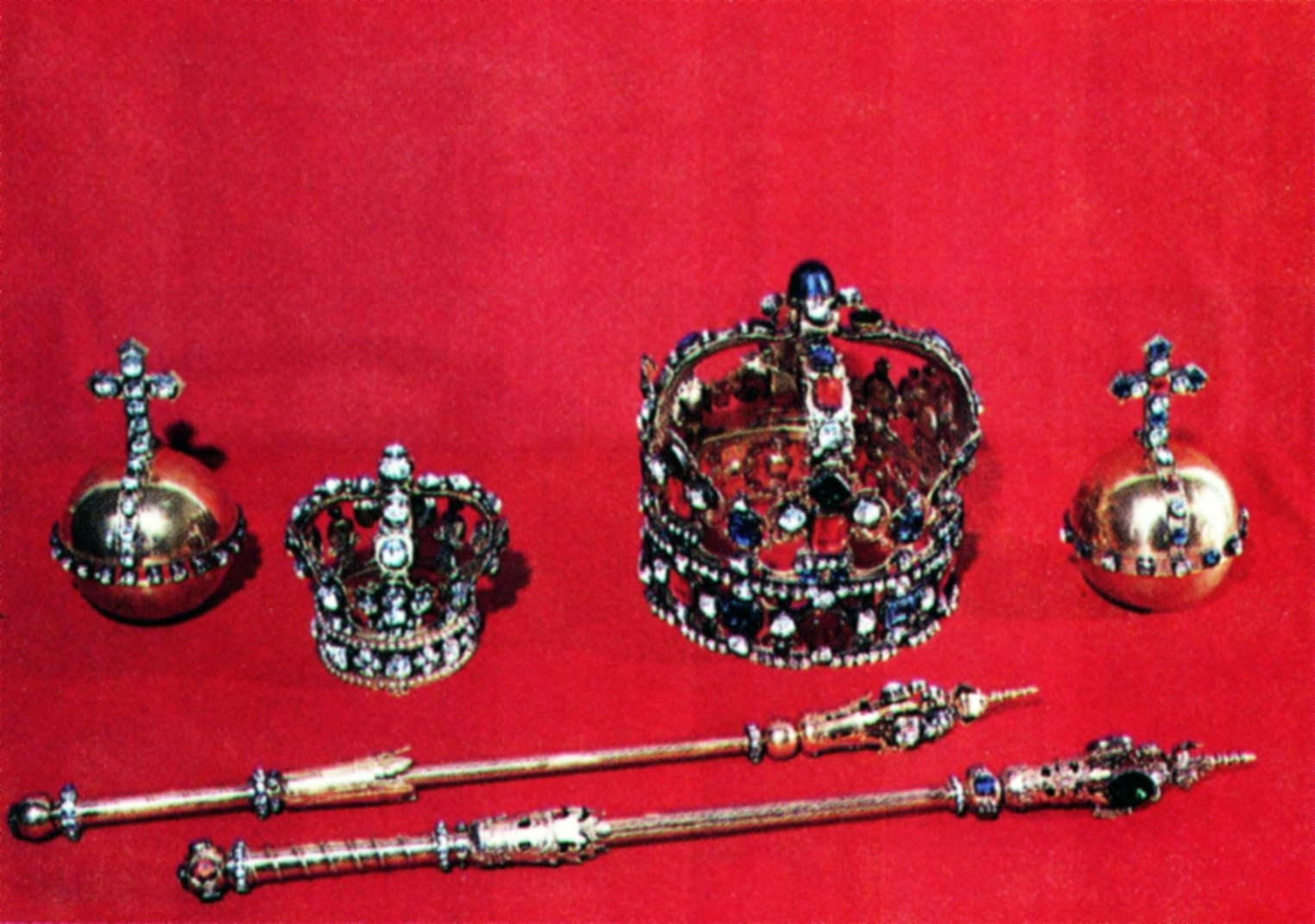
Silver regalia of King Augustus III of Poland and Queen Maria Josepha

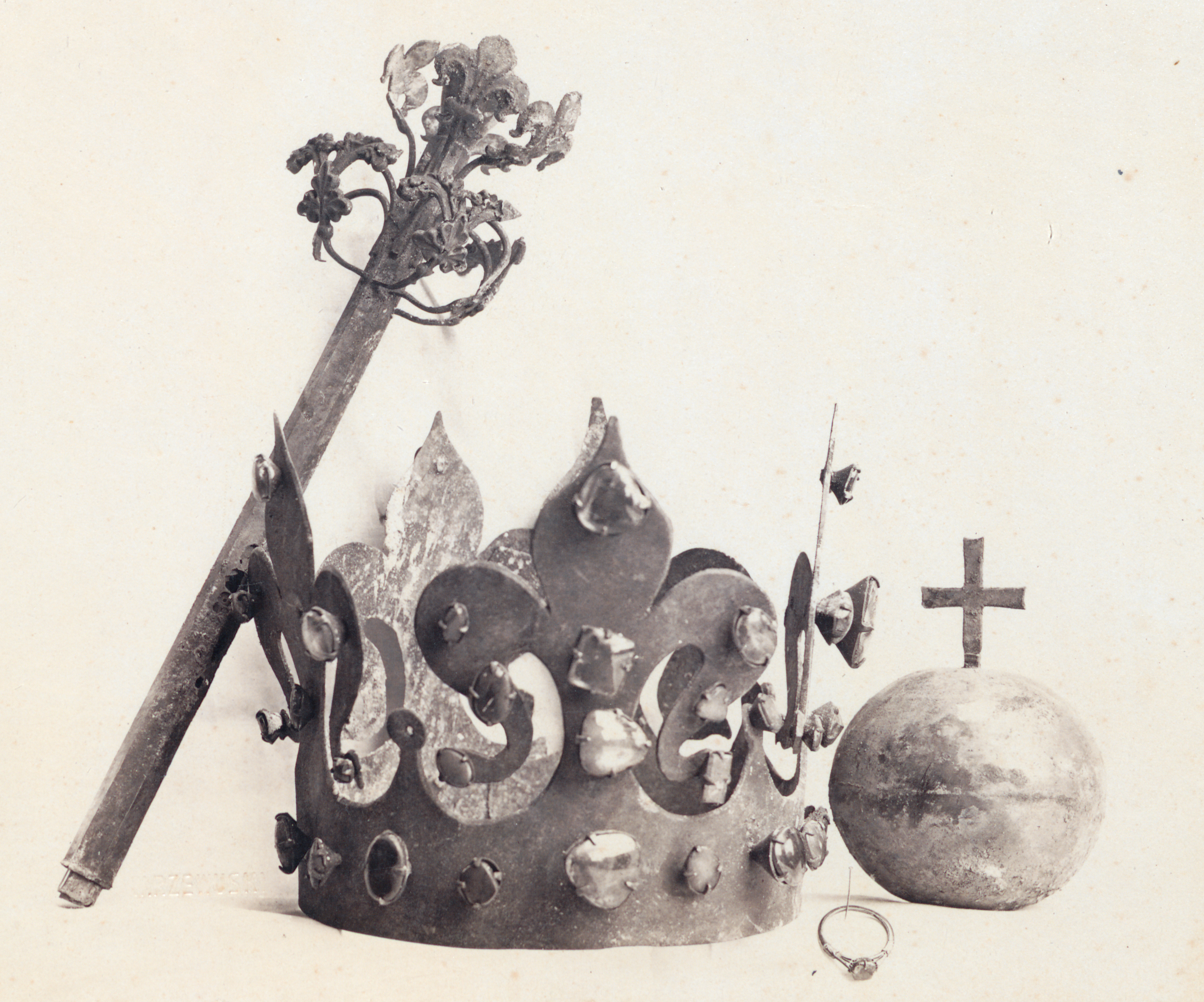
Funeral regalia of King Casimir III the Great

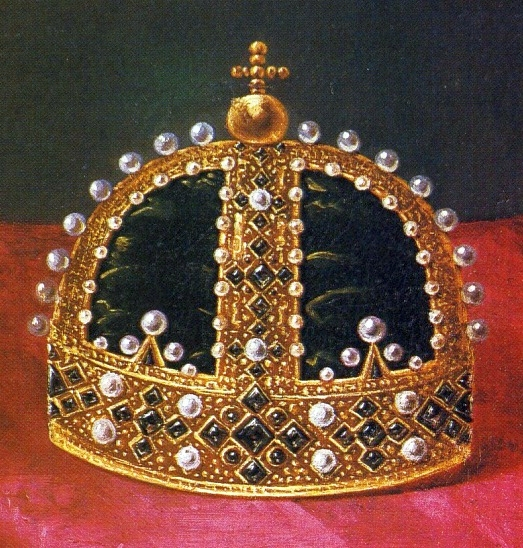
Crown of King Władysław IV

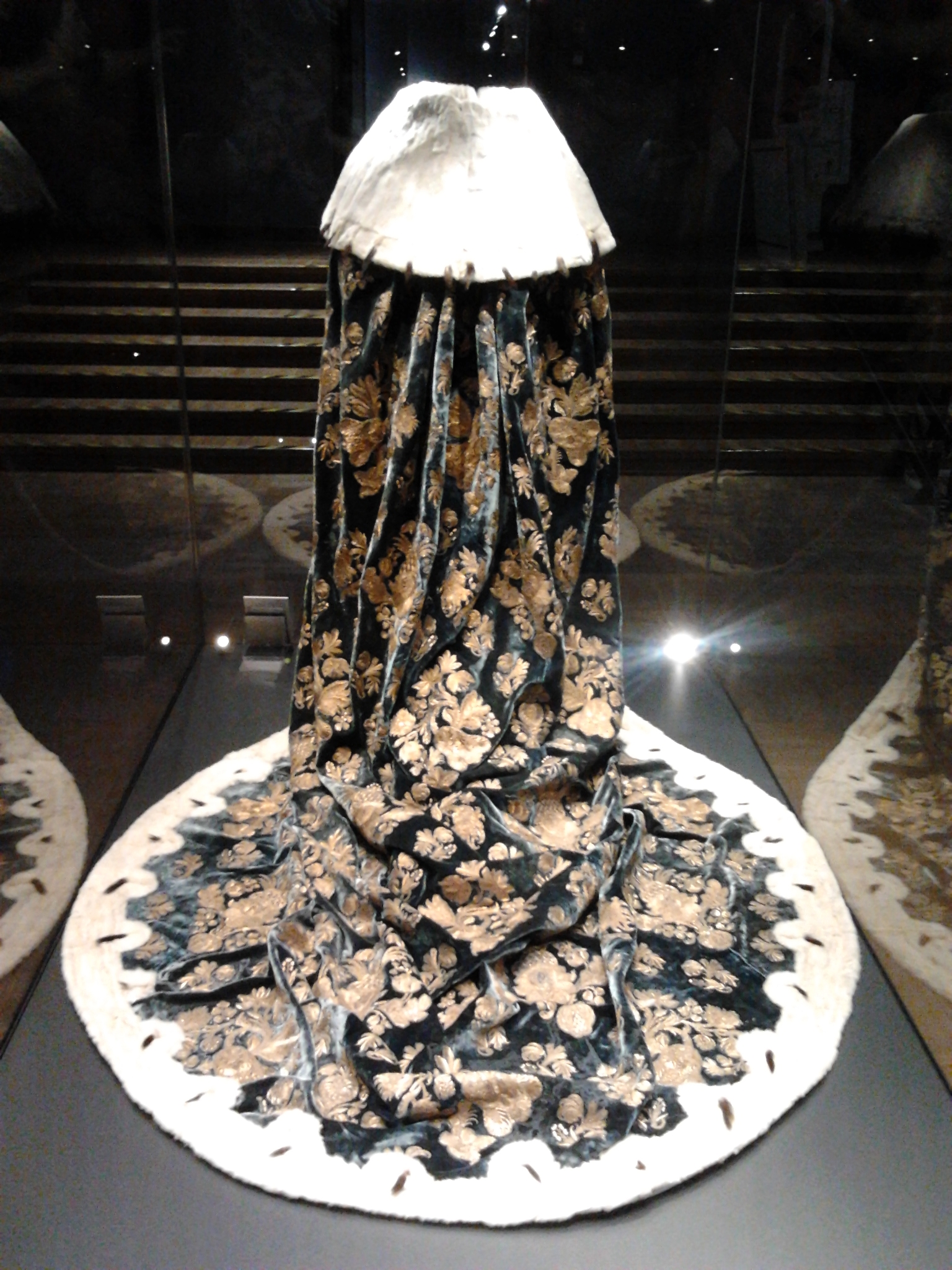
Coronation mantle of Augustus III held at the National Museum in Warsaw

== See also ==
- Crown jewels
- Royal coronations in Poland
- Gniezno Cathedral
- Wawel Cathedral
- St. John's Cathedral
- Royal Casket
- Płock Diadem
- Gediminas' Cap, a cap used during the inaugurations of Lithuanian monarchs until 1569 when a Polish crown was started to be used for crowning the joint Polish–Lithuanian monarchs.

== Bibliography ==
- Marek Żukow-Karczewski, Klejnoty i insygnia koronacyjne w dawnej Polsce. Prawdy i legendy (Crown jewels and insignia in the former Poland. Truth and legend), "Życie Literackie", No. 32, 1987, p. 5 (in Polish)
