= Homagial Crown =

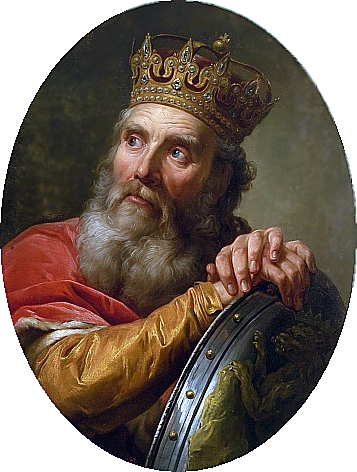
Portrait of King Casimir III the Great wearing the "Homagial Crown"

The Homagial Crown (Polish: Korona Homagialna), also known under its Latin name as the Corona Homagialis, was a part of the Polish Crown Jewels. It was mentioned for the first time in the 15th century in the inventory of the Wawel Royal Treasury. It was probably the coronation crown of Władysław II Jagiełło.

== History ==
In the 15th century crown inventories of treasures of Wawel Castle there appear two crowns called homagial, which are considered to have been the property of Jadwiga of Anjou and Jogaila (Władysław II Jagiełło). From the 16th century, the coronation regalia inventories mention only one of these insignia (attributed to Władysław II), the second was probably cashed.

This crown was worn by the Polish kings during the homage ceremony, replacing the Crown of Bolesław I the Brave. It was used for the last time during a ceremony in Warsaw in 1764, when the king Stanisław August Poniatowski received a tribute from Peter von Biron, Duke of Courland and Semigallia.

The crown was stolen from Wawel Castle by Prussian troops in 1794 and found its place in the collection of the Hohenzollerns in Berlin. After 1809 it was destroyed and melted down, as was the case with the majority of Polish regalia.

The Homagial Crown was made of pure gold in the form of rims covered with a globe and a cross at their intersection. It consisted of nine segments, each crowned with heraldic fleur-de-lis, and decorated with rubies, sapphires and pearls. In total there were 178 precious stones. In the 18th century the crown was depicted in the portrait of Casimir III the Great by Marcello Bacciarelli, painted to embellish the Marble Room at the Royal Castle in Warsaw.
