= Hungarian Crown =

Polish crown jewel

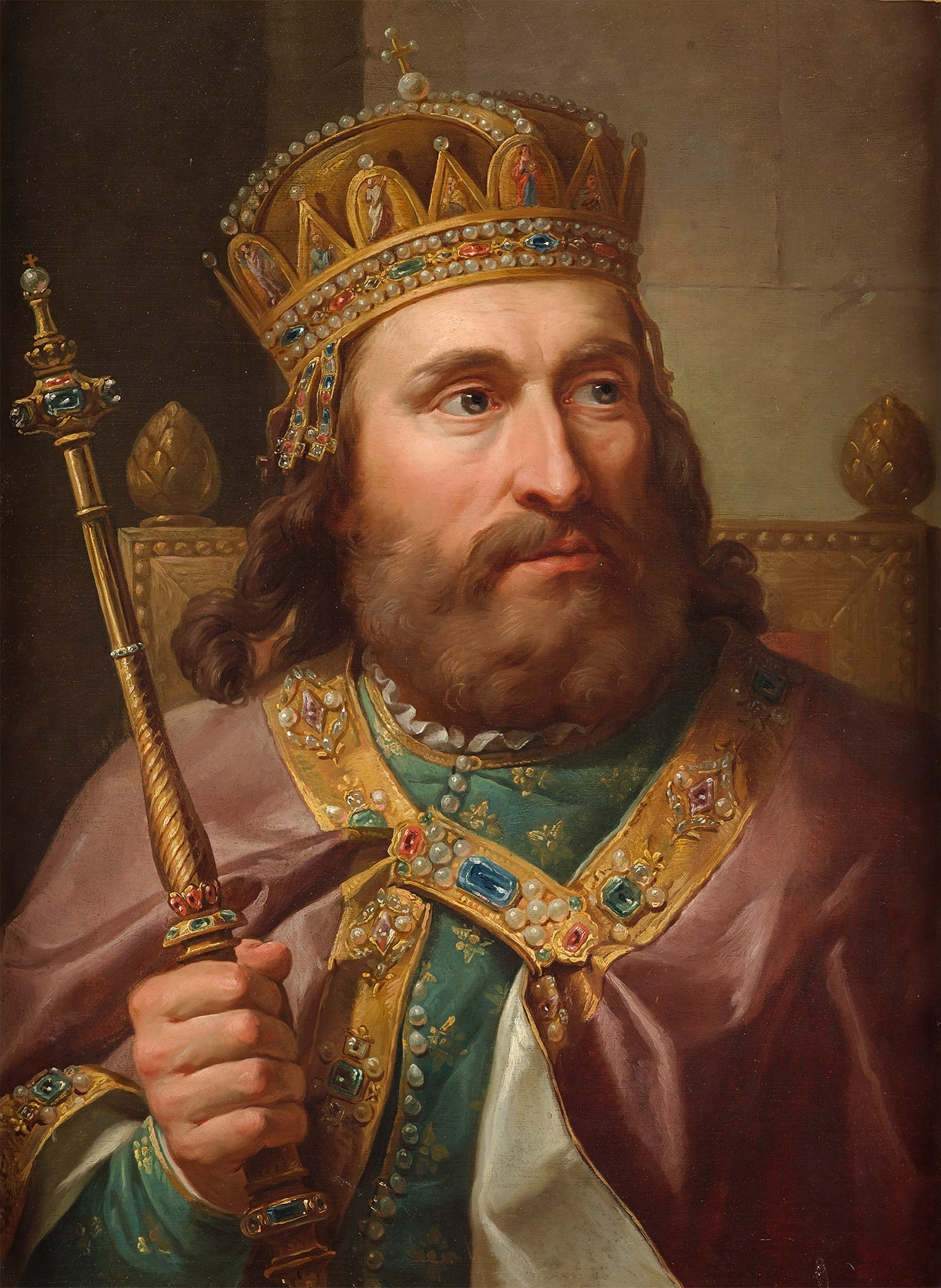
Portrait of King Louis I of Hungary wearing the "Hungarian Crown"

The Hungarian Crown (Polish: Korona Węgierska) was a part of the Polish crown jewels. It was made in the 16th century, resembling the Crown of Saint Stephen, as a private crown of John II Sigismund Zápolya.

== History ==
The original Hungarian Regalia were handed over by Queen Isabella Jagiellon to Ferdinand of Austria in 1551, when she was forced to leave Transylvania, which fell into Ferdinand's hands in accordance with the treaty of Nyírbátor. According to a contemporary Polish chronicler, she broke the cross off the Crown of Saint Stephen’s peak for her son, John Sigismund Zápolya. The copy of the main Hungarian insignium was probably made at that time.

After John Sigismund's death the crown was inherited in 1571 by King Sigismund II Augustus of Poland, Isabella's brother. The Polish king treated the crown of Hungary as a family keepsake, and kept it in a private vault in the Tykocin Castle. In 1572, when the last of the Jagiellons died the insignium was used as an exequial crown during the funeral ceremonies to Sigismund Augustus in Knyszyn and eventually passed to his sister Anna Jagiellon. After the king's death the opposition led by the primate, made the guardian of the Wawel Royal Treasury, refused to bestow the Polish royal insignia on the newly elected Anna Jagiellon and her husband Stephen Báthory. Unable to use the Crown of Bolesław I the Brave, Báthory used the Hungarian Crown as an alternative.

In about 1576 the crown was bequeathed to the State Treasury at the Wawel Castle, where it was kept until October 1795. It was then stolen by Prussian soldiers after the seizure of Kraków by the Prussian army, and was appropriated to the collections of the Hohenzollerns in Berlin. After 1809 it was destroyed, as was the majority of Polish regalia.

The Hungarian Crown was made in the form of rims topped with a globe and a cross at their intersection. It was decorated with enamel plaques, filigree work, pendants and precious stones including four large sapphires and rubies. In the 18th century the crown was depicted in the portrait of Louis I of Hungary by Marcello Bacciarelli, painted to embellish the Marble Room at the Royal Castle in Warsaw.
