= Queen's Crown =

Part of historical Polish Crown Jewels

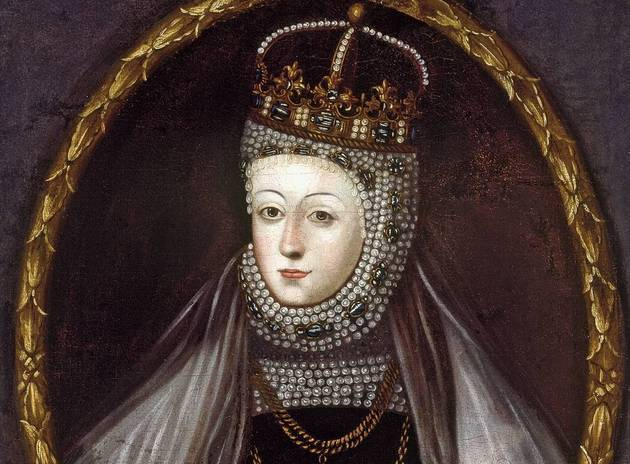
Barbara Radziwiłł with the Queen's Crown on her head, 18th century copy of 16th century coronation portrait of the queen, unknown author.

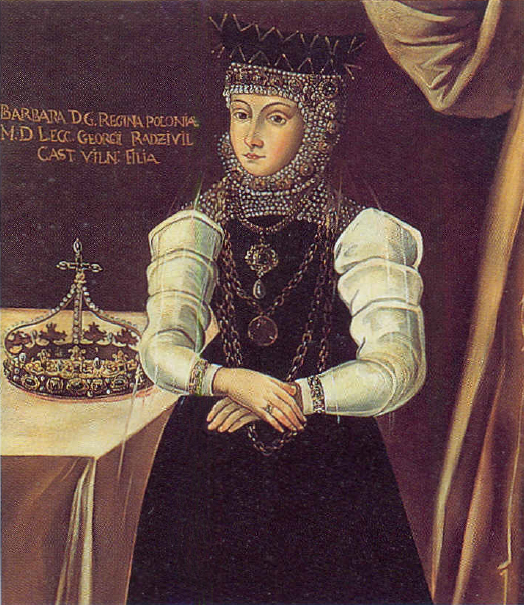
Queen Barbara Radziwiłł next to her crown, image painted in the late 16th century, unknown author

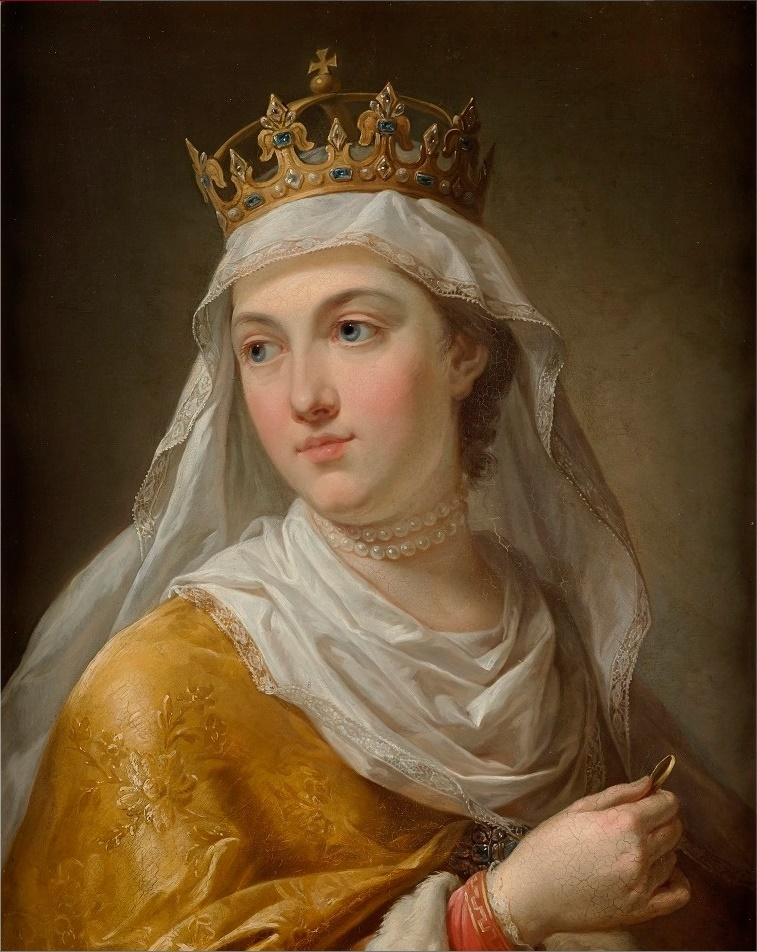
Portrait of King Jadwiga of Poland wearing the "Queen's Crown"

The Queen's Crown (Polish: "korona królowych" or "korona Jadwigi kaliskiej") was a part of the Polish Crown Jewels until it was destroyed in 1809. It was mentioned for the first time in the inventory of the Wawel Royal Treasury in the 15th century.

== History ==
The Polish Queen's coronation insignia were originally made for Jadwiga of Kalisz, wife of Władysław I the Elbow-high in 1320, intended for her coronation as a Queen consort of Poland. Since that time it served as the main insignium of the Polish Queens till the end of the 17th century.

The crown was stolen from the Wawel Castle by the Prussian troops in 1794 and found its place in the collections of the Hohenzollerns in Berlin. After 1809 it was destroyed and melted down just as the majority of Polish regalia.

The Queen's Crown consisted of eight segments each crowned with heraldic fleur-de-lis and interspersed with smaller pinnacles. It was made of pure gold in the form of the rims covered with the globe and a cross on their intersection. The 18th century surveys of the Wawel Royal Treasury indicate that it was decorated with 40 rubies, 40 sapphires and 63 pearls. The 16th century inventory shows, however, that the crown has been much richer in precious stones for some time, and that their number was greater than those placed on the Crown of Bolesław I the Brave. In the 18th century the crown was depicted in the portrait of Saint King Jadwiga of Poland by Marcello Bacciarelli, painted to embellish the Marble Room at the Royal Castle in Warsaw.
