= Szczerbiec =

Polish coronation sword

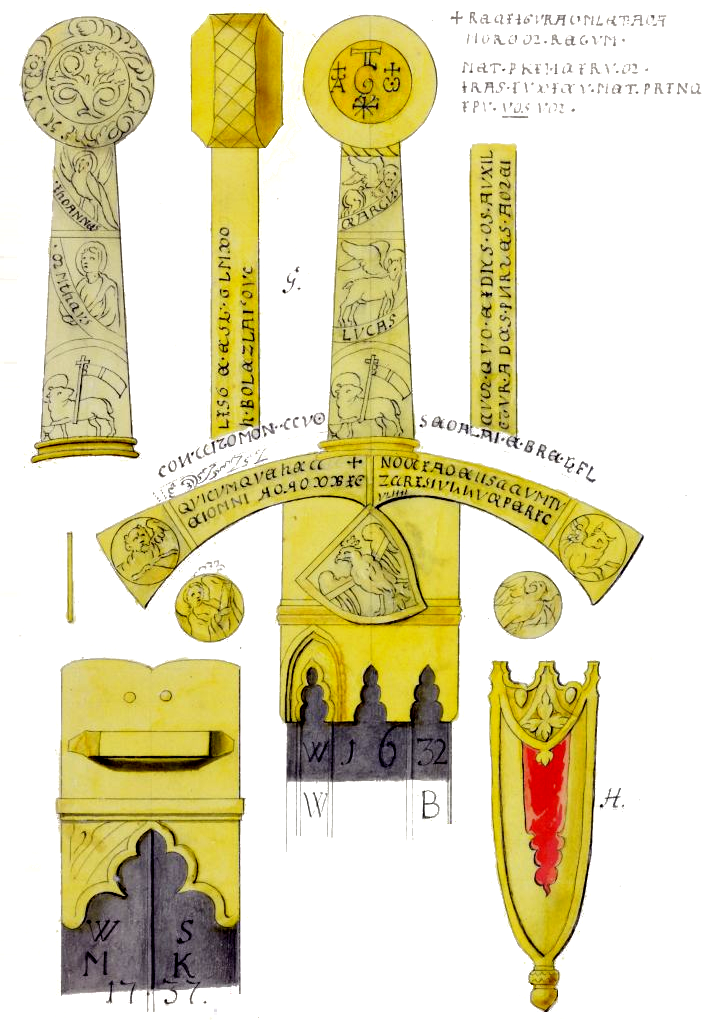
- Pictorial documentation of Szczerbiec made in 1764 by Johann Christoph Werner, court painter to King Stanislaus Augustus of Poland
- Type: Ceremonial weapon
- Place of origin: Poland (possibly Rhineland)

Service history
- In service: 13th century as a sword of justice, 1320–1764 as a coronation sword
- Used by: Poland

Production history
- Produced: Late 12th or 13th century

Specifications
- Mass: 1.26 kg (2.8 lb)
- Length: 98.4 cm (3.23 ft)
- Blade length: 82 cm (2.69 ft)
- Width: 20 cm (7.9 in)
- Blade type: Straight double-edged (Oakeshott type XII)
- Hilt type: Flat with an arched crossguard (Oakeshott type 6) and a flat round pommel (Oakeshott type I)

Szczerbiec (Polish pronunciation: [ˈʂt͡ʂɛr.bʲɛt͡s]) is the ceremonial sword used in the coronations of most Polish monarchs from 1320 to 1764. It now is displayed in the treasure vault of the royal Wawel Castle in Kraków, as the only preserved part of the medieval Polish crown jewels. The sword is noted for its hilt, decorated with magical formulae, Christian symbols, and floral patterns, as well as for the narrow slit in the blade which holds a small shield with the coat of arms of Poland. The name of the sword is derived from the Polish word szczerba ("gap", "notch", or "chip"), and its meaning is incorrectly perceived as "the Notched Sword" or "the Jagged Sword" (which is included in the sword's legend), though the edges of its blade are straight and smooth. Proper meaning and rendering into English would be "the Notching/Jagging Sword" — as "a sword that is meant to notch/jag other weapons".

The legend links Szczerbiec with King Boleslaus I the Brave who was said to have chipped the sword by hitting it against the Golden Gate of Kiev during his intervention in the Kievan succession crisis in 1018. However, the Golden Gate was only constructed in 1037 and the sword is actually dated to the late 12th or 13th century. It was first used as a coronation sword by Ladislaus the Short in 1320. Looted by Prussian troops in 1795, it changed hands several times during the 19th century until it was purchased in 1884 for the Hermitage Museum in Saint Petersburg. The Soviet Union returned it to Poland in 1928 as part of war reparations for their loss against Poland in the Polish-Soviet war. During the Second World War, Szczerbiec was evacuated to Canada and did not return to Kraków until 1959. In the 20th century, an image of the sword was adopted as a symbol by Polish nationalist and far-right movements.

== Description ==
Szczerbiec is a 98 cm-long (39 in) ceremonial sword bearing rich Gothic ornamentation, dated to the mid-13th century. It is classified as a type XII sword with a type I pommel and a type 6 crossguard according to the Oakeshott typology, although the blade may have changed its shape due to centuries of corrosion and intensive cleaning before every coronation.

=== Hilt ===
Schematic diagram of the shapes and dimensions of the principal elements of Szczerbiec (ornamentation not shown)

The hilt consists of a round pommel, a flat grip and an arched crossguard. The grip is 10.1 cm (4.0 in) long, 1.2 cm (0.5 in) thick, and from 2 to 3 cm (0.8 to 1.2 in) wide. It is rectangular in cross-section and its hard edges make it difficult to handle and impractical for fighting, which is indicative of the sword's purely ceremonial usage. The pommel is 4.5 cm (1.8 in) in diameter and 2.6 cm (1.0 in) thick, with a chamfered outer ring that is 1.3 cm (0.5 in) wide. The crossguard forms an arch that is 1.8 cm (0.7 in) wide in the middle and widens up to 3.4 cm (1.3 in) at both ends. It is 1 cm (0.4 in) thick near the grip and measures 20 cm (8 in) in length along its upper edge.

The pommel and the crossguard are made of silver. The core of the grip is a brass chest encasing the tang of the blade. It was probably made in the 19th century to replace an original organic core, which had decomposed. At the same time the tang was riveted to the top of the pommel. The head of the rivet, which is 0.5 cm (0.2 in) in diameter, rests atop a rectangular washer measuring 1.1 cm × 1.4 cm (0.43 in × 0.55 in).

All parts of the hilt are covered with golden plates, which are engraved with sharp or rounded styli and decorated with niello, or black metallic inlay that contrasts against the golden background. Each plate is 1 mm (0.04 in) thick and made of about 18-carat gold. The niello designs include inscriptions written in late Romanesque majuscule (with some uncial additions), Christian symbols, and floral patterns. The floral ornaments are in negative, that is, golden against a black, nielloed background.

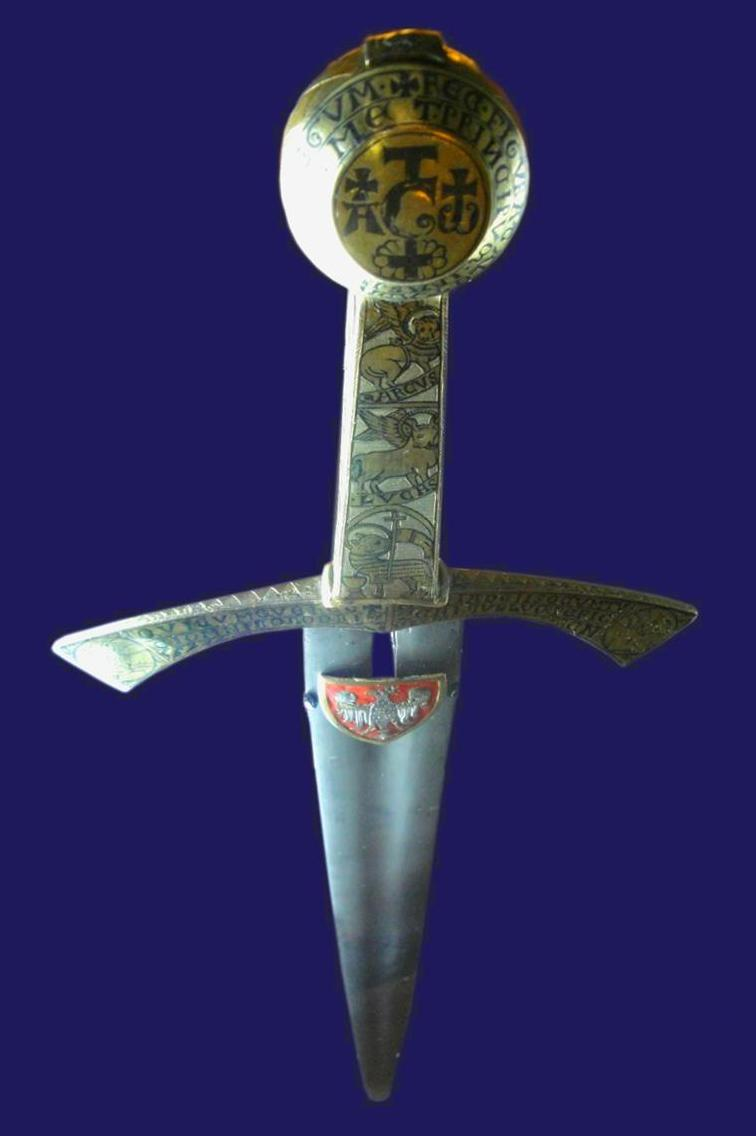
Obverse side of Szczerbiec (perspective-distorted)

On the obverse side of the hilt, the pommel bears a large stylized letter T on top of a letter C or G (the latter could be just a decorative element of the letter T) between the Greek letters Α and ω (alpha and omega) surmounted with little crosses. Below the letter T, there is another cross placed within a cloud or flower with twelve petals. On the chamfered edge around this design runs a circular Latin inscription in two rings which reads: Rec figura talet ad amorem regum / et principum iras iudicum ("This sign rouses the love of kings and princes, the wrath of judges"). The grip bears the symbols of two of the Four Evangelists: the lion of Saint Mark and the ox of Saint Luke, as well as an Agnus Dei (Lamb of God). The crossguard bears the following Latin inscription: Quicumque hec / nomina Deii secum tu/lerit nullum periculum / ei omnino nocebit ("Whoever will carry these names of God with him, no danger will harm him").

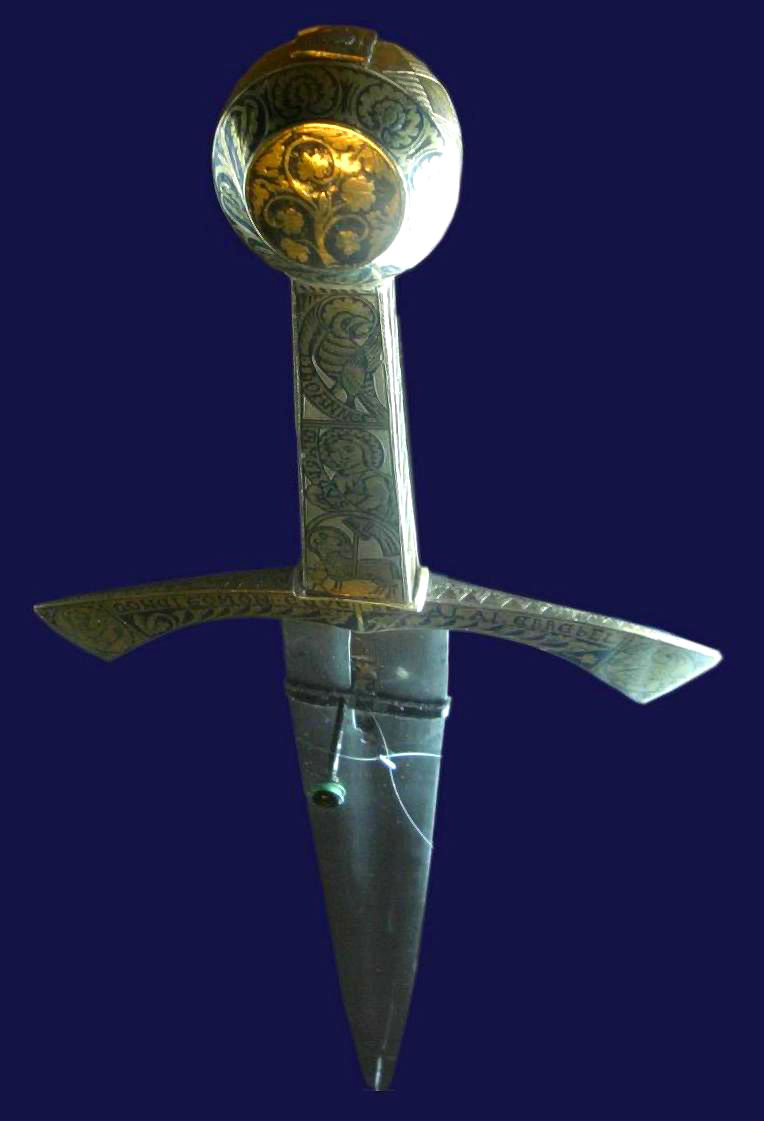
Reverse side of Szczerbiec (perspective-distorted)

The reverse side of the pommel is decorated with a vine bush surrounded by a wreath of vine leaves. On the reverse of the grip, there are the eagle of Saint John and the angel of Saint Matthew, and another Agnus Dei. The crossguard bears, above another pattern of vine leaves, an inscription in corrupted Hebrew in Latin script: Con citomon Eeve Sedalai Ebrebel ("Fervent faith incite the names of God: Sedalai and Ebrehel"). On the opposite ends of the crossguard, there are again the symbols of Saints John and Matthew.

The circumference of the pommel is decorated with a rhombic pattern, while the upper side of the crossguard – with a similar triangular pattern. The narrow sides of the grip used to be embellished with inscribed silver plates, which, however, were lost in the 19th century. These lost inscriptions are partly known from graphical documentation made by King Stanislaus Augustus's court painter, Johann Christoph Werner, in 1764 and by Jacek Przybylski in 1792. One of the plates had already been broken by that time with only part of the inscription preserved: Liste est glaud... h Bolezlai Duc... ("This is a sword of... Duke Boleslaus..."); the inscription on the other plate continued: Cum quo ei D[omi]n[us] SOS [Salvator Omnipotens Salvator] auxiletur ad[ver]sus partes amen ("With whom is the Omnipotent Lord and Savior, to help him against his enemies. Amen"). The missing part of the first inscription is only known from an old replica of Szczerbiec which once belonged to the Radziwiłł family (see Historical replicas below). The full inscription read: Iste est gladius Principis et haeredis Boleslai Ducis Poloniae et Masoviae, Lanciciae ("This is a sword of Hereditary Prince Boleslaus, Duke of Poland, Masovia, and Łęczyca"). The identity of this Duke Boleslaus is uncertain.

Ornamentation and inscriptions on the hilt
	Obverse		Narrow side	Reverse		Narrow side
Pommel	Inscription on the obverse of the pommel of Szczerbiec Middle circle: Stylized letter T (or T on top of a C) between the letters alpha and omega surmounted with crosses, above a cross within a dodecafoil rosette		Rhombic pattern	Inscription on the reverse of the pommel of Szczerbiec Middle circle: Vine bush		Rhombic pattern
Pommel	Chamfered outer ring: Inscription: + REC. FIGVRA. TALET. AD AMOREM. REGVM. ET. PRINCIPVM. IRAS IUDICV. M		Rhombic pattern	Chamfered outer ring: Vine leaves		Rhombic pattern
Grip	Ornamentation on the obverse of the grip of Szczerbiec	Top: Winged lion of Saint Mark, inscription: MARCVS	Inscription: LIST E. EST. GLAUD… h.BOLEZLAI ‘DVC… (now lost and replaced with a rhombic pattern)	Ornamentation on the reverse of the grip of Szczerbiec	Top: Eagle of Saint John, inscription: IhOANNES	Inscription: CVM. QVO. EI DNS. OS. AVXIL ETVR. ADUS. PARTES. AMEN (now lost and replaced with wax filling)
Grip	Ornamentation on the obverse of the grip of Szczerbiec	Middle: Winged ox of Saint Luke, inscription: LVCAS	Inscription: LIST E. EST. GLAUD… h.BOLEZLAI ‘DVC… (now lost and replaced with a rhombic pattern)	Ornamentation on the reverse of the grip of Szczerbiec	Middle: Angel of Saint Matthew, inscription: MMThCVS	Inscription: CVM. QVO. EI DNS. OS. AVXIL ETVR. ADUS. PARTES. AMEN (now lost and replaced with wax filling)
Grip	Ornamentation on the obverse of the grip of Szczerbiec	Bottom: Lamb of God	Inscription: LIST E. EST. GLAUD… h.BOLEZLAI ‘DVC… (now lost and replaced with a rhombic pattern)	Ornamentation on the reverse of the grip of Szczerbiec	Bottom: Lamb of God	Inscription: CVM. QVO. EI DNS. OS. AVXIL ETVR. ADUS. PARTES. AMEN (now lost and replaced with wax filling)
Crossguard	Winged lion of Saint Mark	Left end: Winged lion of Saint Mark	Triangular pattern	Angel of Saint Matthew	Left end: Angel of Saint Matthew	Triangular pattern
Crossguard	Inscription on the reverse of the crossguard of Szczerbiec Middle: Inscription: QVICVMQVE hEC + NOMI[N]A DEII SECVM TVLERI[T] NVLLVM PERICVL[VM] CN EI OMNINO NOC[E]BIT		Triangular pattern	Inscription on the obverse of the crossguard of Szczerbiec Middle: Inscription: CON. CITOMON.. EEVE SEDALAI. EBREbEL above an ornament of vine leaves		Triangular pattern
Crossguard	Winged ox of Saint Luke	Right end: Winged ox of Saint Luke	Triangular pattern	Eagle of Saint John	Right end: Eagle of Saint John	Triangular pattern

Use-wear analysis indicates that the plates on the pommel and the crossguard were made by the same artist, while the plates on the grip were added later. The latter – obverse and reverse – were probably decorated in the same workshop and using the same tools, but by two different craftsmen. Moreover, a side plate with a rhombic pattern was added in the 19th century to replace one of the lost inscribed side plates.

Preserved images of Szczerbiec from various points in time indicate that the decorative plates were several times dismounted and placed again on the hilt in variable configurations. The current composition, with the symbols of the Evangelists duplicated on each side of the hilt, matches that known from the earliest preserved depiction drafted by Johann Christoph Werner in 1794. It is possible, though, that the original placement of the golden plates was different, with the symbols of Saints John and Matthew on the obverse of the grip, so that each side of the hilt displayed the symbols of all four of the Evangelists.

=== Blade ===
The blade is 82 cm (32 in) long, up to 5 cm (2 in) wide (about 5 cm from the crossguard) and 3 mm (0.1 in) thick. The fuller is about 74 cm (29 in) long and, on average, 2 cm (0.8 in) wide. Metallographic analysis has shown that the blade was forged from unevenly carburized semi-hard bloomery steel. Apart from iron, the material contains, by weight, 0.6 percent of carbon, 0.153 percent of silicon, 0.092 percent of phosphorus, and other elements. Numerous slag inclusions found in the steel are typical for medieval iron smelting technology. Part of the blade was hardened by quenching. Unlike the hilt, the blade would have been fully functional as a weapon of war. The surface of the blade is covered with deep scratches along its length, a result of intensive cleaning from rust before every coronation, probably with sand or brick powder. Inactive spots of corrosion may be also found on the entire surface.

Just below the hilt, there are three perforations in the fuller of the blade. The largest is a rectangular slot that is 64 mm (2.5 in) long and 8.5 mm (0.33 in) wide. This opening, known in Polish as szczyrba or szczerba, was originally caused by rust and, in the 19th century, polished into a regular shape. A small heraldic shield colored with oil paint is fastened to the slot. It is roughly triangular in shape, with the sides measuring from 4 to 4.5 cm (1.6 to 1.8 in). The shield, bearing the White Eagle of Poland, was originally attached to the scabbard, or sheath. The Gothic scabbard, with a golden or silver locket and chape, was probably created in 1320 and lost between 1819 and 1874. The shield is the only preserved element of the sheath. It was tilted to the left – from the onlooker's point of view – while it was fastened to the scabbard's locket, but today it is aligned with the blade. The eagle on the red field of the shield is white, with a golden crown, bands across the wings, ring on the tail, and talons. The two other perforations are round holes, 24 mm (0.94 in) apart. The upper one, just below the slot, is 28 mm (1.1 in) in diameter, while the other measures only 1.4 mm (0.055 in). They were probably punched in the 19th century to fasten the heraldic shield to the blade.

== Location ==
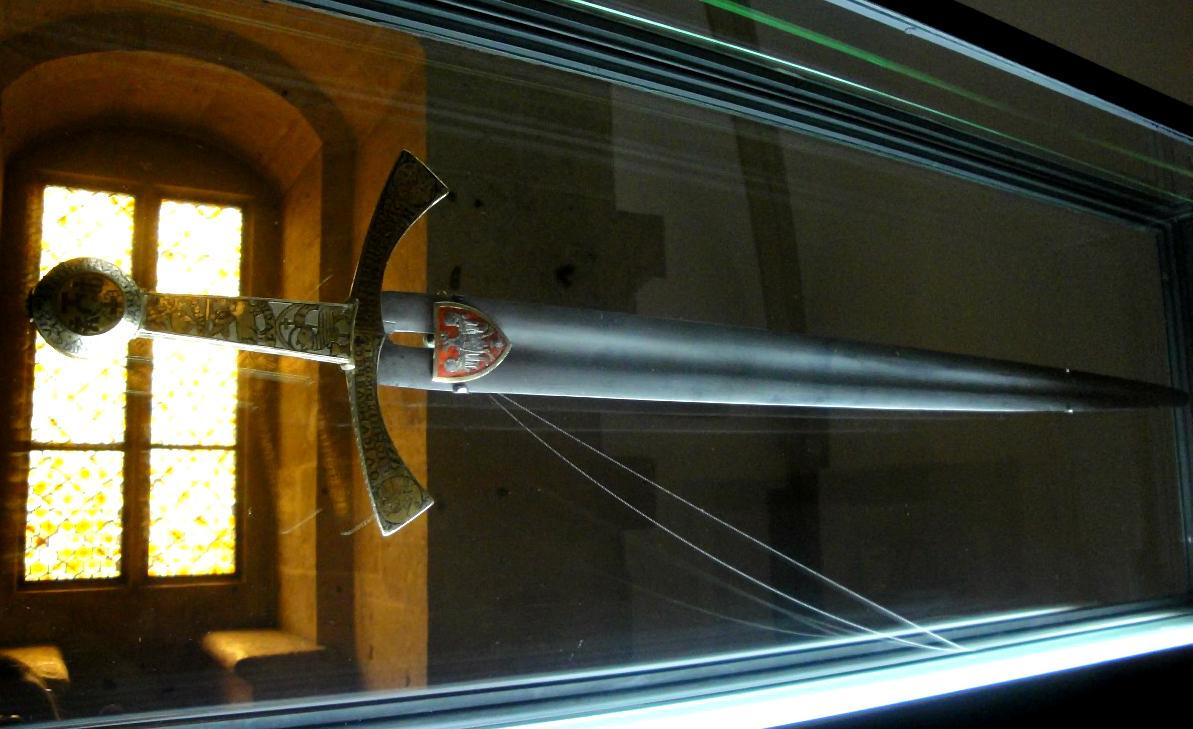
Szczerbiec on display in the Wawel Castle treasure vault

Szczerbiec is owned by the Wawel Royal Castle National Art Collection (inventory number 137) in Kraków, the former capital city of Poland. As the only preserved of Polish medieval coronation insignia, it is a prominent part of the museum's Treasury and Armory permanent exhibition. The sword is suspended horizontally inside a glass case in the middle of the Jagiełło and Hedwig Vault located on the ground floor in the northeastern corner of the Wawel Castle.

== History ==
=== The Szczerbiec of Boleslaus the Brave ===
Historical accounts related to the early history of the Polish coronation sword are scant and often mixed with legend. The earliest known use of the name "Szczerbiec" appeared in the Chronicle of Greater Poland at the turn of the 14th century. According to this source, the sword was given to King Boleslaus the Brave (reigned 992–1025) by an angel; Polish kings were supposed to always carry it in battle to triumph over their enemies. During Boleslaus's invasion of Kievan Rus', he hit it against the Golden Gate of Kyiv while capturing the city. It was the notch that appeared on the edge of the blade which gave the sword its name. This account, written three centuries after the events it describes, is implausible not only because of the customary reference to the sword's supernatural origin (compare Excalibur), but also because Boleslaus's intervention in the Kievan succession crisis took place in 1018, or about 19 years before the actual construction of the Golden Gate in 1037.

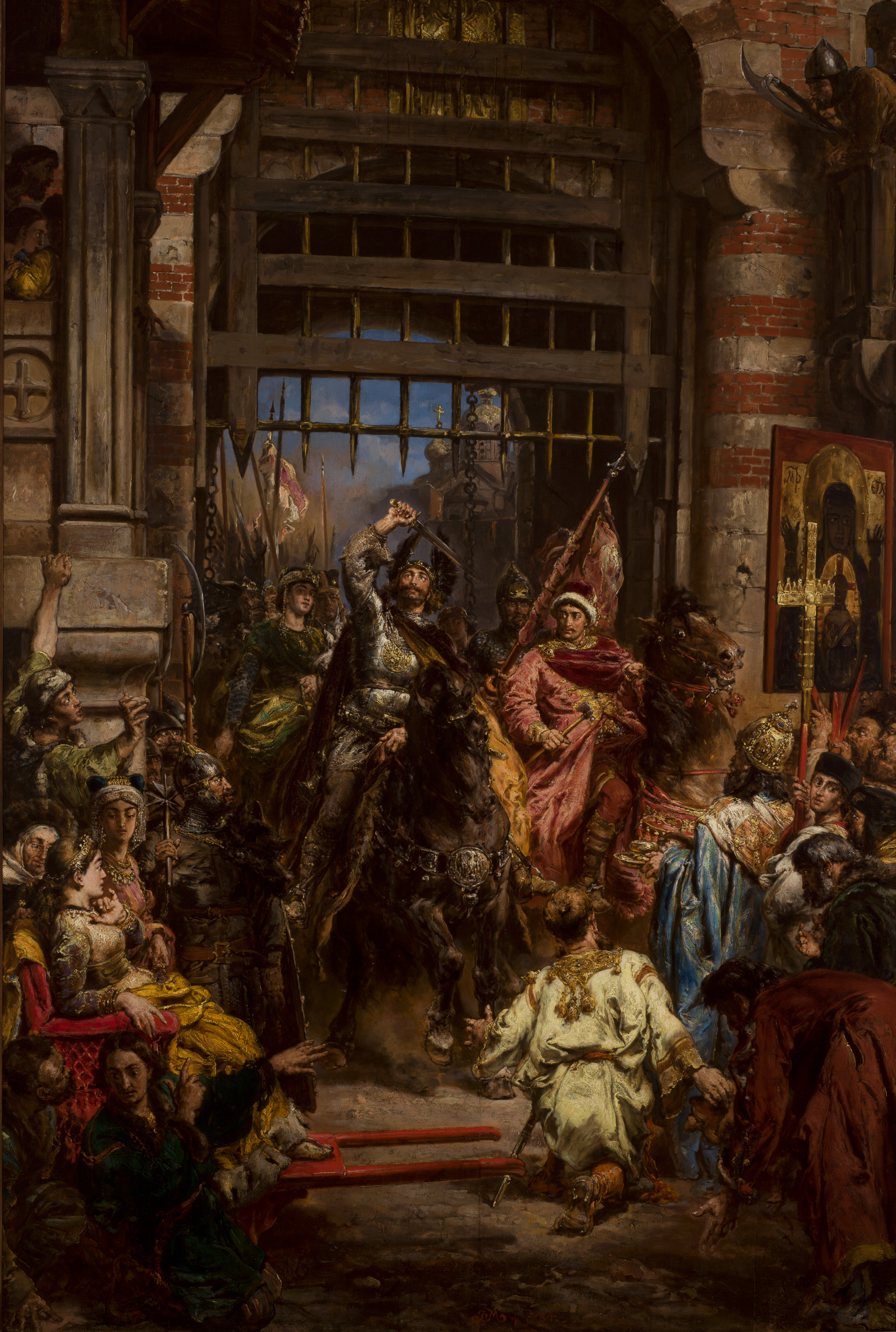
Jan Matejko, Boleslaus the Brave and Sviatopolk at the Golden Gate of Kyiv (1883)

It is plausible, though, that Boleslaus did chip his sword by striking it against an earlier gate in Kiev. His great-grandson, Boleslaus the Bold (r. 1058–1079), hit the Golden Gate with a sword in 1069, which would indicate that it was a customary gesture of gaining control over a city. It is also possible that this sword was preserved as a souvenir of past victories venerated by Boleslaus the Brave's successors. According to Wincenty Kadłubek's Chronicle, Boleslaus Wrymouth (r. 1107–1138) had a favorite sword he called Żuraw or Grus ("Crane"). A scribe who copied the chronicle in 1450 added the word Szczurbycz above the word Żuraw, but whether these two swords were one and the same is uncertain.

According to the Chronicle of Greater Poland, the sword was kept in the treasury of the Wawel Cathedral. The ultimate fate of the original Szczerbiec is unknown. It may have been taken to Prague, together with other royal insignia, by King Wenceslaus II of Bohemia after his coronation as king of Poland in Gniezno in 1300. What happened with these insignia thereafter remains a mystery. Although Boleslaus the Brave's notched sword has not been preserved and even its very existence is doubtful, its legend had a great impact on Polish historical memory and the treatment of its successor, the modern Szczerbiec.

=== From a sword of justice to a coronation sword ===
The sword currently known as Szczerbiec was forged and decorated in a style characteristic of the late 12th and 13th centuries, so it could not have belonged to any of the three great Boleslauses of the 11th and early 12th centuries. Additionally, it is a purely ceremonial sword which, unlike the original Szczerbiec, was never used in combat. It was originally used as a sword of justice (gladius iustitiae), or insignia of the sovereign's judicial power, by one of the many local dukes during Poland's Age of Fragmentation. A silver plate, now lost, on the sword's grip bore an inscription which indicated a duke by the name Boleslaus as its original owner. An inscription on the Radziwiłłs' replica of Szczerbiec, now also lost, could provide an additional hint as to the duke's identity: "Boleslaus, Duke of Poland, Masovia, and Łęczyca" – except that no duke of this name and titles ever existed. Historians have variously identified the duke in question as Boleslaus the Curly (r. 1146–1173), Boleslaus the Chaste (r. 1226–1279), Boleslaus I of Masovia (r. 1229–1248) or Boleslaus the Pious of Greater Poland (r. 1239–1247).

As a coronation sword, Szczerbiec was first specifically mentioned by Jan Długosz in his account of the crowning of King Casimir IV (r. 1447–1492), but it was probably first used in a coronation ceremony by King Ladislaus the Short (r. 1288–1333) in 1320, by which time he had reunited most of the core territories of Poland. If Szczerbiec had previously belonged to his uncle, Boleslaus I of Masovia, or his father-in-law, Boleslaus the Pious, then he could have inherited it. If it had belonged to any of the two Boleslauses who had ruled from Kraków as high dukes of all Poland, then Ladislaus could have simply found it in the Wawel Cathedral. Thereafter, Szczerbiec became an integral part of the Polish Crown Jewels, shared their fate, and was the principal ceremonial sword used in coronations of all Polish kings until 1764, except Jogaila (1386), Stephen Báthory (1576), Stanislaus I Leszczyński (1705), and Augustus III Wettin (1734).

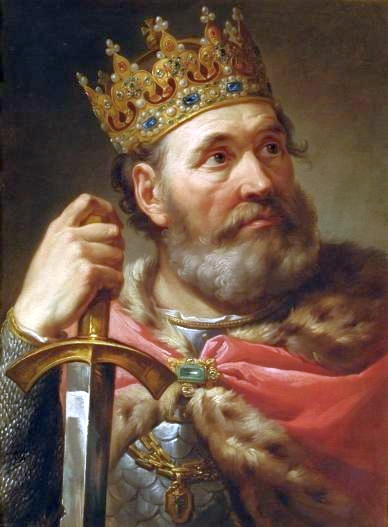
Boleslaus the Brave holding Szczerbiec, as painted by Marcello Bacciarelli in 1771. Note the lack of a slit in the blade and the chipped edge.

Szczerbiec, together with other crown jewels, was removed from the Wawel Hill on several occasions during that period. After his Polish coronation in 1370, King Louis I of Hungary took the crown jewels with him to Buda; his successor on the Hungarian throne, Emperor Sigismund, rendered them to Poland in 1412. On two occasions, in mid-17th and early 18th centuries, they were evacuated across Poland's southern border to protect them from invading Swedish armies. In 1733, during the War of the Polish Succession, supporters of King Stanislaus I concealed the jewels in a Warsaw church for three years to prevent Augustus III from using them in his coronation. In 1764, they were sent to Warsaw again, to be used in a coronation for the last time – that of Stanislaus Augustus Poniatowski. They were returned to Kraków afterwards.

During a typical Polish coronation ceremony in the times of the Polish–Lithuanian Commonwealth, the king-elect received Szczerbiec after his anointment and before being crowned and enthroned. The primate of Poland, that is the archbishop of Gniezno, picked up the unsheathed sword from the altar and handed it to the kneeling king. At the same time, he recited a formula which asked the monarch to use the sword to rule justly, defend the Church, fight evil, protect widows and orphans, and to "rebuild what is damaged, maintain what is rebuilt, avenge what is unjust, reinforce what is well managed," etc. Then, the king handed the sword to the Crown sword-bearer (miecznik koronny), who slid it into the scabbard and passed on to the primate. The primate, aided by the Crown and Lithuanian sword-bearers, fastened the scabbard to the king's belt. The king stood up and, facing onlookers, withdrew Szczerbiec, made three times the sign of the cross with it, and wiped it against his left arm before replacing it in the scabbard. The king's sword-wielding abilities were closely watched by his new subjects during this part of the ritual. When Augustus III betrayed his poor fencing skills at his coronation, nobles joked that they were going to have "a peaceful lord". After Szczerbiec, a bishop handed the sovereign the Grunwald Swords symbolizing the monarch's reign over the two constituent nations of the Commonwealth.

Throughout the period from Casimir the Great (r. 1333–1370) to Stanislaus Augustus, Polish crown jewels were commonly believed to date back to the times of Boleslaus the Brave. This conviction helped maintain a sense of continuity of Polish statehood and provide legitimacy for the nation's kings, implicitly making each Polish monarch a successor of the ancient and glorious legacy of the first king of the House of Piast. Accordingly, the coronation sword took over the name and the legend of the original Szczerbiec. The corrosion-induced slit in the blade became associated with the fabled szczerba, or notch that Boleslaus had purportedly made on his sword in Kiev. The power of tradition was so strong that when Stanislaus Augustus's court painter, Marcello Bacciarelli, who had made detailed studies of Polish crown jewels, painted an imaginary portrait of Boleslaus the Brave, he chose to depict Szczerbiec so that its appearance agreed with legend rather than reality. The images of the coronation crown and sword are overall meticulously accurate, but Bacciarelli's Szczerbiec lacks the slit and has a chipped edge instead.

=== In foreign hands ===
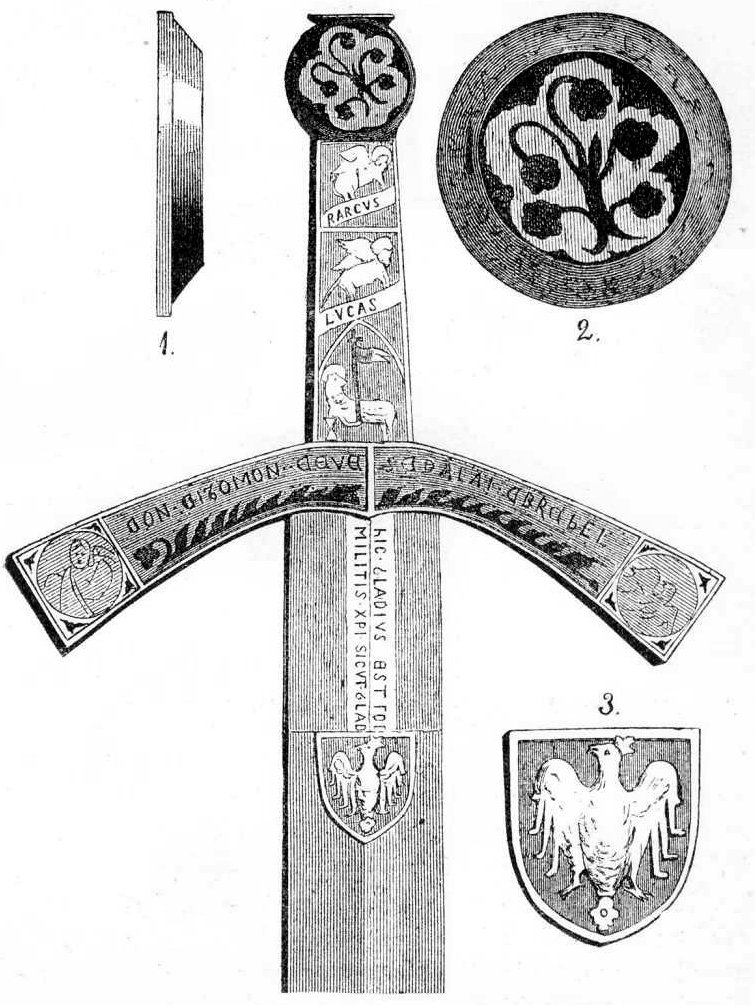
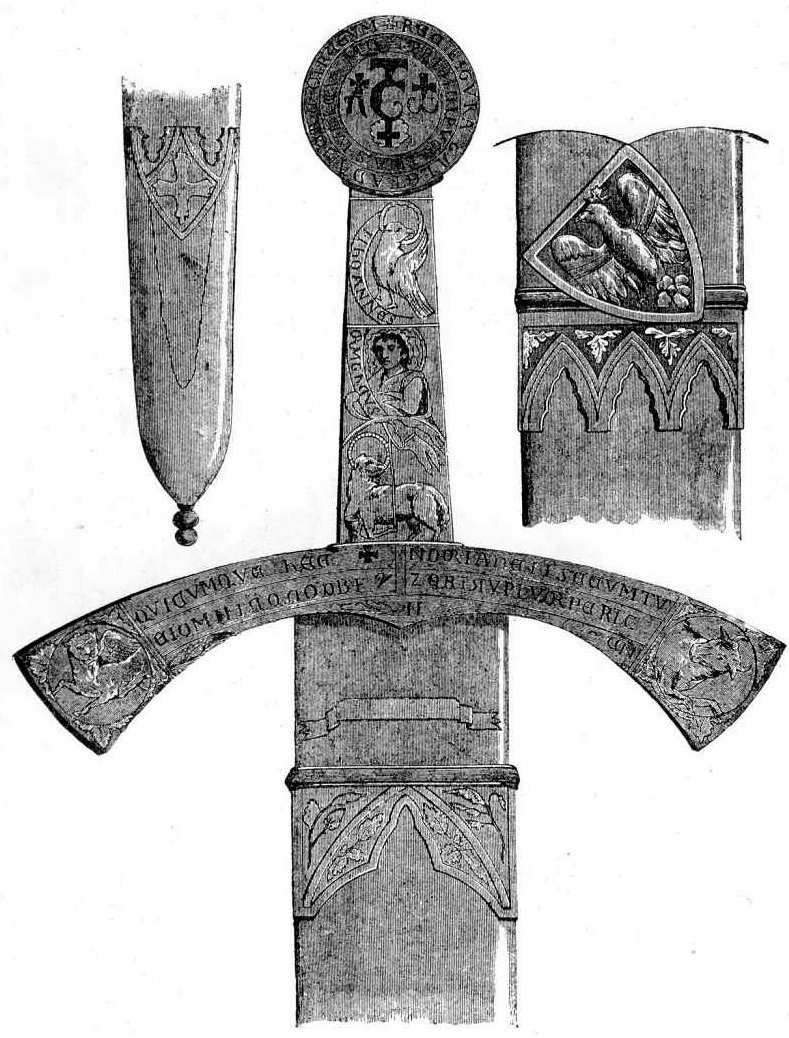
Rough sketches of the obverse (left, by S. Smolikowski) and reverse (by Sebastiano Ciampi) sides of the hilt

In 1794, during the failed Kościuszko Uprising which led to the final partition of Poland a year later, Prussian troops captured Kraków. In the following year, on King Frederick William II's orders, the treasure vault of the Wawel Castle was looted and the crown jewels taken to Breslau (now Wrocław in Poland), then to Berlin, and finally to Königsberg (now Kaliningrad in Russia). Between 1809 and 1811 most of the jewels were melted down, but some, including Szczerbiec, were put up for sale. The coronation sword was acquired by the future Russian minister of justice, Prince Dmitry Lobanov-Rostovsky, who probably hoped to resell it to one of Polish aristocrats. In 1819, he approached General Wincenty Krasiński, speaker of the Sejm (parliament) of the "Congress" Kingdom of Poland. The prince did not disclose the actual source of the sword and claimed to have bought it in Moscow from an Armenian merchant who had found the weapon somewhere between Belgrade and Rusçuk (now Ruse in Bulgaria) during the recent Russo-Turkish War. Krasiński, who was a known antique weapon collector, suspected it could be Szczerbiec, but asked Prof. Sebastiano Ciampi, a historian of the Warsaw University, for opinion. Ciampi examined the lithography Krasiński had had made of the sword, but was unsure whether it was the actual Szczerbiec. As a consequence, Krasiński declined Lobanov-Rostovsky's offer.

Lobanov-Rostovsky ultimately sold Szczerbiec to Prince Anatoly Demidov, who kept it together with the rest of the Demidov collection in his Villa San Donato near Florence. In 1870, the sword was bought for 20,000 French francs by Alexander Basilevsky, Russian ambassador to France and great art collector. In 1878, he displayed Szczerbiec at the World's Fair in Paris. By that time, the scabbard had been lost and the sword itself was presented as of Teutonic origin. It was seen by several Polish visitors who speculated whether it could be the Polish coronation sword. In 1884, the entire Basilevsky collection was purchased by Emperor Alexander III of Russia for the Hermitage Museum in Saint Petersburg. Both Polish and other experts at the time expressed doubts as to the authenticity of Szczerbiec held in Russia's largest museum (see Historical replicas below). An international museum congress held in Saint Petersburg in 1913 pronounced the sword a 17th-century replica.

In 1917, as a result of the October Revolution, Russia became a communist state. In the aftermath of World War I, Poland reemerged as an independent country in the following year. From 1919 to 1921, the two states fought the Polish–Soviet War which was concluded with the Peace of Riga. Article 11 of the peace treaty required that the Soviet side return all culturally significant collections and items that had been removed from Poland since the First Partition in 1772. A special bilateral committee was set up to carry out the restitution of cultural goods. In 1928, the committee's efforts resulted in the return to Poland of, among other national treasures, Szczerbiec, which, after 133 years, was deposited back in the Wawel Castle.

=== Evacuation in World War II ===
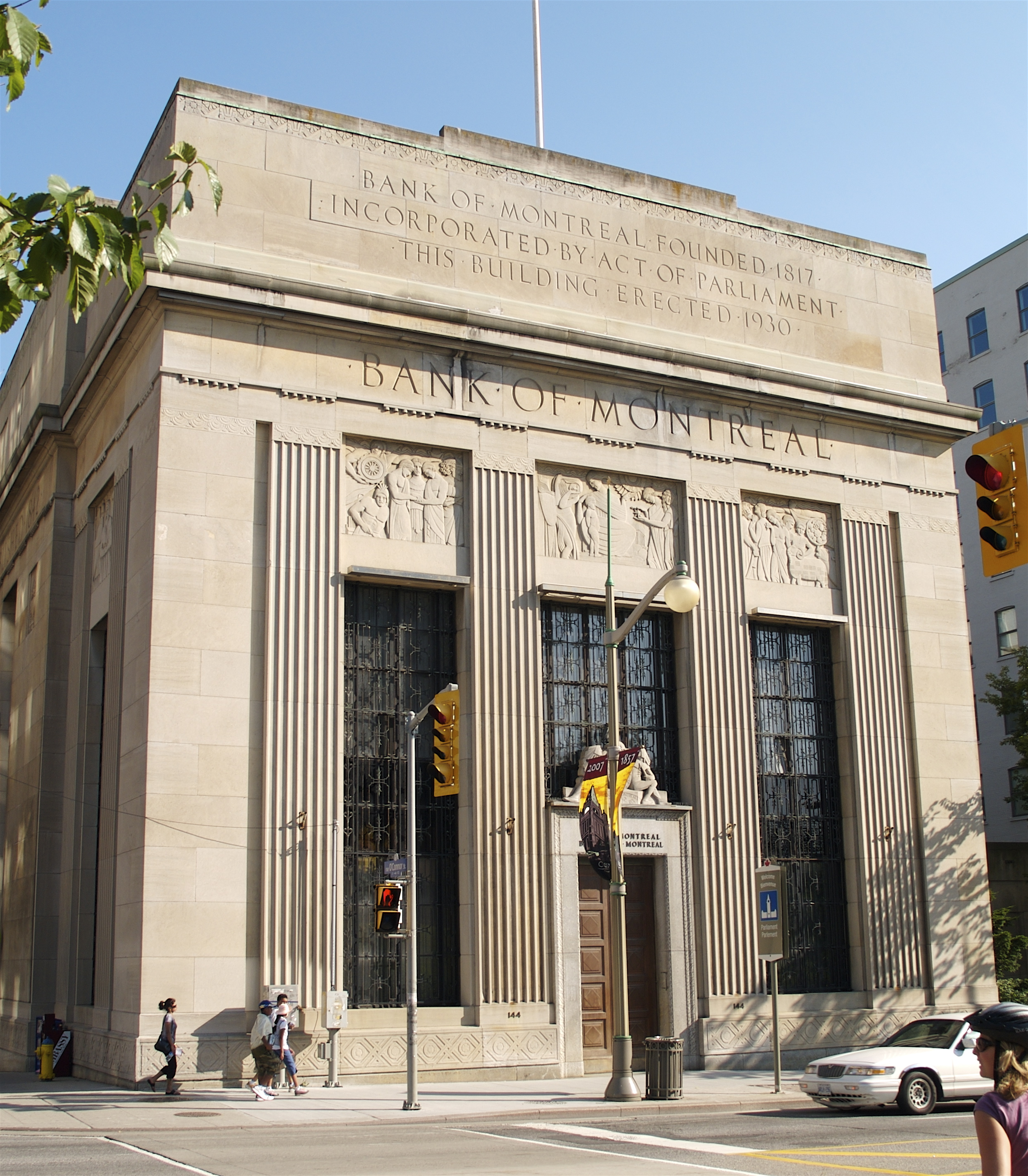
From 1945 to 1959, Szczerbiec was locked away in a vault of the Bank of Montreal branch at 144 Wellington Street, Ottawa.

On 3 September 1939, two days after Germany invaded Poland triggering the Second World War, began the evacuation of the most precious national treasures, including Szczerbiec, from the Wawel Castle. The cargo was transported on barges, wagons, buses and trucks to Romania. From there, it was shipped by sea to France and later to Britain. On the way from Bordeaux to Falmouth, the ship carrying Polish national treasures came under fire from the Luftwaffe. Karol Estreicher, who oversaw the evacuation, decided then to remove Szczerbiec from a chest and sandwich it between two wooden planks, and to attach to them an explanatory message in a bottle – so that in the event that the ship was sunk, at least the coronation sword could be salvaged. When the German bombing of Britain began in July 1940, the valuables were transported aboard the Polish ocean liner MS Batory to Canada and finally deposited at the Polish consulate and then other locations in Ottawa. After the war, one of the custodians of the national treasures, who remained loyal to the London-based Polish government-in-exile, was reluctant to return them to Poland, which had fallen under communist rule and Soviet influence. After lengthy negotiations, the first batch of the most important objects, including Szczerbiec, was ultimately returned in 1959; the rest followed in 1961. Since then, the Polish coronation sword has been on permanent display in the treasure vault of the Wawel Castle.

== Historical replicas ==
A treasury inventory of the Radziwiłł family's Nieśwież Castle (now Nesvizh in Belarus) made in 1740 includes a detailed description of a sword decorated with symbols of the Evangelists and inscriptions identical to those on Szczerbiec. According to the inventory, it was a gift from Crown Prince Jakub Sobieski to Prince Michał Radziwiłł, but the original source of the supposed replica was not given. An inventory made in 1738 of the treasure vault of the Sobieski family's Żółkiew Castle (now Zhovkva in Ukraine) mentions "an estoc (koncerz) covered with golden plates bearing images of the Four Evangelists; Skanderbek's." Based on this record, historian Aleksander Czołowski hypothesized that a replica of Szczerbiec was forged as early as 1457 and awarded to George Kastrioti Skanderbeg, the national leader of Albania, in recognition of his victory over the Ottoman forces (see Battle of Ujëbardha). After King John III Sobieski defeated the Ottomans in the Battle of Vienna in 1683, Albanians presumably returned the sword to him. His son, Jakub, possibly passed it on to Michał Radziwiłł as a present.

There are doubts, however, whether the swords known to have been at Żółkiew in 1738 and at Nieśwież two years later, were in fact the same sword. The Radziwiłłs' castle was plundered by the Russian army in 1812 and the subsequent fate of their replica of Szczerbiec is unknown. This fact cast doubts over the authenticity of Szczerbiec held in the Hermitage. Some experts suspected that the sword possessed by the Russian imperial museum was in fact the Nieśwież replica, not part of the original royal insignia.

Another historically notable replica of Szczerbiec was produced probably in Dresden, Saxony, at the time when the original was in Prussian hands. It is modest and inexact; the handle is carved in bovine bone and the niello is imitated with black paint. Designs on the handle are patterned on those of the genuine Szczerbiec, except that the crosses and letters on the pommel were replaced with the coat of arms of the Polish–Lithuanian Commonwealth. The blade was initially shorter than that of the original, actually typical for a stiletto. It was purchased in Dresden by art historian Edward Rastawiecki, who in 1869 donated it to the archeological collection of the Jagiellonian University of Kraków. The university lost it during the German occupation in World War II. After the war, the replica found itself in the hands of Tadeusz Janowski who smuggled it to the United States in 1947. At around that time, the short stiletto blade was replaced with a long blade of a 16th-century German sword. To imitate Szczerbiec, a slit was cut in the blade and small heraldic shields were attached to it on both sides. During the communist rule in Poland, the Polish American community of Chicago treated the replica as a symbol of Poland's independence. In 1968, it was demonstrated to U.S. Senator Robert F. Kennedy while he was meeting with Polish Americans during his presidential campaign. Janowski returned the sword to the Jagiellonian University in 2003.

== Modern symbolism ==
National Party (Poland) emblem.

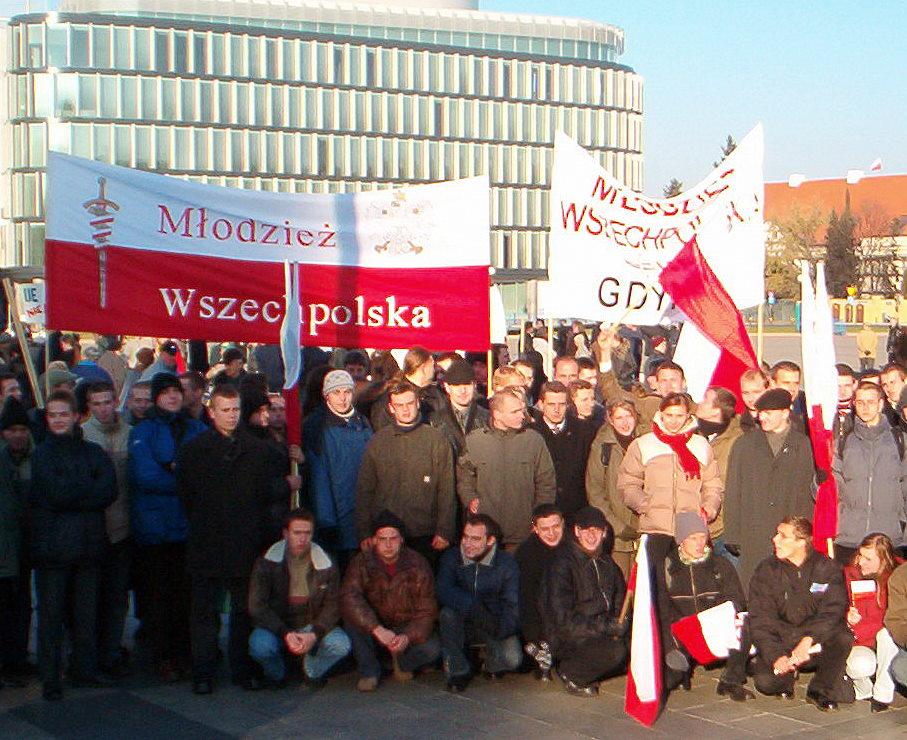
A demonstration of the All-Polish Youth in 2003. The Mieczyk Chrobrego symbol is visible on a banner on the left-hand side.

In the interwar period, a simplified image of Szczerbiec wrapped three times in a white-and-red ribbon was adopted as a symbol of Polish nationalist organizations led by Roman Dmowski – the Camp of Great Poland (Obóz Wielkiej Polski), the National Party (Stronnictwo Narodowe), and the All-Polish Youth (Młodzież Wszechpolska). Their members wore it as a badge called Mieczyk Chrobrego, or "Little Sword of [Boleslaus] the Brave". The symbol was also sewn onto the left sleeve of the sand shirt which was part of the Camp of Great Poland uniform. Among the politicians who wore the badge before World War II were Roman Dmowski, Władysław Grabski, Wojciech Korfanty, Roman Rybarski, and Wojciech Jaruzelski. It was banned in 1938 during the "Sanation" period. During World War II, the badge was used by right-wing anti-Nazi and anti-Soviet military resistance groups, the National Armed Forces (Narodowe Siły Zbrojne) and the National Military Organization (Narodowa Organizacja Wojskowa). After the fall of communism in Poland, the Mieczyk Chrobrego symbol was readopted by new or reactivated nationalist and far-right organizations, including League of Polish Families (Liga Polskich Rodzin), All-Polish Youth and the Camp of Great Poland. Additionally, Szczerbiec is the title of a periodical published since 1991 by a minor radical nationalist party, the National Revival of Poland (Narodowe Odrodzenie Polski).

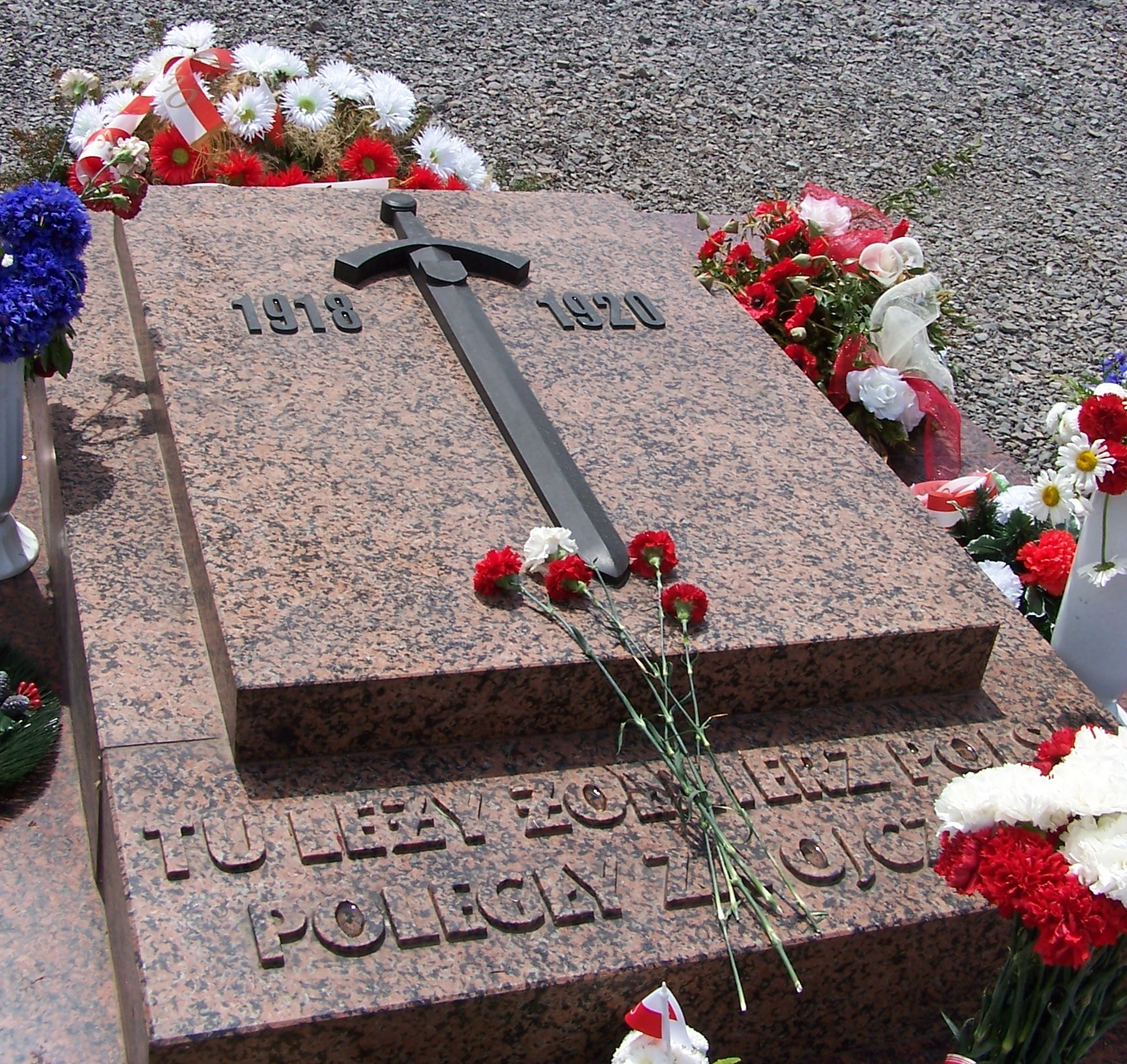
A likeness of Szczerbiec sculpted at the Polish Eaglets' Cemetery in Lviv, Ukraine. The inscription reads, "Here lies a Polish soldier fallen for the Fatherland."

In 2005, the Polish Football Association, in an attempt to fight racism among Polish football fans, prepared a blacklist of most common racist and fascist symbols to be banned from Polish football stadiums. The catalog, co-authored by independent anti-fascist organization Never Again (Nigdy Więcej), listed the Mieczyk Chrobrego as one of the extreme right symbols that are often displayed at the Polish stadiums. The catalog listed other racist and fascist symbols like the Nazi swastika, the Celtic cross, and the Confederate Flag. After a protest by MEP Sylwester Chruszcz of the League of Polish Families, additional consultations were held with historians, academic researchers and other experts and as a result the symbol is still listed in the catalog of extreme-right symbols banned at Polish football stadiums. It was also banned by UEFA during Euro 2008 and 2012.

The symbolic use of Szczerbiec became a bone of contention again in 2009. After a monument to the Ukrainian Insurgent Army (Ukrayins'ka Povstans'ka Armiya) on the Chryszczata Mountain in southeastern Poland was vandalized, authorities of the Ukrainian city of Lviv demanded the removal of an image of Szczerbiec from the local Polish military cemetery. The Ukrainians, recalling the legendary use of the original sword in a Polish invasion of Kiev, argued it was a Polish nationalist, militaristic and anti-Ukrainian symbol.

== Sources ==
- Biborski, Marcin; Stępiński, Janusz; Żabiński, Grzegorz (2011), "Szczerbiec (the Jagged Sword) – the Coronation Sword of the Kings of Poland", Gladius, 31 (XXXI), Madrid Departamento de Publicaciones del CSIC: 93–148, doi:10.3989/gladius.2011.0006, ISSN 0436-029X
- Chruszcz, Sylwester (20 June 2007), Chruszcz broni mieczyka Chrobrego [Chruszcz defends Boleslaus the Brave's sword] (in Polish), Endecja.pl, archived from the original on 9 March 2012
- Chruszcz: Umieszczenie "szczerbca" w wykazie symboli zakazanych niedopuszczalne [Chruszcz: Blacklisting Szczerbiec unacceptable] (in Polish), Serwis internetowy Ligi Polskich Rodzin, archived from the original on 4 March 2012
- Czyżewski, Krzysztof. "Military Objects". Wawel Royal Castle. Państowe Zbiory Sztuki na Wawelu.
- Dobrowolski, Rafał, "Szczerbiec", Leksykon (in Polish), Endecja.pl, archived from the original on 19 February 2012
- Jaruzelski, Wojciech (2 March 2009). "Ja też nosiłem mieczyk Chrobrego – rozmowa z gen. Wojciechem Jaruzelskim" [I also wore Boleslaus the Brave's sword – interview with Gen. Wojciech Jaruzelski]. Bibuła (Interview) (in Polish). Interviewed by Jan Engelgard; Adam Wielomski.
- Lileyko, Jerzy (1987), Regalia polskie [Polish Regalia] (in Polish), Warszawa: Krajowa Agencja Wydawnicza, ISBN 83-03-02021-8
- "Lwów: Polski symbol na Cmentarzu Orląt zostanie usunięty?" [Lviv: Polish symbol at the Eaglets' Cemetery to be removed?], Wiadomości24 (in Polish), 23 June 2009
- Materiał szkoleniowy dotyczący walki z rasizmem, ksenofobią i innymi działaniami mającymi znamiona dyskryminacji – "Wykopmy rasizm ze stadionów" [Training materials for combating racism, xenophobia, and other discriminatory practices – "Let's kick racism out of stadiums"] (in Polish), Kolegium Sędziów Chrzanów, 19 April 2007, archived from the original (doc) on 1 March 2012
- "Mizhnarodnyi skandal: u Lvovi mozhut demontuvaty polskyi mech-shcherbets" Міжнародний скандал: у Львові можуть демонтувати польський меч-щербець [International scandal: the Polish Szczerbiec sword may be removed in Lviv], Zaxid.net (in Ukrainian), 23 June 2009
- Prinke, Rafal T. (1983), "The Jagged Sword and Polish Rosicrucians", Journal of Rosicrucian Studies, 1: 8–13
- "Reaktywacja pisma Szczerbiec – "Faszyzm wraca na salony"" [Reactivation of the Szczerbiec magazine – "Fascism returns to the salons"], Narodowe Odrodzenie Polski (in Polish), 14 July 2009
- Respect Diversity – Football Unites: The FARE Network's Programme of Activities at Euro 2012 (PDF), FARE Network
- Rożek, Michał (1987), Polskie koronacje i korony [Polish Coronations and Crowns] (in Polish), Kraków: Krajowa Agencja Wydawnicza, ISBN 83-03-01913-9
- Swoger, Gordon (2004), The Strange Odyssey of Poland's National Treasures, 1939–1961: A Polish-Canadian Story, Toronto: Dundurn Press, ISBN 1-55002-515-5
- Szablowski, Jerzy (1969), Zbiory Zamku Królewskiego na Wawelu [Collections of the Royal Wawel Castle] (in Polish), Warszawa: Arkady
- Uhlig, Dominik (26 June 2007), "Czy "mieczyk Chrobrego" wpuszczą na stadiony?" [Will they allow Boleslaus the Brave's sword in stadiums?], Gazeta Wyborcza (in Polish), archived from the original on 16 March 2012
- Waltoś, Stanisław (2003). "Pamiątka sentymentalna" [A sentimental relic]. Alma Mater (Interview) (in Polish). Interviewed by Rita Pagacz-Moczarska. Jagiellonian University. Archived from the original on 27 September 2011.
- Wójcik, Karol (1997), "Rewindykacja zbiorów i zabytków (po Traktacie Ryskim)" [Revindication of collections and monuments after the Treaty of Riga], The Scrolls (in Polish), 4, ISSN 1496-6115, archived from the original on 2 April 2023
- Wykopmy rasizm ze stadionów [Let's kick racism out of stadiums] (in Polish), Stowarzyszenie Nigdy Więcej
- Wytyczne dla Delegatów Meczowych PZPN [Guidelines for Polish Football Association Match Delegates] (PDF) (in Polish), Polski Związek Piłki Nożnej
- Żygulski, Zdzisław, jun. (2003), "Stara kopia Szczerbca" [An old replica of Szczerbiec], Alma Mater (in Polish), Jagiellonian University, archived from the original on 27 September 2011
