= Crown of Augustus II the Strong =

Crown of Augustus II

Details
- Country: Poland
- Made: 1697
- Material: Silver-gilt

The Crown of Augustus II was intended for his coronation as a King of Poland. The crown was made in 1697 by Freiburg's goldsmith Johann Friedrich Klemm. It was not used, however. The Augustus II's crown is kept in Dresden Armory (Rüstkammer) in Dresden, Germany.

== History ==
Due to a double election of François Louis, Prince of Conti and the Frederick Augustus I, Elector of Saxony (elected King of Poland as Augustus II) in 1697, the two claimants to the Polish throne had serious troubles with obtaining approval of the nobility for their coronation. The most difficult situation was of Elector of Saxony, who had no support of the primate Michał Stefan Radziejowski and most of the senators holding the custody of the Wawel Castle Crown Treasury. Therefore, expecting obstacles in obtaining the royal insignia, he ordered to prepare replacements before his arrival to Kraków. On the eve of the ceremony, some of the gathered decided to find a way to obtain the original regalia. Two monks Aleksander Wyhowski, prior of Czerwińsk and Mikołaj Wyżycki, prior of the Holy Cross made a hole in the castle's wall and got to the vault from which they stole the crown, scepter, sword and orb. The Dresden regalia become unnecessary, Augustus II the Strong, however, treated them as a private insignia.

Crown of Augustus II the Strong is made of gilded silver and decorated with colorful enamel and semi-precious stones.
