= Swedish Crown (Polish crown jewel) =

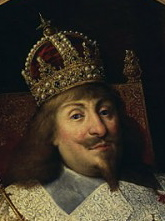
Portrait of King Władysław IV Vasa in coronation robes (detail), wearing the "Swedish Crown"

The Swedish Crown (Polish: Korona szwedzka), also known as the Purchased Crown (Polish: Zakupiona Korona), was a part of the Polish crown jewels.

== History ==
The crown was made for King Sigismund II Augustus. After Sigismund's death, it was pawned to Giovanni Tudesco and later ransomed by King Sigismund III Vasa for 20,000 florins and used for his coronation in Uppsala as King of Sweden on 19 February 1594.

In 1623, King Sigismund III bequeathed it to the Polish–Lithuanian Commonwealth, and it was included in the State Treasury at the Wawel Castle after his death in 1633.

The appearance of the crown was a type of corona clausa, consisting of five larger and five smaller parts (portiones maiores quinque, minores quinque) and 262 precious stones, including 24 emeralds, 64 rubies, 30 sapphires, 21 diamonds and 123 pearls. In the 18th century, the crown was depicted in the portrait of Sigismund I the Old by Marcello Bacciarelli, painted to embellish the Marble Room at the Royal Castle in Warsaw.
