= Muscovy Crown =

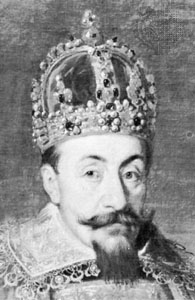
Portrait of King Sigismund III Vasa in coronation robes (detail), wearing the "Muscovy Crown", circa 1626

The so-called Muscovy Crown (Polish: Korona moskiewska) was a part of the Polish Crown Jewels. It was made in about 1610 in anticipation of Prince Władysław Vasa's coronation as Tsar of Russia, which was also known as Muscovy. Due to his father's opposition and a popular uprising in Russia, he never actually took the Russian throne, despite being elected by the Seven Boyars. Nevertheless, until 1634 he used the title of Grand Duke of Muscovy.

== History ==
The Muscovy Crown was the type of corona clausa, made in the form of the rims covered with the globe and a cross on their intersection. It was decorated with precious stones including sapphires, emeralds, rubies and pearls. In total there were 255 precious stones. The crown was bequeathed by King Władysław IV Vasa to the Polish–Lithuanian Commonwealth, however, after the king's death in 1648, it was appropriated by King John II Casimir and bequeathed to the State Treasury in 1668. It was pawned lawlessly in 1700 by King Augustus II the Strong, and later appropriated by Frederick I of Prussia (part of so-called Pawn of the Rzeczpospolita) as a result of German claiming to the outlays sustained during the Deluge (the popular name for the Swedish invasion of Poland during the reign of King John II Casimir).

One of the gems from the crown became the property of Jan Kazimierz Krasiński, Grand Treasurer of the Crown. It was in the possession of the Krasiński family till the 19th century. Later it was given to Tsar Nicholas I of Russia by Wincenty Krasiński and found its place in the collections of the Kremlin Armoury in Moscow.
