= Crown of Bolesław I the Brave =

Part of the Crown Jewels of Poland

Crown of Bolesław I the Brave Corona Privilegiata
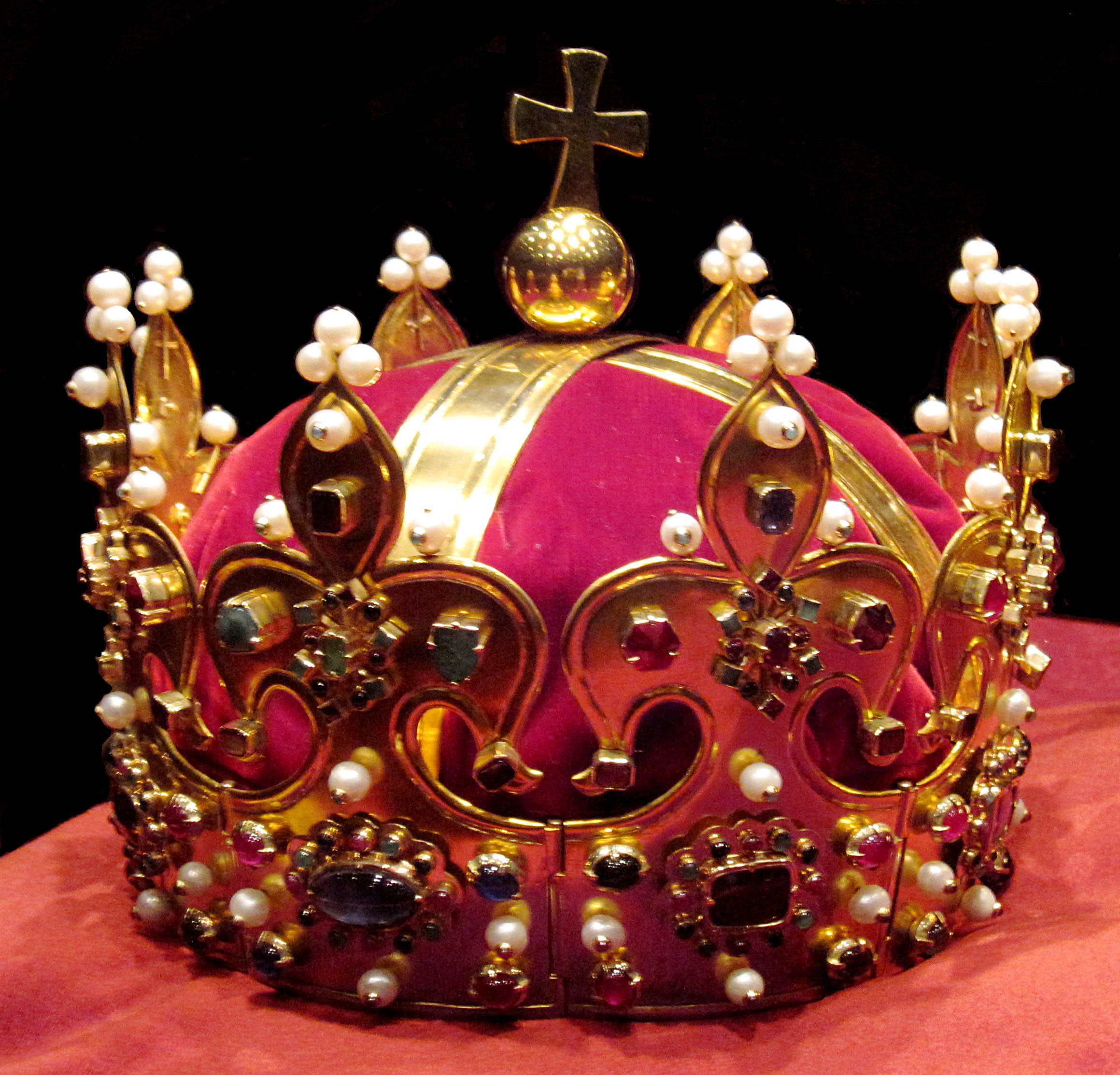
- Replica of the crown from 2003

Heraldic depictions

Details
- Country: Poland
- Made: 1320 (original), 2003 (replica)
- Destroyed: 1811 (original)
- Weight: 1.28 kg (2.8 lb) (replica)
- Arches: 2
- Material: Gold, silver (replica)
- Cap: Crimson-purple velvet
- Notable stones: Rubies, garnets, emeralds, sapphires and pearls
- Predecessors: Crown of Bolesław II the Bold

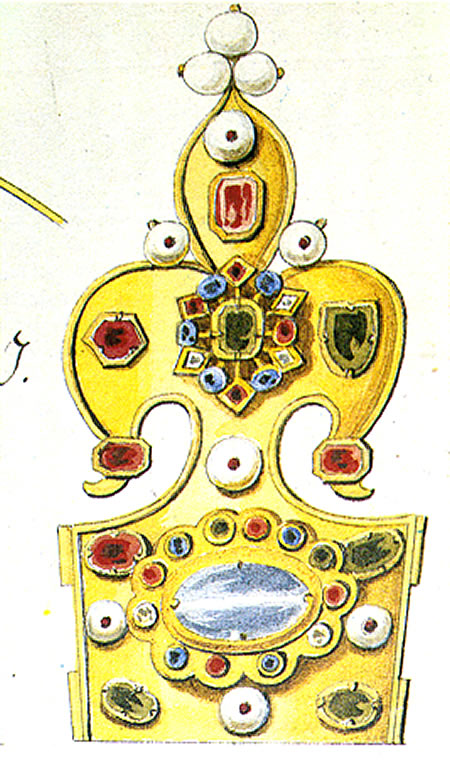
Detailed drawing by Krzysztof Józef Werner of a part of the crown before 1794. The drawing was used for the reconstruction in 2001-2003

The Crown of Bolesław the Brave (Polish: korona Chrobrego), also known as the Corona Privilegiata (the privileged crown), was the principal coronation crown of the kings of Poland from the fourteenth to the eighteenth century. It was made for the coronation of Władysław I Łokietek on 20 January 1320 and became the most important of the Polish royal regalia.

Although traditionally associated with Bolesław I the Brave, Poland's first crowned king, the crown did not date from his reign. Its identification with the regalia of the first Polish monarchy reflected the belief in the historical continuity of the Kingdom of Poland. The crown was regarded as a material symbol of royal authority and the enduring dignity of the Polish Crown, independent of individual monarchs or ruling dynasties.

Made of gold and decorated with gemstones and pearls, the crown consisted of interconnected segments surmounted by fleurs-de-lis. Originally probably an open crown, it was later transformed into a closed crown with two arches surmounted by an orb and cross. Its appearance is known from historical inventories and eighteenth-century representations, although the accuracy of its modern reconstructions remains disputed.

The crown was last used at the coronation of Stanisław August Poniatowski in Warsaw in 1764. In 1795, it was seized by Prussian troops from the Crown Treasury at Wawel Castle. It was subsequently dismantled and melted down in 1811, together with other Polish royal regalia.

== History ==
=== Earlier coronation crowns ===
The crown used for the coronation of Władysław I Łokietek in 1320 was not the first Polish coronation crown. The earliest Polishregalia, used for the coronations of Bolesław I the Brave and Mieszko II Lambert in 1025, were lost following the political crisis of 1031, when they were handed over to Emperor Conrad II. They were taken to Germany, either by Queen Richeza or by Duke Bezprym, and never returned to Poland.

A new set of regalia was created for the coronation of Bolesław II the Bold in 1076. Little is known about the crown's appearance. According to Oswald Balzer it was made of gold and adorned with four fleurs-de-lis evenly spaced around its circlet. The treasury also contained two auxiliary silver crowns and a replica of the Holy Lance, the only royal insignia to have survived from the reign of Bolesław I the Brave. Although no Polish ruler was crowned king for more than two centuries, the regalia preserved in the cathedral treasury in Kraków remained a symbol of the continuity of the Polish Kingdom and Kraków's status as its capital. The Life of Saint Stanislaus, written around 1260, states that the insignia kept in the cathedral treasury—the crown, sceptre, and lance—had been presented to Bolesław the Brave by Emperor Otto III. This account reflects the belief, already prevalent at the time, that the royal regalia had been preserved continuously since the earliest days of the Polish monarchy.

This crown is believed to have been used again at the coronations of Przemysł II in 1295 and Wenceslaus II in 1300. Subsequently taken to Bohemia, it disappeared in the early 14th century, necessitating the creation of new coronation insignia for Władysław I.

=== Coronation crown of 1320 ===
A new set of regalia was prepared for the coronation of Władysław I in 1320 and survived until the 18th century. A legend soon emerged linking the new regalia to Bolesław I the Brave. In the mid-15th century, Jan Długosz stated in his chronicle that the crown placed on Władysław I's head during his coronation, along with the orb and sceptre presented to him, had been brought to Kraków from Gniezno. Describing the homage paid by the Duke of Prussia in 1525 to Sigismund I the Old, who appeared in full coronation regalia, Wawrzyniec Międzyleski explicitly stated that the king wore the crown that Bolesław the Brave had received from Emperor Otto III. The regalia used at Władysław I Łokietek's coronation also included a ceremonial sword, Szczerbiec, which was likewise associated with Bolesław the Brave.

The crown along with the crown jewels was kept in the treasury of Wawel Cathedral. During the reign of the Jagiellon dynasty it was moved to the Crown Treasury of the castle. The crown was periodically taken away from Wawel, notably in 1370, when Louis I of Hungary had the Polish regalia transported to Hungary. They were not returned until 1412. During the seventeenth century, the crown was also brought to Warsaw on several occasions for the coronations of Polish queens consort.

During the Swedish invasion of Poland (1655–1660), the crown was taken to Stará Ľubovňa Castle, in present-day Slovakia, for safekeeping. In the early eighteenth century, it was moved again, including to Silesia and Moravia. It was returned to Wawel in 1730 but taken to Warsaw three years later. In 1734, the crown was deposited at the Jasna Góra Monastery, where it remained until 1736. For the coronation of Stanisław August Poniatowski on 25 November 1764, the crown was transported from Kraków to St. John's Cathedral in Warsaw for the last time. It was subsequently returned to Wawel Castle, where it remained until its theft in 1795.

Prussian troops occupied Kraków in June 1794. On the night of 3–4 October 1795, they broke into the Crown Treasury at Wawel Castle and seized the Polish royal regalia, which were subsequently transported to Silesia and then to Berlin. In 1809, King Frederick William III of Prussia ordered their destruction. The crowns and other precious-metal objects were dismantled and melted down in Königsberg in 1811, while their gemstones were sold. The recovered gold and silver were used for coinage.

=== Reconstruction ===
Between 2001 and 2003, a team of craftsmen led by Adam Orzechowski of Nowy Sącz produced a replica of the crown using surviving historical drawings, paintings and written descriptions. The reconstruction also incorporated gold obtained from Prussian coins believed to have been minted from the melted-down Polish regalia.

The replica was made using approximately 600 grams each of gold and silver and decorated with synthetic rubies, emeralds, sapphires, garnets and pearls. Its design was based primarily on eighteenth-century representations of the original crown.
