= Coronation crown =

Crown used by a monarch when being crowned

A coronation crown is a crown used by a monarch when being crowned. In some monarchies, monarchs have or had a number of crowns for different occasions, such as a coronation crown for the moment of coronation and a state crown for general usage in state ceremonial.

== List of crowns ==
Name	Date of manufacture	Image	Comment
Imperial Crown of the Holy Roman Empire	960 – 1027		The coronation crown of the Holy Roman Emperors. It was made in the late 10th or early 11th century. Unlike many other crowns, it has an octagonal rather than a circular shape, and is constructed from eight hinged plates.
St Edward's Crown	1661		The traditional English then British coronation crown since the 13th century. The original crown was a holy relic kept at Westminster Abbey, St Edward's burial place, until the regalia were either sold or melted down when Parliament abolished the monarchy in 1649, during the English Civil War. The current St Edward's Crown was made for Charles II in 1661. It is only used at coronations of the monarch and not worn on any other occasion. It has been used at a number of coronations since the restoration of the monarchy in 1660, but not, in fact the majority. The monarchs crowned with St. Edward's Crown were Charles II (1661), James II (1685), William III (1689), George V (1911), George VI (1937) Elizabeth II (1953) and Charles III (2023). King Edward VII intended to be crowned with St. Edward's Crown but in the event used instead the lighter Imperial State Crown (St Edward's Crown being judged too heavy for the King to wear soon after his illness).
Crown of Scotland	1540		The traditional Scottish coronation crown. It was made, or at least remodelled, for King James V in 1540. The other monarchs crowned with it were Mary Queen of Scots (1543), James VI and I (1567), Charles I (1633) and finally Charles II (1651).
Crown of Charlemagne	840		The coronation crown of Kings of France up to and including King Louis XVI. It was destroyed during the French Revolution.
Crown of Christian V	1671		The coronation crown of the Danish absolute monarchs. It was made by German jeweller Paul Kurtz and used to crown Danish monarchs from King Christian V to King Christian VIII. After the end of absolute monarchy in Denmark in 1849, the crown ceased to be used in this way.
Crown of Norway	1818		The coronation crown of Norway. It was made in 1818 for the coronation of King Carl III Johan, who was king of both Sweden and Norway. The other monarchs crowned with it were Carl IV (1860), Oscar II (1873), and Haakon VII (1906). The late King Harald V had the crown presented to him in 1991, but it was not actually placed on his head.
Crown of Erik XIV	1561		The traditional Swedish coronation crown. It was made by Flemish goldsmith Cornelius ver Welden and used to crown Swedish monarchs from King Erik XIV to King Oscar II.
Holy Crown of Hungary	1000		No Hungarian king was ever regarded as being truly legitimate without first being crowned with it. The crown was a gift from Pope Sylvester II and was used to crown St. Stephen I, the first Christian king of Hungary, in 1000 or 1001. It is featured on Hungary's coat of arms.
Crown of Saint Wenceslas	1347		The coronation crown of the Kingdom of Bohemia since 1347.
Crown of Bolesław I the Brave	1000 / 1320		The traditional coronation crown of the Polish monarchs. According to legend Bolesław I the Brave received it from Otto III, Holy Roman Emperor. The original crown was lost in the course of history. It was only in 1320 that a new set of regalia was prepared for the coronation of King Władysław I the Elbow-high and survived as long as until the 18th century.
Great Imperial Crown of Russia	1762		The Great Imperial Crown of Russia, designed by Jérémie Pauzié in 1762 for the coronation of Catherine the Great. Inspired by the Byzantine Empire design, the crown was constructed of two gold and silver hemispheres, representing the eastern and western Roman empires, divided by a foliate garland and fastened with a low hoop. The crown contains 75 pearls and 4,936 Indian diamonds forming laurel and oak leaves, the symbols of power and strength, and is surmounted by a 398.62 carat ruby spinel and a diamond cross. The crown was produced in a record two months and weighted only 2.3 kg. From 1762, the crown created by Jérémie Pauzié was the coronation crown of all Romanov emperors, till the monarchy's abolition and the murder of the last Romanov tsar, Nicholas II in 1918. It is considered to be one of the main treasures of the Romanov dynasty, and is now on display in the Moscow Kremlin Armoury Museum in Russia.
Steel Crown of Romania	1881		Made in 1881 for the coronation of King Carol I of Romania. The king chose steel instead of gold to symbolise the bravery of his army during the Romanian War of Independence. The other monarchs crowned with it were Ferdinand I (1922) and Michael I (1940). Carol II never wore it because of his relationship with Magda Lupescu.
Karađorđević Crown	1904		Made by the French jewellery company Falaise in 1904 for the coronation of King Peter I of Serbia (and later Yugoslavia). Peter himself was the only king to actually wear the crown. Alexander I never wore it, and Peter II had it presented to him at his inauguration in 1941, but it was not actually placed on his head.
Kiani Crown	1796		The traditional coronation crown of Iran (Persia), created in 1796 for the Qajar dynasty. It was used to crown all Qajar shahs from Fat′h-Ali Shah to Ahmad Shah.
Pahlavi Crown	1926		Created in 1926 for the coronation of Reza Shah of Iran, to replace the earlier Kiani Crown. Also used at the coronation of Mohammad Reza Shah in 1967.
Great Crown of Victory	1785		Created in 1785 for the second coronation of King Rama I of Siam. The crown is used during the ceremony of the coronation of the Thai monarch and not worn on any other occasion. During the coronation the king puts the crown onto his own head. The crown is made of gold and weighs over 16 lb (7.3 kg). On other state occasions the kings can wear the Kathina Crown, which is a lighter alternative.

== See also ==
- Circlet
- Consort crown
- Imperial crown
- Royal crown
- State crown
