= Regalia of the Russian tsars =

Insignia of tsars and emperors of Russia

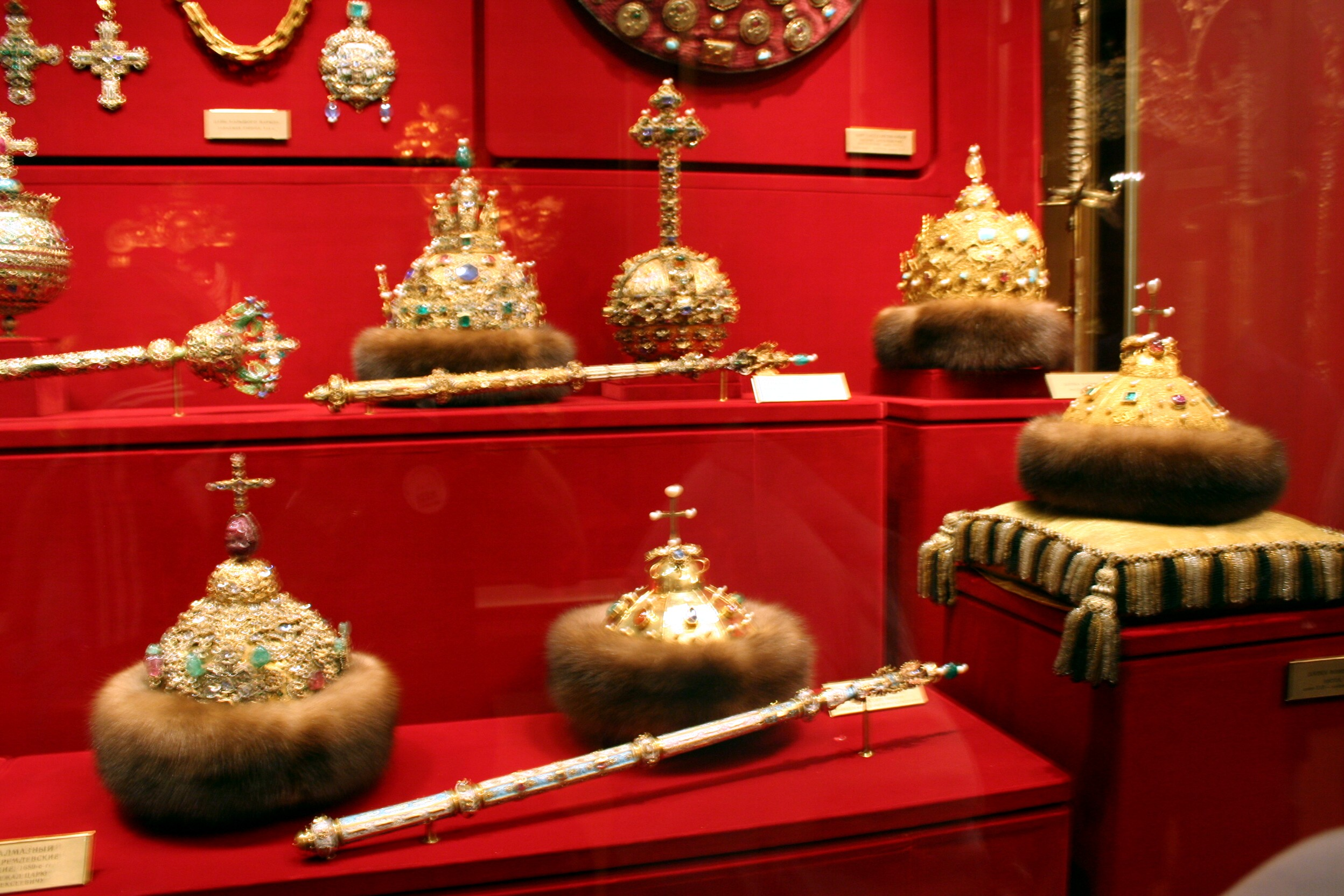
Russian historical regalia in Kremlin, part of showcase.

Regalia of the Russian tsars are the insignia of tsars and emperors of Russia, who ruled from the 13th to the 19th century. Over the centuries, the specific items used by Tsars changed greatly; the largest such shift occurred in the 18th century, when Peter the Great reformed the state to align it more closely with Western European monarchies.

After the Russian Revolution, the Bolsheviks sold the majority of the Romanovs' regalia, but the most important items, including the key coronation regalia, were placed in the Kremlin Armoury. Since 1967, they have been available for public viewing through the Diamond Fund permanent exposition.

== Oldest Russian regalia ==
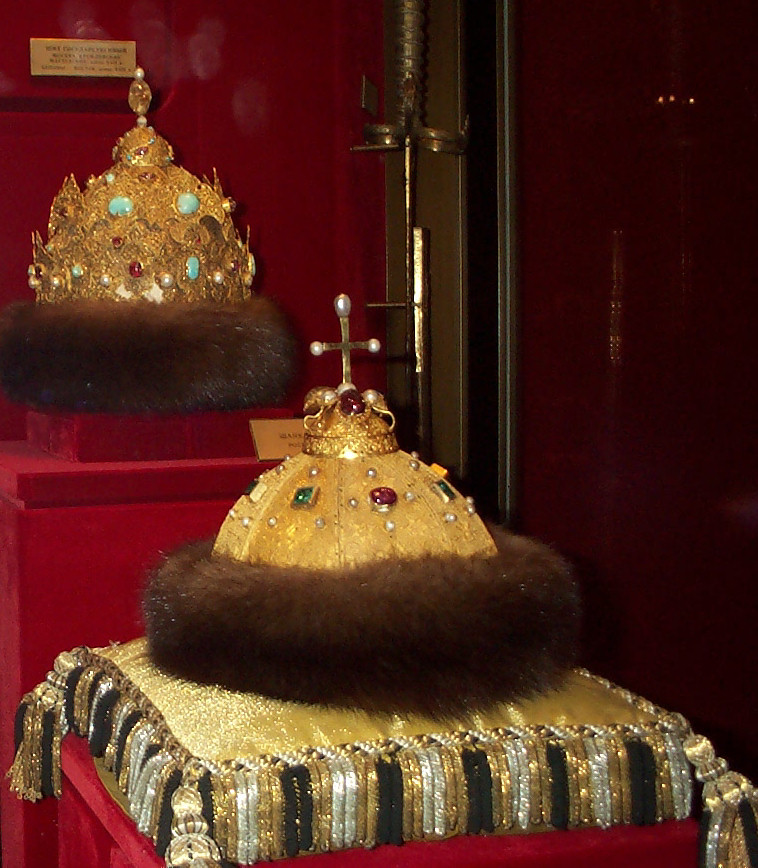
Two oldest Russian crowns - "Cap of Monomakh" and Kazan Crown.

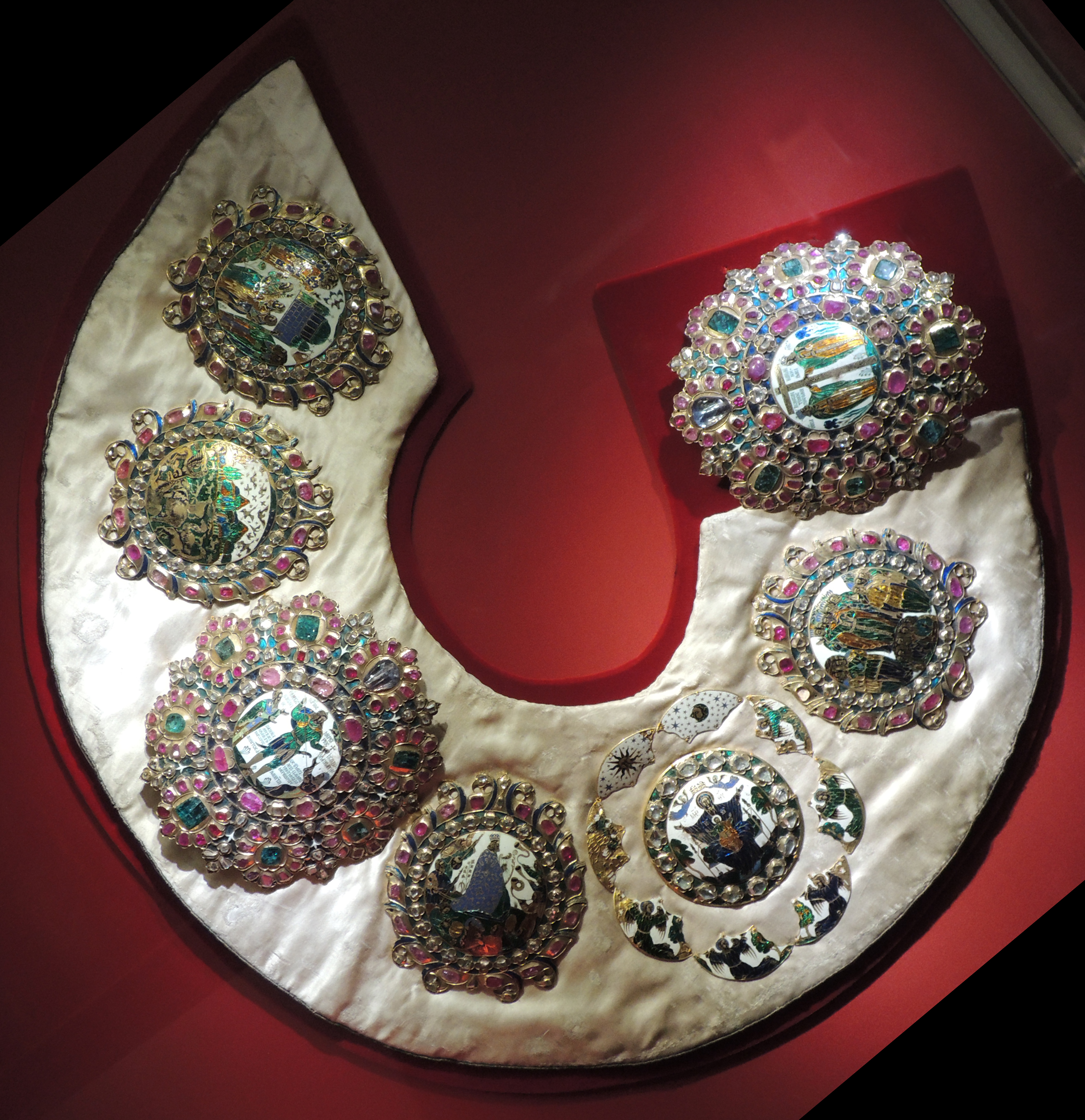
The barmas of tsar Alexey Mikhailovich

From the 13th to the end of the 14th century, the main insignia of knyaz power were the decorated barmas and the knyaz belts. A barma is a neckpiece or mantle made of gold encrusted with gems and diamonds. Such treasured items were hereditary and closely connected to the knyazs' names; as such, they were always mentioned in the wills.

=== The Barmas ===
Barmas of Old Ryazan were produced by masters of Old Ryazan in late 12th - early 13th century. They are one of the greatest masterpieces of ancient jewellery. The barmas belonged to the local knyaz family, but in 1237 the city was completely destroyed by Batu Khan, so the forsaken jewellery lay underground for nearly 600 years. In 1822, the royal barmas were found by archaeologists and brought to the Kremlin Armory. These precious barmas are high-craft masterpieces, enamelled and encrusted with gems. Some of the barmas have gold medallions with Greek engravings, presumably of Byzantine origin.

=== The Monomakh's Cap ===
The oldest crown is the "Cap of Monomakh" or Crown of Monomakh, used in the ceremony of crowning a monarch in Russia. Its name is connected with a Russian legend of the 15th century, according to which it was brought to Russia in ancient times as a gift from the Byzantine Emperor Constantine Monomachos. The cap is of oriental workmanship of the late 13th or early 14th century. The question of its origin is still unspecified. The oldest section of the crown consists of eight gold plates adorned with very fine gold lace in a pattern of six-pointed rosette stars and lotus blossoms. The semi-spherical top with a cross, the sable trimming and the pearls and gemstones belong to a later period. It weighs 698 grams and is the lightest Russian crown. From the late 14th to the late 17th century, the Cap of Monomakh a symbol of power, was used in the ceremony of setting the ruler of the Russian State for reigning. In the first quarter of the 18th century, after Peter the Great's reforms, the ceremonial setting for reigning was replaced by coronation, the main attribute of which became the imperial crown. Since the 18th century the Cap of Monomakh served as the heraldic crown of the "Tsardom of Great, Little and White Russia".

=== The Kazan Crown ===
Kazan crown is the second oldest in Russia. The gold crown is studded with pearls, garnets, and turquoises. The sable-fur trimming was for comfort. The Kazan Crown is dated 1553. It was first mentioned in the treasury of Tsar Ivan the Terrible, whose reign was marked by a series of important events in Russian history. Among them is the capture of Kazan in October 1552 and the annexation of the Kazan khanate to the Russian state. The precious crown might have been executed by Moscow Kremlin jewellers on the successful solution of "The Eastern problem", so important for Muscovy. Its name might have immortalized the memory of the glorious victory of Russian warriors. The crown's look combines national and Eastern artistic traditions. Some elements are reminiscent of the decor traditions of Russian churches of the epoch. At the same time, the combination of stones, e.g. red tourmalines and rubies with blue turquoise and the carved ornament of knitting herbs on a niello background represent oriental artistic influence. It may have belonged to Ediger Mahmet, the last ruler of the Tatar (Tartar) state of Kazan. Since the 18th century, this crown served as the heraldic crown of the "Tsardom of Kazan".

=== The Ivory Throne ===
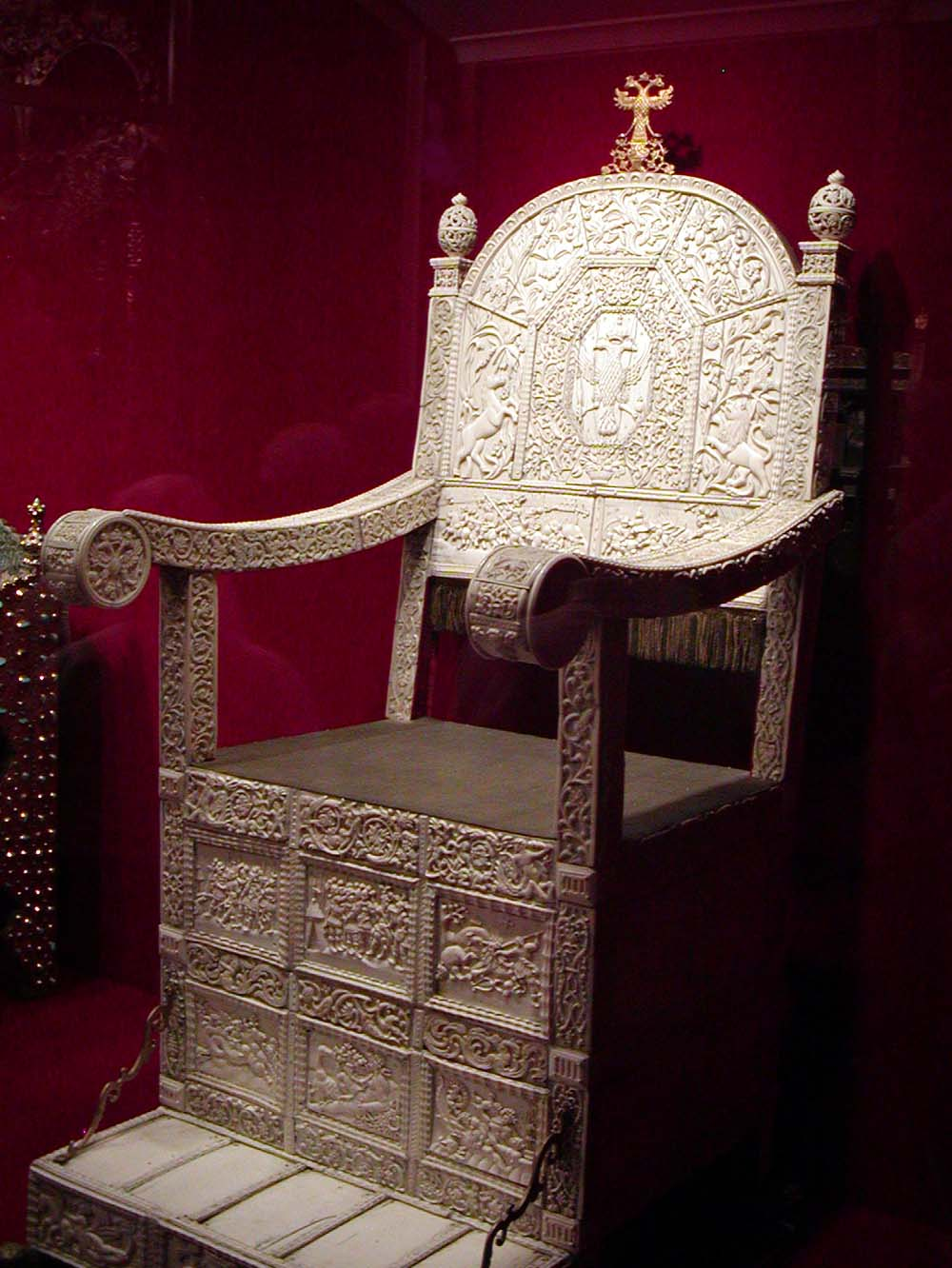
Ivory throne of Ivan IV

The Ivory throne is the earliest preserved tsar throne of the mid-16th century. The throne was made of wood faced with plates of ivory and walrus tusk, therefore it was called the "carved bone armchair". The carved ornament unites the various subjects and representations into a single composition. Decorative scenes include images from Greek mythology and the Old Testament. The depicted themes, the style of the carving and the motifs, which include grotesques and Cupids, enable researchers to date most of the pieces to the 16th century and attribute them to Western European Renaissance craftsmen. This bone throne has been renovated several times in Russia: worn pieces of bone were remade by local craftsmen; in 1856, on the occasion of the coronation of Emperor Alexander II, the throne was decorated with a gilded silver two-headed eagle.

== Regalia of Boris Godunov ==
- Golden throne In addition to the bone chair the showcase includes a throne of oriental workmanship executed in the late 16th century. Having been presented by Shah Abbas I to Tsar Boris Godunov it was called a "Persian throne with stones". The form of the throne with its low back flowing into sloping arm-rests, reveals features typical of Iranian furniture of the 16th-17th centuries. The makers have used ornament beloved in the East, i.e. strips of gold decorated with a foliate pattern and coloured stones - blue turquoises and red rubies, tourmalines. The back of the seat, the arms and the whole lower section of the throne were covered with gold Persian fabric, replaced by French velvet in 1742 for the coronation of Empress Elizabeth. In total, this throne is adorned with 552 rubies and pink tourmalines, 825 turquoises, 177 pearls and 700 halves of pearls.

The Sceptre and orb are creations of West-European jewellers of the late Renaissance period, the enamels used on the relief technique not being known to Russian goldsmiths of that time. There are reasons to consider the sceptre and orb to belong to the set of gifts, brought to Tsar Boris Godunov in 1604, by the Great Embassy of Rudolf II, Emperor of the Great Roman Empire. The sceptre and orb miraculously survived through the Time of Troubles and must have been used in 1613 in the crowning of Michael Fyodorovich, first Tsar of the Romanov Dynasty. Later on during the whole reign of Michael Fyodorovich, they were unique regalia of the kind and belonged to the so-called "Grand set" (precious tsar's attire) complex of especially valuable regalia. Later "Grand set", which, except for the state regalia, included an armour set, that accompanied the Tsar in processions, e.g. military companies and hunting.

- The sceptre The golden sceptre is graceful and proportional, with rich and dainty ornamental motifs. The heads of cherubs, flowers and clusters of fruits suspended on ribbons – everything belongs to a unique, rhythmically sized composition. This ancient sceptre has 1 emerald, 20 diamonds and a few other precious stones.
- The orb Huge golden orb is crowned with a cross. In the upper hemisphere girdles separate it into four sections each with an Old Testament scene from King David's life: "Chrismation of King David by Prophet Samuel", "David's mastering Goliath", "Coming home with the victory", "Persecution from Saul". Shining gems, green emeralds, red rubies, and blue sapphires, encircle the enamel ornamentation. The Orb has 58 diamonds, 89 rubies and tourmalines, 23 sapphires, 51 emeralds and 37 pearls. Except for the 4 enamels, the entire orb, including the cross, is thoroughly encrusted with the various gems.

== Regalia of Michael Fyodorovich ==
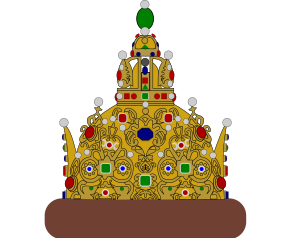
The crown of "Grand set" - "Astrakhan crown"

During the Time of Troubles in 1610-1612, the tsars' treasury was plundered by the Polish troops. They took almost all armour and weapons from the Great Treasury. Still, some items of the utmost value were kept in the occupied Kremlin under the protection of the boyars. When the Seven Boyars agreed to acknowledge Władysław, the king of Poland, as the king of Russia, he spared the historical monarchical insignia. Later the new king of Russia Michael Fyodorovich replenished the treasury with new artefacts. In 1627-1628 the "Grand Set" of regalia was created for him.

- Golden carving chain This chain was presented to Tsar Michael Fyodorovich in 1631 by the Dutch. It was made in Western Europe in the 1620s, later in Russia it was altered and became part of the "Grand set". It consists of 79 carving blackening rectangular links.
- Golden chain The golden chain belonged to Tsar Michael Fyodorovich. It was executed by Kremlin makers and first mentioned in papers of the State treasury in 1640. It consists of 89 rounds, slightly convoluted rings with an ornamental inscription on each ring. The inscription includes a prayer to the Holy Trinity, the complete title of the Tsar with a list of towns, princedoms and lands of the Russian State and the Tsar's hortation to live according to the precepts of God.
- The Crown of the "Grand set" belonged to Tsar Michael Fyodorovich. It was crafted by Kremlin master E. Telepnev in 1627. The Crown has 177 precious stones and pearls. Since the 18th century, this crown served as heraldic crown of the Astrakhan Khanate.

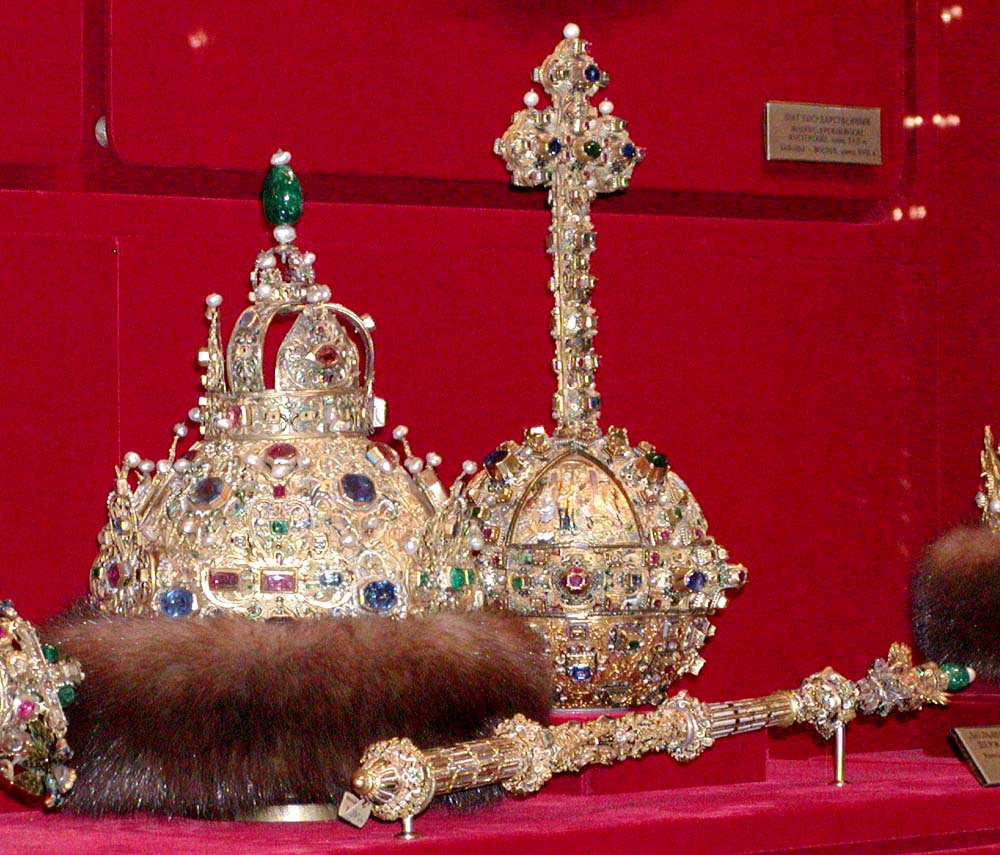
"Grand set": the crown of Michael Fyodorovich with orb and sceptre of Boris Godunov.

- The Golden throne of Tsar Mikhail Fyodorovich was crafted at the beginning of the 17th century from the old chair of oriental workmanship which had belonged to Ivan the Terrible. In its form, high back and arms, it resembles Russian armchairs, but oriental motifs still remain in the ornament: The throne is faced with embossed gold and adorned with rubies, pearls, turquoise and other uncut stones. The throne was made in the early 17th century in Kremlin Workshops. Its decoration is similar to that of the throne of Boris Godunov. 13 kilos of gold, gemstones and pearls were used for its ornamentation. Partly throne's decoration hasn’t survived. A part of the golden plates in the base as well as the throne's pediment were missing. In total on this throne are surviving 1325 rubies and tourmalines, 559 turquoises, 16 pearls, 28 sapphires and 36 other precious stones.

Also "Grand set" consists of various precious armament and equipment, that survived in the Kremlin Armoury. Most important of these things are:

- Saadak and quiver Saadak (precious bow-case) of "Grand set", in complect with quiver, was executed in Kremlin c. 1627: In total saadak and quiver are adorned 183 diamonds, 5 rubies, 34 sapphires, 153 emeralds and 139 tourmalins.
- Shield This precious steel (with carving gold designs) shield was made by master Muchammed Mumin Zernishan in Persia in the late 16th century: Until 1620 it belonged to prince Fyodor Mstislavsky (former Semiboyarzchina Head), after his death it was taken to Kremlin Armoury and became part of "Grand set". It is adorned with 1478 small gemstones and 32 pearls.
- Sabre Sabre of "Grand set" was made by Kremlin masters in the 1620s. It is a very rare artefact that has 552 diamonds and 165 other precious stones, mostly pink tourmalins.
- "State helmet" This helmet - "Jericho cap" - was made in Turkey in the 1600s, and altered in 1621 in Kremlin Armoury by masters N.Davydov and I.Markov, and later in 1642. Steel helmet with golden carving, it has Turkish inscription - quotations from Qur'an. It is adorned 116 diamonds, 10 emeralds, 225 tourmalines and 164 pearls. By the latest legend, this regalia belonged to Saint Alexander Nevsky. Since the 18th century, it served also as heraldic Helmet of Russian Empire.

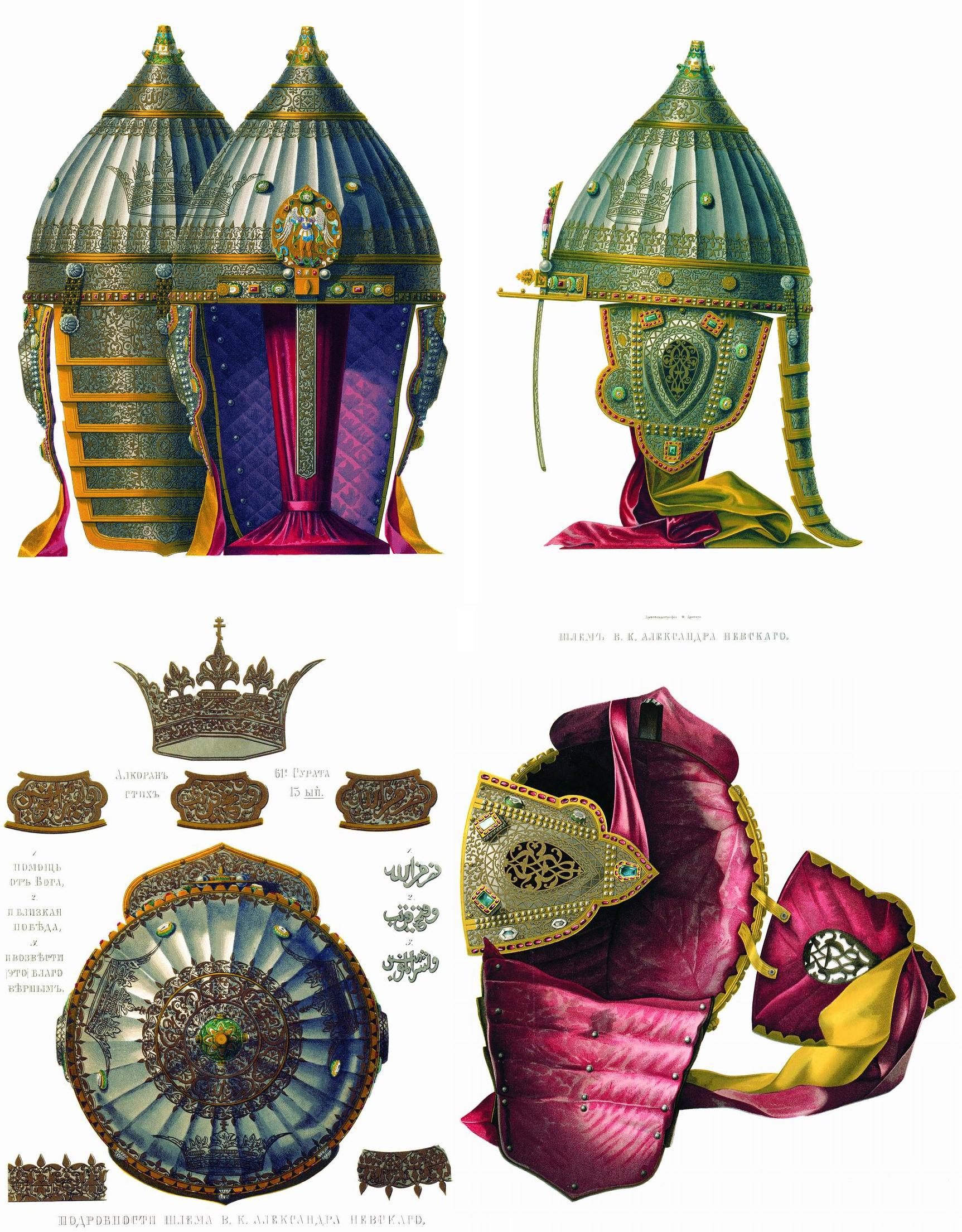
"State helmet" on picture of 19th century

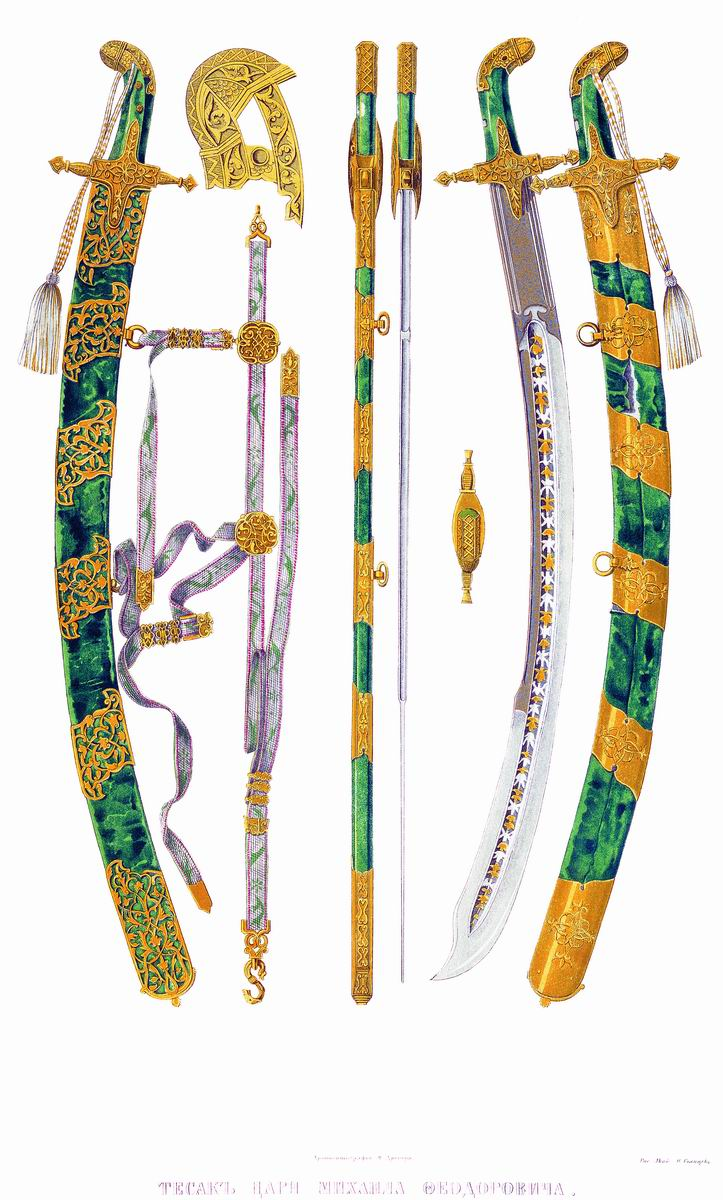
Broadsword of Tsar Michael Fyodorovich on picture, 19th century.

After Tsar Mikhail Fyodorovich's death, the Kremlin Armoury was given his personal jewels and equipment, not applied to the "Grand set". The most important of them are:

- Broadsword Broadsword was executed by master Czech Nil Prosvit in Kremlin Armoury in 1617. It has inscription: «Sy tesak sdeelan poweleniem Gossudara Tzaira i welikoвo Knesa Michaila Feodorowitcha vsea Rrusyi v paetoie leeto gossudarstwa ieвo, maesetza... Po prikasu kraitscheвo y oruschnitscheвo Michaila Michai-lowitscha Saltikowa; deelal master Nial Proswit».
- Sabre Sabre of Prince Fyodor Mstislavsky after his death in 1620 was taken to the tsar's treasury. It was made in Turkey in the 16th century and has Arabian inscriptions.
- Helmet Unique precious helmet of Prince Fyodor Mstislavsky, is made of damascene steel and gold in Ottoman Empire in the 16th century: In 1620 it was taken to tsar's treasury. The helmet is adorned with rubies and turquoises and has quotations from Koran.
- Jericho cap Jericho cap of Prince Fyodor Mstislavsky. Ottoman Empire, 1600s.
- Jericho cap Jericho cap of Prince A.M. Lvov. Made in the Ottoman Empire probably in the 1610s-1620s.

== Regalia of Alexis Mikhailovich ==
New Tsar Alexis Mikhailovich ordered his regalia mostly in Turkey and Persia in 1650s-1660s. His "Grand Set" consists of:

- The sceptre Sceptre was executed in Constantinople in 1658 and presented to the Tsar by a Greek Ivan Anastasov: This oriental sceptre has mace form. It has 268 diamonds, 14 emeralds, 360 other precious stones. Golden handle has 12 small carved medallions this pictures of great Christian holidays: the Annunciation, the Ascension of Jesus, Christmas Day, Feast of the Presentation of Jesus at the Temple, Epiphany, Raising of Lazarus, the Transfiguration of Jesus, Palm Sunday, the Crucifixion of Jesus, Resurrection of Jesus, Pentecost, Assuring of St Thomas.
- The orb was brought to Tsar Alexis Mikhailovich in 1662 from Constantinople together with the sceptre. It has 179 diamonds and 340 other precious stones.
- Barmas Barmas of Alexis Mikhailovich executed in Constantinople on his order in 1662. It is a round silk collar, adorned with seven precious medallions. The centre of medallions are round golden plates with religious compositions of colour enamels. Three large medallions are of particular interest. Two of them are not plane, like all the others, but a little bossy. They were to cover shoulders. The shape of the third medallion is a bit different, so it can be considered a central one. It is adorned with a scene of Our Lady sitting with a Baby in her lap, crowned by two angels. One shoulder medallion includes a cross confronted by Saints – Roman Emperor Constantine I and his mother Helen, who were famous devotees of Christianity. Another shoulder medallion presented Basil the Great and Saint Warrior Mercury, piking Emperor Julian, enemy of Christians. A legend says he was killed by Saint Mercury, who pretended to be an enemy warrior. The precious holy of the 17th century may have hinted the role of the royal power in the Christian world and the mission of the very Russian Tsar. In total all 7 precious medallions have 248 diamonds and 255 other precious stones.

Also a private treasury of Alexis Mikhailovich consisted of:

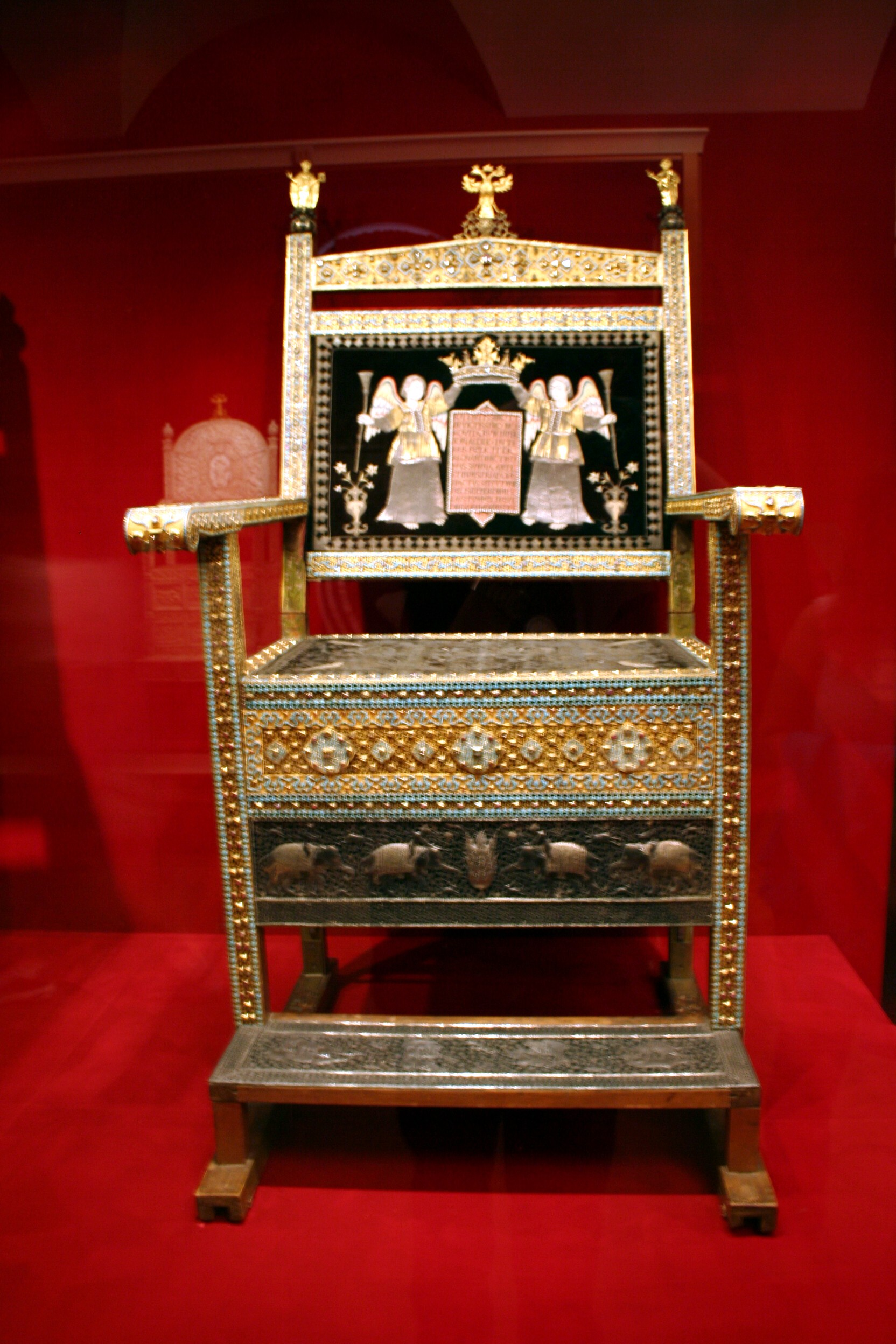
Diamond throne of Tsar Alexis Mikhailovich, in Kremlin Armoury.

- Diamond throne The shape of the so-called "diamond armchair" of Tsar Alexei Mikhailovich, the most elaborate of the Royal thrones in the Armoury collection, is reminiscent of the throne of Tsar Mikhail, his father. The throne was made by Persian craftsmen in 1659 and granted to the Tsar by merchants Ichto Modovletov and Zakharia Saradarov from the Armenian Trading Company in 1660. The throne has been made of sandalwood faced with golden and silver plates with foliate ornamentation. Its bottom is decorated with a bold carved pattern depicting a procession of elephants and drivers on their backs. The back of the throne is covered with black velvet and embroidered images of two genii supporting a crown over the inscription glorifying the Tsar and his power. The whole surface of the throne is faced with an intricate mosaic of turquoise and diamonds. The precious donation was attached to the petition of tax-free trading in the Russian territory. The Armenian merchants got 4000 silver rubles and 19000 copper rubles for this throne. For the prevalence of diamonds the throne was named "Diamond Throne". In total throne has 876 diamonds and 1223 other gemstones. On the back of this throne there is an embroidered Latin inscription: "Potentissimo et invictissimo Moscovitarum Imperatori Alexio, in terris feliciter regnanti, hic thronus, summa arte et industria fabrefactus, sit futuri in coelis et perennis faustum felixque omen. Anno Domini, 1659" ("To the most powerful and invincible Muscovy Emperor Alexis doth reign felicitously upon the earth the throne made with sumptuous art would be a token of future eternal bliss in heaven. In the Year of Our Lord. 1659").
- The staff "His Majesty's staff": This precious staff was executed in Constantinople in 1658 and presented to Tsar by a Greek Ivan Anastasov in 1662. It has a lily on top. In total this unique oriental staff has 178 diamonds, 259 emeralds, 3 pearls and 369 pink tourmalines.
- Plaque-pendant Precious plaque-pendant for tsars coronation clothes was executed in Constantinople in the 1660s.

Also, Tsar Alexis Mikhailovich had various personal military equipment of his own "Grand set". Now these artefacts are on display in the Kremlin Armoury, the most famous of them are:

- Saadak and quiver Precious saadak in complect with quiver was executed in Constantinople and presented to the Tsar by Greeks Ivan Yuriev and Dmitry Astafiev in 1656: In total unique oriental saadak and quiver have 306 diamonds, 40 emeralds and 1256 tourmalines.
- Sabre Precious sabre was made in Constantinople and presented to the Tsar by Greek Ivan Bulgakov in 1656:
- Helmet Helmet-Jericho cap of "Grand set" was made in Turkey in the 1600s, until 1620 it belonged to Prince Fyodor Mstislavsky and later - to Tsar Alexis Mikhailovich: It has golden and silver designs and 61 pearls and gemstones.
- Concir State sword-concir in golden sheath was executed in Constantinople and presented to Tsar Alexei Mikhailovich by Greek Dmitry Astafiev in 1657. Concirs sheath is adorned by 63 tourmalins and 205 turquoises.
- Busdychan The mace-busdychan of "Grand set" was executed in Constantinople and presented to Tsar Alexei Mikhailovich by Greek Dmitry Astafiev in 1655. It has 46 emeralds and 109 pink tourmalines.

== Tsars' regalia 1660s-1680s ==
- Pectoral cross with a chain This cross was executed by Kremlin masters in 1662 and altered in 1682. Only this regalia survived from "Grand set" of Theodore Alekseevich - elder son of Alexis Mikhailovich. It is golden cross with diamonds, with golden chain. On facial side of cross there is 4 enamelled medallions this pictures of: The Transfiguration of Jesus, The Crucifixion of Jesus, Last Supper and Entombment of Jesus. On the verso of the cross there is an image of a heaven protector of the Tsar - Theodore Stratilates. The figure of the Saint, floral pattern around it, as well as religious scenes on the obverse of the cross are executed in bright shining colours, which make all the compositions similar to a multicolour shining mosaics.

In 1682 Russia received two co-rulers - Ivan V Alekseevich and Peter I Alekseevich. Both of them had own jewels (but one throne).

- Silver double throne The Double throne of Tsars Ivan Alekseyevich and Peter Alekseyevich, which serves as a vivid illustration of the unique historical moment, when two tsarevitches were crowned together: Tsar Alexis died leaving three sons. After the death of the eldest one, Theodore, fifteen-year-old Ivan should have inherited the throne, but he was feeble-minded and in poor health. So it was decided to crown the two brothers together, Ivan and ten-year-old Peter (the future Peter the Great). The double-seated throne was executed specially for the occasion by the Kremlin craftsmen in the 1680s. Its constriction including open-work arch on twisted columns, silver steps below and a high back with two silver pillars on each side resembles elegant architectural forms. The necessary instructions and advice were transmitted through a small orifice cut into the back of the throne and concealed by the velvet covering. The shape of the throne is finished with a lavish ornamentation. The openwork embossment, three-dimensional animal figures, carving and high relief, contrasting combination of silver and gilt are exemplificative of the Baroque style.

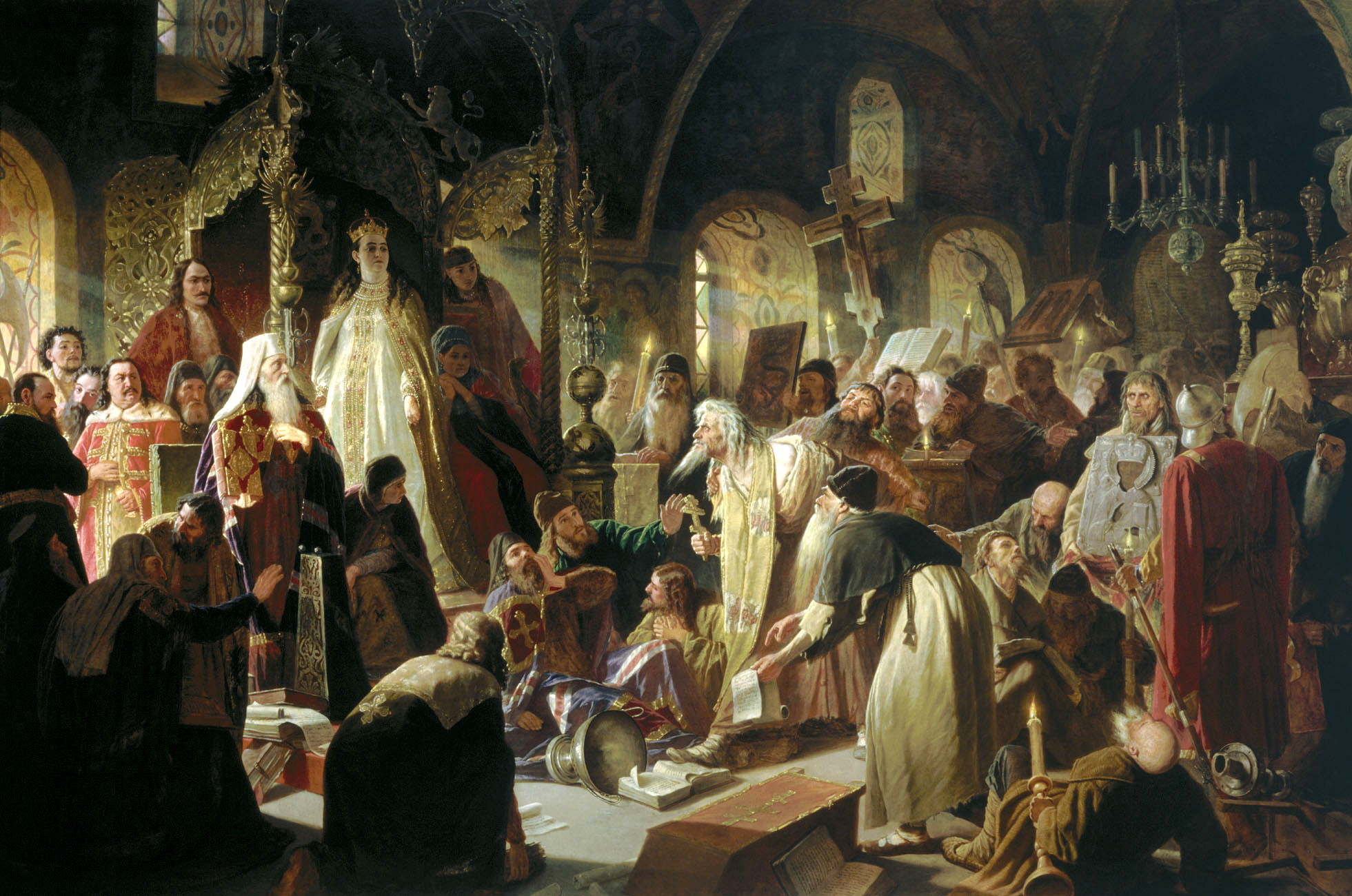
Old Believer Priest Nikita Pustosviat Disputing with Patriarch Joachim on Matters of Faith. Painting by Vasily Perov (1880). Behind - stand silver double throne.

- Cap of Monomach of second set Simple "cap of Monomakh of the second set" of Tsar Peter I Alekseevich was executed by Kremlin Workshops for the 1682 crowning ceremony, when two small sons of Alexis Mikhailovich – Ivan and Peter – were inaugurated as Tsars: The creators did their best following the ancient original. It reminds an Eastern headdress and consists of 8 golden plates. The crown has a dome-shaped top with a cross. However, there is certain difference in artistic decoration of the two crowns. The surface of the ancient one is covered with a delicate filigree ornamentation. The golden plates of the new crown were left smooth. Cold shining metal with sharp symmetric decor makes impression of elegant severity, a bit mildened by bright and colourful precious stones. Since the 18th century this crown served as heraldic crown of Tsardom of the Chersonnese Taurics.
- Altabas crown Altabas crown of the third set of Tsar Ivan V Alekseevich was executed by Russian masters in 1684. Altabas is a precious cloth, similar to brocade. So the crown was named altabas. It is the only tsars crown executed of cloth. For the crown would not lose the shape, it had an inner frame of smooth silver arches. The crown was adorned with golden plates enameled with bright colours and coloured with gems. Some of these plates were taken from the not survived Diamond Crown of Tsar Theodore Alekseevich. In total it has circa 100 gemstones and pearls. Since 18th century this crown served as heraldic crown of "Tsardom of Siberia".

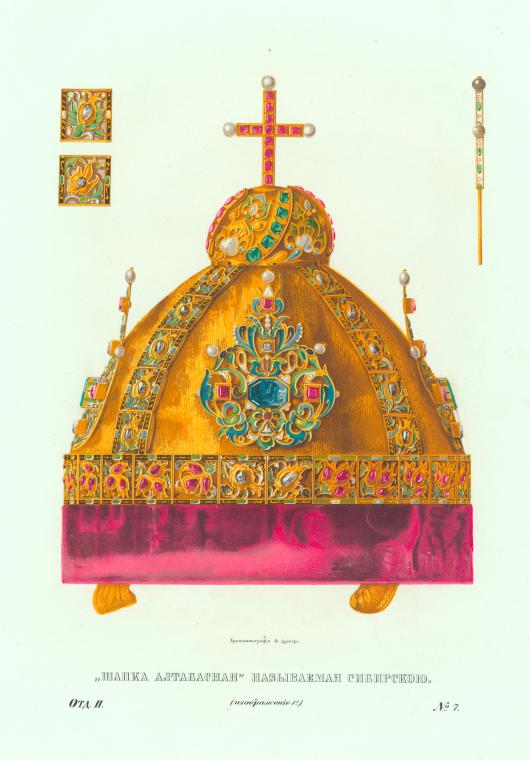
Picture of altabas crown, c. 1835.

- Diamond crown This crown was executed by Russian masters for Tsar Peter I Alekseevich in the 1680s: A similar crown was made for his elder brother, crowned at the same time. The decor of the crown represents specific features of Russian jewelry of the late 17th century, a specific feature of which was the active use of precious stones. Shining diamonds and gems always attracted attention of Russian goldsmiths, and that time they became the main point of jewelry artworks. The Crown of Peter Alekseevich was enriched with green emeralds and red tourmalines. In total metallic golden frame of crown is adorned 807 diamonds (in 32 designs) and 13 other gemstones.
- Diamond crown One of the two crowns was made in the 1680s by Russian jewelers for Ivan V Alekseevich: The decor of the crown is traditional for Russian jewelry of the late 17th century, a special point of which was active use of luxurious precious stones. On the crown's top there is a precious crimson lal. This golden crown has circa 900 diamonds and a few other precious stones.

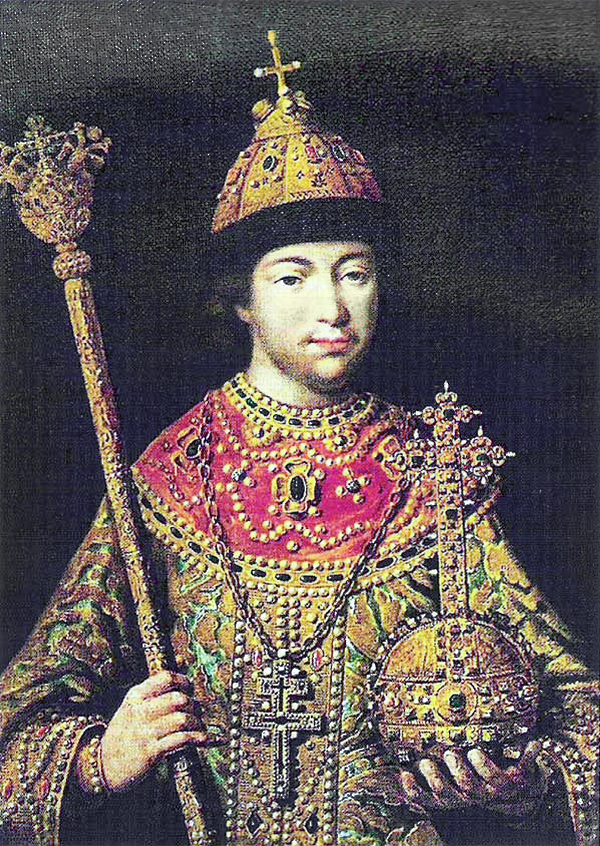
Young Russian Tsar with "Cap of Monomakh", sceptre of Alexis Mikhailovich and orb of Boris Godunov.

- Pectoral cross of Tsar Peter I Alekseevich The golden cross of Tsar Peter Alekseevich was made in Kremlin workshops in the 1780s. In the center of its obverse there is a small cross made of magnificent emeralds of different cutting and shape, adorned with openwork vegetation ornament and enamels. The shape and decor of the emerald cross allow to classify it as an artwork of West European silversmiths of the 16-17th centuries. A carved crucifix on one emerald and a carved inscription "NIKA" on another are of Russian origin and can be dated by the same time. On the cross's reverse there is a front enamelled image of Apostle Peter, the Tsar's patron Saint. The enamelled decor of the cross in combination with shining precious stones give major impression in accordance with the common tendencies of development of Russian art of the time. The bright artistic concept and brilliant craft make the item a true masterpiece of the 18th century jewelry.
- Sceptre of Tsar Peter I Alekseevich The sceptre belonging to Tsar Peter I was made of gold and adorned with colour enamels and precious stones. The hexahedral sceptre divides into three with three bolsters and its lower part ends with a bolster with a figured knob. The sceptre's form and details are close to the sceptre of Tsar Michael Fyodorovich of the 17th century. The decor reflects artistic taste of the late 17th century. Black and pink enamels on blue background, vegetation ornament of miniature graceful tulips, leaves and curls – all these have analogies in artworks by Kremlin jewelers of the 1780s and 1790s. The sceptre must have been executed in 1682 on the occasion of setting for reigning of brothers Ivan and Peter Alekseevich. While the ceremonial, Ivan Alekseevich took the sceptre of his grandfather, and the new sceptre, created following the pattern of the worshipped holy, was brought for the younger Tsar, Peter Alekseevich.
- Mace The mace of "Grand set" appeared only 15 March 1692. It was presented to Tsar Ivan V Alekseevich by Persian Shah Suleiman among ambassador Sulein-Han. Golden oriental mace, it adorned by precious stones, total length 71,8 cm. In 1790 prince G.Potyomkin (who was also chief of Kremlin Armoury) take it instead of marschallstab, after his death the mace was returned to Kremlin.

== Regalia of the Russian Empire ==
The coronation in the Russian Empire was a sophisticated ceremony, scrutinized in tiny details and requiring thorough preparation. The final set of Imperial regalia was formed in 1723-1724, since that time it included the Great Imperial Crown, the Small Crown, the Imperial Sceptre, the Imperial Orb, the Mantle, the Big Chain and Star of the Order of St. Andrew, the state shield, the state sword, and the state seal.

- The Crown of Empress Catherine I was first new-type Imperial crown after the tsars' caps of previous monarchs. It was designed by the court master Samson Larionov and created with the help of 10 Moscow Kremlin masters in 1724 for the coronation of Empress Catherine I, second wife of Peter the Great. In a month after the ceremony the crown of Catherine I was dismantled, its 2000 diamonds and a huge Chinese tourmalin were added to the new crown. The gilded silver carcass of this crown is displayed in Kremlin Armoury.
- The Orb of Emperor Peter II is a simple small golden orb with silver belt and cross, not encrusted with any gemstones. It is kept in the Kremlin Armoury since 30 May 1728.
- The Crown of Empress Anna Ivanovna is one of the first new-type Russian crowns. It was crafted by Gottlieb Wilhelm Dunkel in Saint Petersburg in 1731 for Empress Anna's coronation ceremony. Later, the crown was modified in the 1730s. The crown is made of silver and adorned with 2536 diamonds, 28 other gemstones and one huge red tourmaline in c.500 carat. The form was to become traditional: two open-work hemispheres divided by a movable arc with a cross in the middle and a broad circlet. This regalia was given to Kremlin Armory on 14 March 1741. In 1826 it was used for the personal coronation of Emperor Nicholas I in Warsaw as the Polish king. Later this crown served as the heraldic crown of "Tsardom of Poland".
- The Agraf (a buckle for imperial mantle) was made by Jérémie Pauzié for Empress Elizabeth in Saint Petersburg in the 1760s. The Agraf looks as three small branches with leaves and tiny flowers. It is 25 cm long and 11 wide, encrusted with 805 diamonds, 475.44 carat. Currently it is displayed in the permanent exhibition of the Diamond Fund.

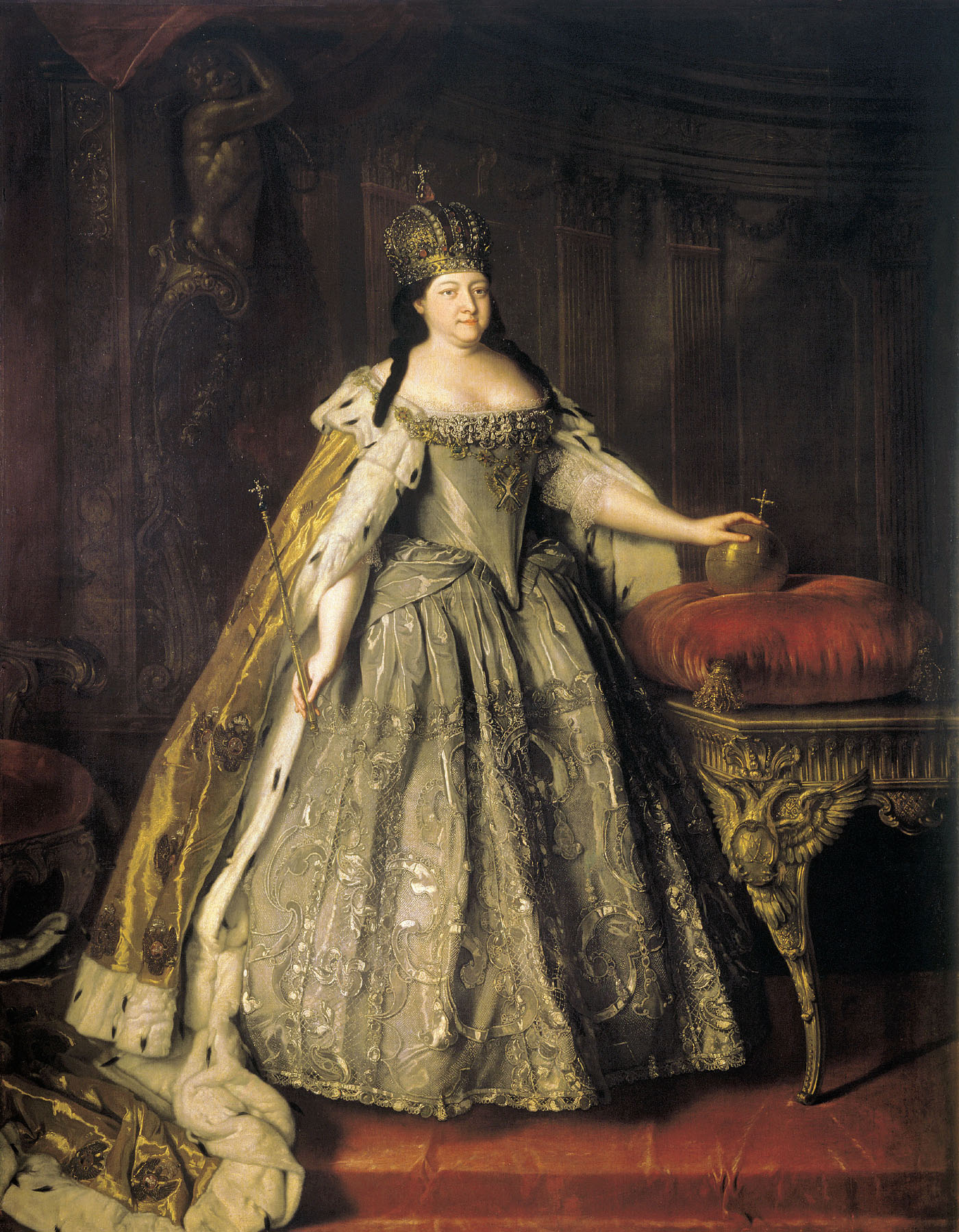
Empress Anna Ivanovna with her crown, portrait by Louis Caravaque.

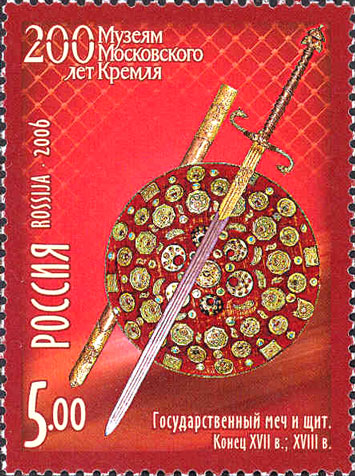
State sword and shield on Russian post stamp.

- The Great Imperial Crown is the largest of Russian imperial crowns. It was made in Saint Petersburg by Georg Friedrich Eckart and Jérémie Pauzié in 1762, in 1797 crown was altered by L.D. Diuval. It has 4936 diamonds, 75 huge pearls and one huge red spinel in 398.72 carat. The crown nowadays belongs to the Diamond Fund and stays in the permanent exhibition.
- The Imperial sceptre was crafted by the court jewellers L. Pfisterer and I. Leontovich for Empress Catherine II in Saint Petersburg in 1771 and altered in 1774. The sceptre holds the famous "Orlov" diamond and 196 another diamonds. For the first time it was used in coronation ceremony of Paul I and thus officially included into the Imperial Insignia.
- The Imperial orb was crafted by the jeweller G.F. Ekart for Empress Catherine II in Moscow in 1762 and altered circa 1774. The smooth golden orb has a diamond belt and a cross with huge 195K sapphire, that was added by order of Paul I. The belts have 1370 diamonds.

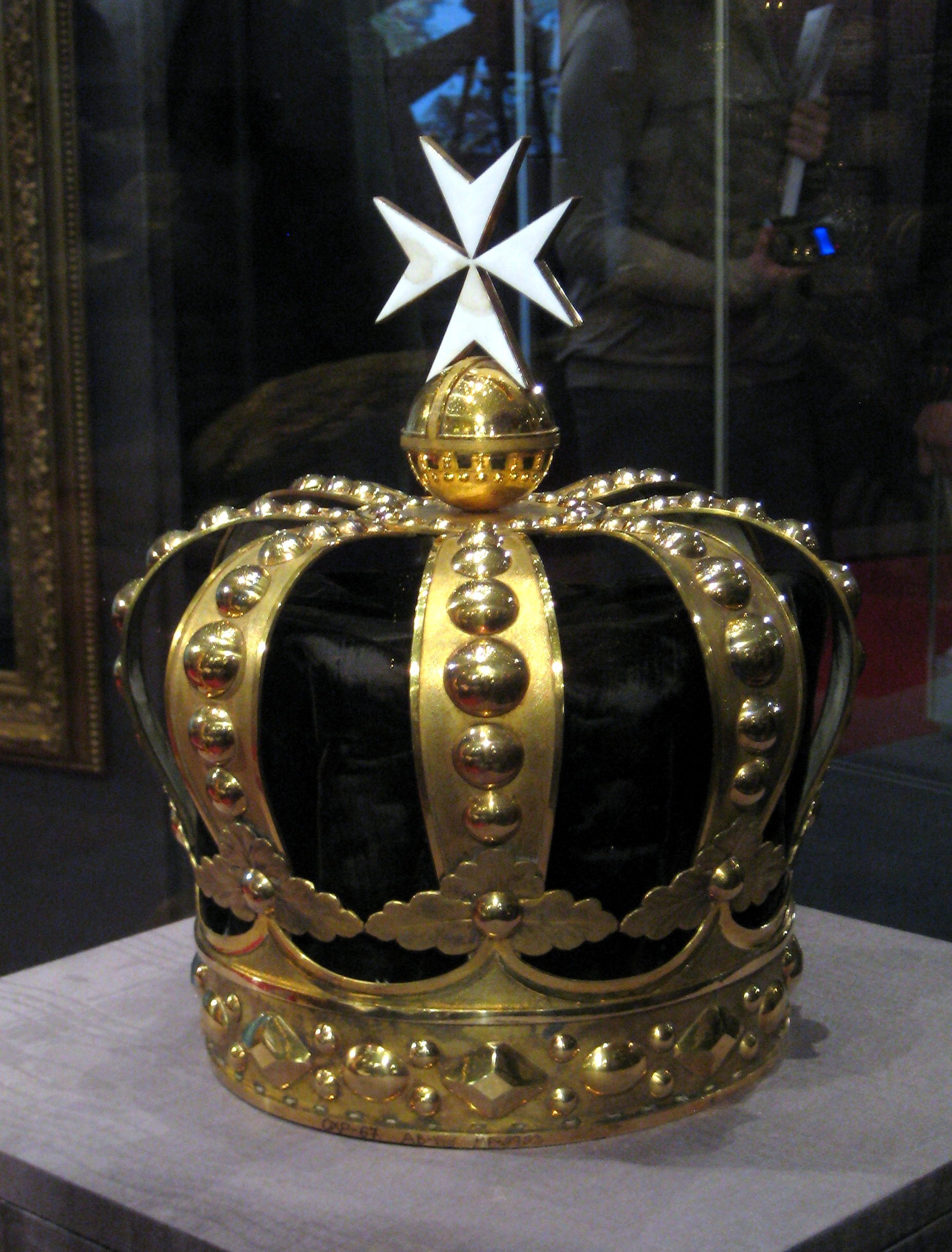
Maltese crown of Emperor Paul I in the Kremlin.

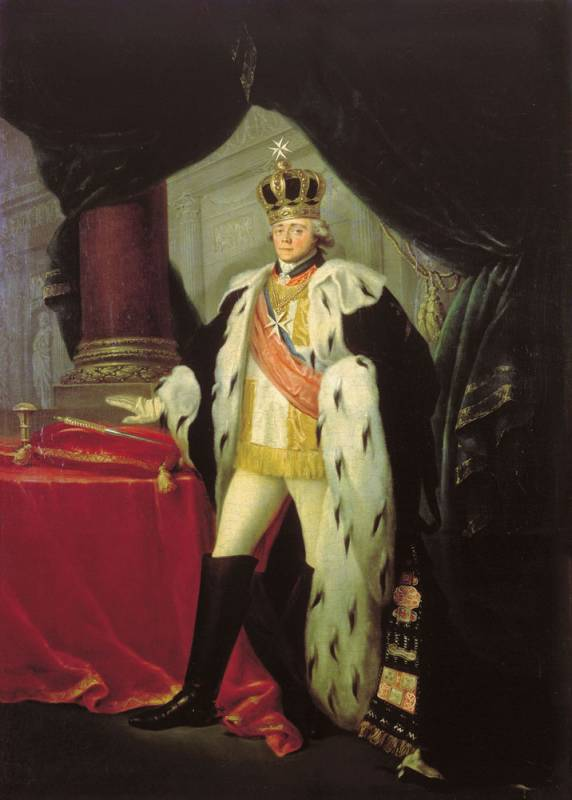
Paul I as Grand Master of Knights of Malta. Portrait by Salvatore Tonci.

- The Maltese crown of Emperor Paul I, and other Order's relics, were presented to Paul I in 1798 by the Knights of Malta when he was elected as Grand Master. This regalia was made by stamping gilded silver, surmounted by a golden sphere and golden enamelled "maltese" cross. Until 1803 it also served as the heraldic crown. In 1827 it was given to the Kremlin Armory. Total weight - 1753.00 gr.
- The State sword appeared only in the late 18th century, in Paul I's time. An old Polish steel blade (late 17th century), with a newly gilded silver sword-hilt, was used to make it. Total length with a haft - 141 cm.
- The State shield was made by Russian masters in the late 17th century, but it only became the state regalia in Paul I's time. This shield is adorned by carving golden and silver designs with more than 150 gemstones: Its diameter - 58,4 cm.
- The Lesser Imperial Crown was created by master L. Zeftigen for Empress Maria Alexandrovna in St Petersburg in 1856. The design was made on the basis of jeweller's L. D. Diuval (1797) sketches. The crown is kept in the Diamond Fund of Russia.

== Ancient regalia in Russian Great State Coat of Arms ==
Until 1917 several ancient regalia served as heraldic crowns of various lands of the Russian Empire.

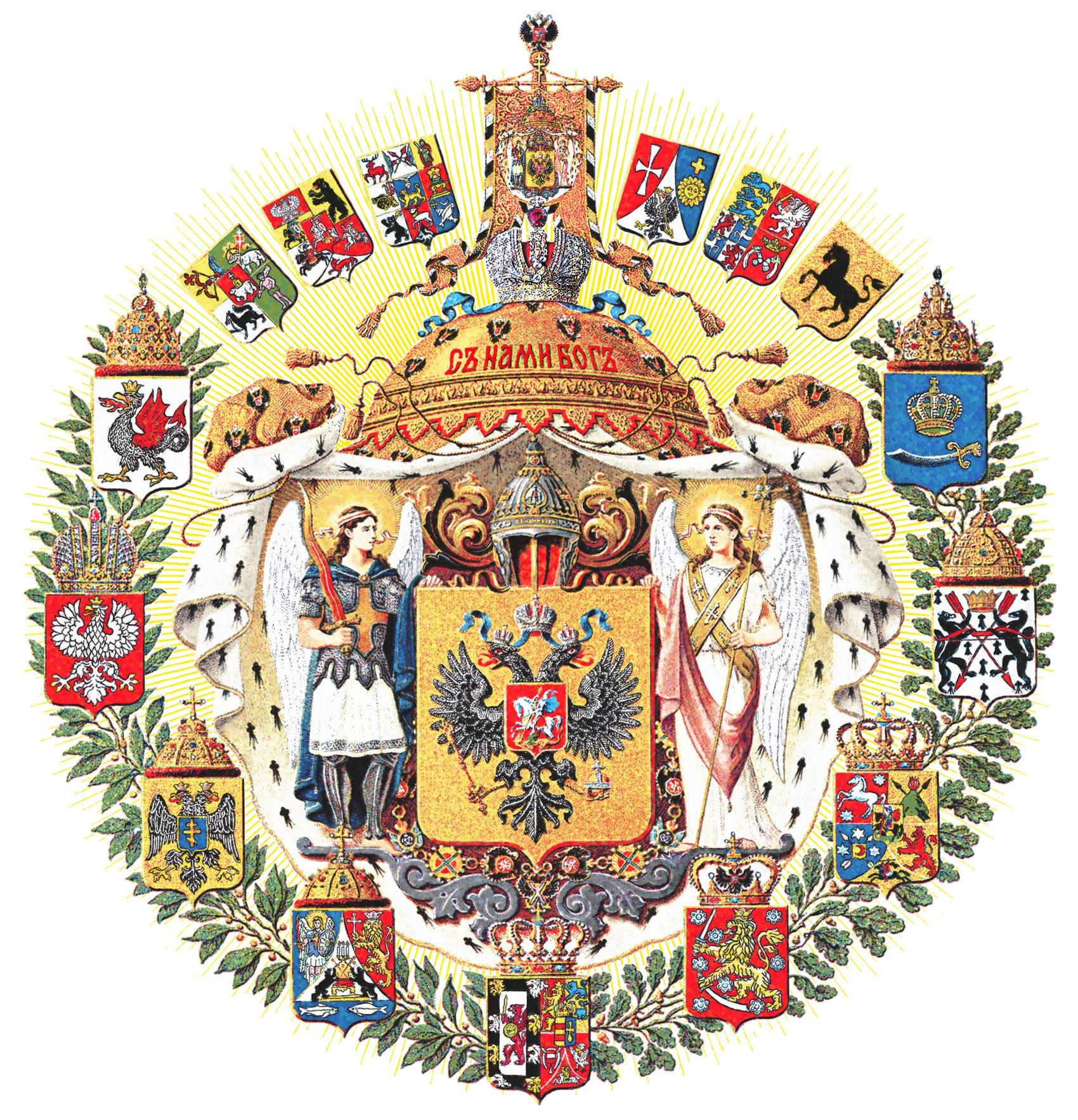
Great State Coat of Arms of Russian Empire. Presented drawing of Artist Igor Barbe, 2006, "Greater Coat of Arms of the Russian Empire" 1882-1917

Disposition of crowns on Great State Coat of Arms:

- Great Imperial Crown - at the top, on imperial mantle.
- The crown of "Grand set" - on shield of the coat of arms of Astrahan Tsardom.
- Altabas crown - on shield on the coat of arms of Siberia.
- Lost "Georgian Crown" - on shield on the coat of arms of Georgia. This crown was demolished or sold by the Soviets in the 1930s.
- Only heraldic crown - on shield on the coat of arms of Finland.
- Only heraldic crown - on shield on the family coat of arms of House Holstein-Gottorp-Romanov.
- "Cap of Monomakh" - on shield of the coat of arms of "Tsardom of Great, Little and White Russia".
- "Cap of Monomakh of the second set" - on shield of the coat of arms of Crimea.
- Crown of Empress Anna Ivanovna - on shield of the coat of arms of Poland.
- Kazan crown - on shield of the coat of arms of Kazan Tsardom.
- "State helmet" of Michael Fyodorovich - in center, on shield of the small coat of arms of Russian Empire.

Also, Maltese crown served as heraldic until 1803. It can be still found in coat of arms of the Russian town of Gatchina.

== See also ==
- Coronation of the Russian monarch
- House of Romanov
- Imperial Crown of Russia
- Kremlin Armoury
- Monomakh's Cap
- Muscovy Crown
- Orlov (diamond)

== Sources ==
- Bykova, J. I. (2014). Коронационные венцы Екатерины I и Петра II. Сходство и различия [The Coronation Crowns of Catherine II and Peter I. Similarities and differences] (in Russian). Saint Petersburg, Russia: The State Hermitage Museum. pp. 91–104.
- Hellberg-Hirn, Elena (1998). Soil and Soul: The Symbolic World of Russianness. Ashgate Publishing. ISBN 978-0-367-13404-4.
- Judakov, I. J. (2013). Московский Кремль. Красная площадь [The Moscow Kremlin. The Red square]. Moscow: Judakov I. P. p. 58-70. ISBN 978-5-904813-03-1.
- Volkova, M. A. (2011). Царские регалии как символы власти в русской художественной культуре XVIII века [The Tzars' Regalia as Power insignia in the 18th century Russian Art and Culture] (PDF). Коронационные регалии в церемонии императорской коронации в России XVIII века (in Russian). Moscow State University: 3–25.
- Zimin, Igor (2013). Царские деньги. Доходы и расходы Дома Романовых. Повседневная жизнь Российского императорского двора [Tzars’ Money. Revenues and expenses of the Romanovs. Everyday Life of the Russian Imperial Court] (in Russian). Moscow: Tsentrpoligraph. ISBN 978-5-227-04582-9.
