= Emperor of Russia =

Title of the ruling monarch of Russia from 1721 to 1917

Emperor and Autocrat of all Russia
- Императоръ и Самодержецъ Всероссійскій
- Imperial
- Imperial Standard (1858–1917)

- Last to reign Nicholas II; 1 November 1894 – 15 March 1917

Details
- Style: His/Her Imperial Majesty
- First monarch: Peter I
- Last monarch: Nicholas II
- Formed: 2 November 1721
- Abolished: 15 March 1917
- Residences: Winter Palace; Moscow Kremlin; Peterhof Palace; Catherine Palace; Alexander Palace
- Appointer: Hereditary
- Pretenders: Grand Duchess Maria Vladimirovna of Russia; Prince Karl Emich of Leiningen

The Emperor and Autocrat of all Russia (Note: Also translated as emperor and autocrat of all the Russias; Russian: Император и Самодержец Всероссийский, romanized: Imperator i Samoderzhets Vserossiyskiy, pre-1918 orthography: Императоръ и Самодержецъ Всероссійскій, Императрица и Самодержица Всероссійская, IPA: [ɪm⁽ʲ⁾pʲɪˈratər ɪ səmɐˈdʲerʐɨt͡s fsʲɪrɐˈsʲijskʲɪj]) was the official title of the Russian monarch from 1721 to 1917.

The title originated in connection with Russia's victory in the Great Northern War (1700–1721) and appeared as an adaptation of the tsar's title under the accepted system of titling in Europe. The title was transformed from the previous title of tsar and grand prince of all Russia. The old title tsar (or tsaritsa) continued to be popularly used to refer to the emperor (or empress) until the monarchy was abolished in 1918.

== Title ==
Article 1 of the Fundamental Laws of the Russian Empire stated that "the Emperor of All Russia is an autocratic and unrestricted monarch. To obey his supreme authority, not only out of fear but out of conscience as well, God himself commands".

The full title of the emperor in the 20th century (Art. 37 of the Fundamental Laws) was:

By the Grace of God, We, NN, Emperor and Autocrat of All the Russias, Moscow, Kiev, Vladimir, Novgorod; Tsar of Kazan, Tsar of Astrakhan, Tsar of Poland, Tsar of Siberia, Tsar of Chersonese Taurian, Tsar of Georgia; Lord of Pskov and Grand Prince of Smolensk, Lithuania, Volhynia, Podolia, Finland; Prince of Estland, Livland, Courland, Semigalia, Samogitia, Belostok, Karelia, Tver, Yugra, Perm, Vyatka, Bolgar and others; Lord and Grand Prince of Nizhny Novgorod, Chernigov, Ryazan, Polotsk, Rostov, Yaroslavl, Beloozero, Udoria, Obdoria, Kondia, Vitebsk, Mstislav, and all of the northern countries Master; and Lord of Iberia, Kartli, and Kabardia lands and Armenian provinces; hereditary Sovereign and ruler of the Circassian and Mountainous Princes and of others; Lord of Turkestan; Heir of Norway; Duke of Schleswig-Holstein, Stormarn, Dithmarschen, and Oldenburg, and others, and others, and others.

== Tsarist autocracy ==
The tsar himself, the embodiment of sovereign authority, stood at the center of the tsarist autocracy, with full power over the state and its people. The autocrat delegated power to persons and institutions acting on his orders, and within the limits of his laws. The tsar was metaphorically a father and all of his subjects were his children; this metaphor even appeared in Orthodox primers, and is remembered in the common Russian expression "царь-батюшка" tsar-batyushka ("tsar-dear father").

Unlike the movement for separation of church and state in West European monarchies, the Russian Empire combined monarchy with the supreme authority on religious issues (see Church reform of Peter I and caesaropapism for details).

In Russia, the tsar owned a much higher proportion of the state (lands, enterprises, etc.) than did Western monarchs.

== Support by intellectuals ==
Major Russian advocates and theorists of the autocracy included writer Fyodor Dostoyevsky, Mikhail Katkov, Konstantin Aksakov, Nikolay Karamzin, Konstantin Pobedonostsev and Pyotr Semyonov. They all argued that a strong and prosperous Russia needed a strong tsar and that philosophies of republicanism and liberal democracy were alien to it.

== History ==
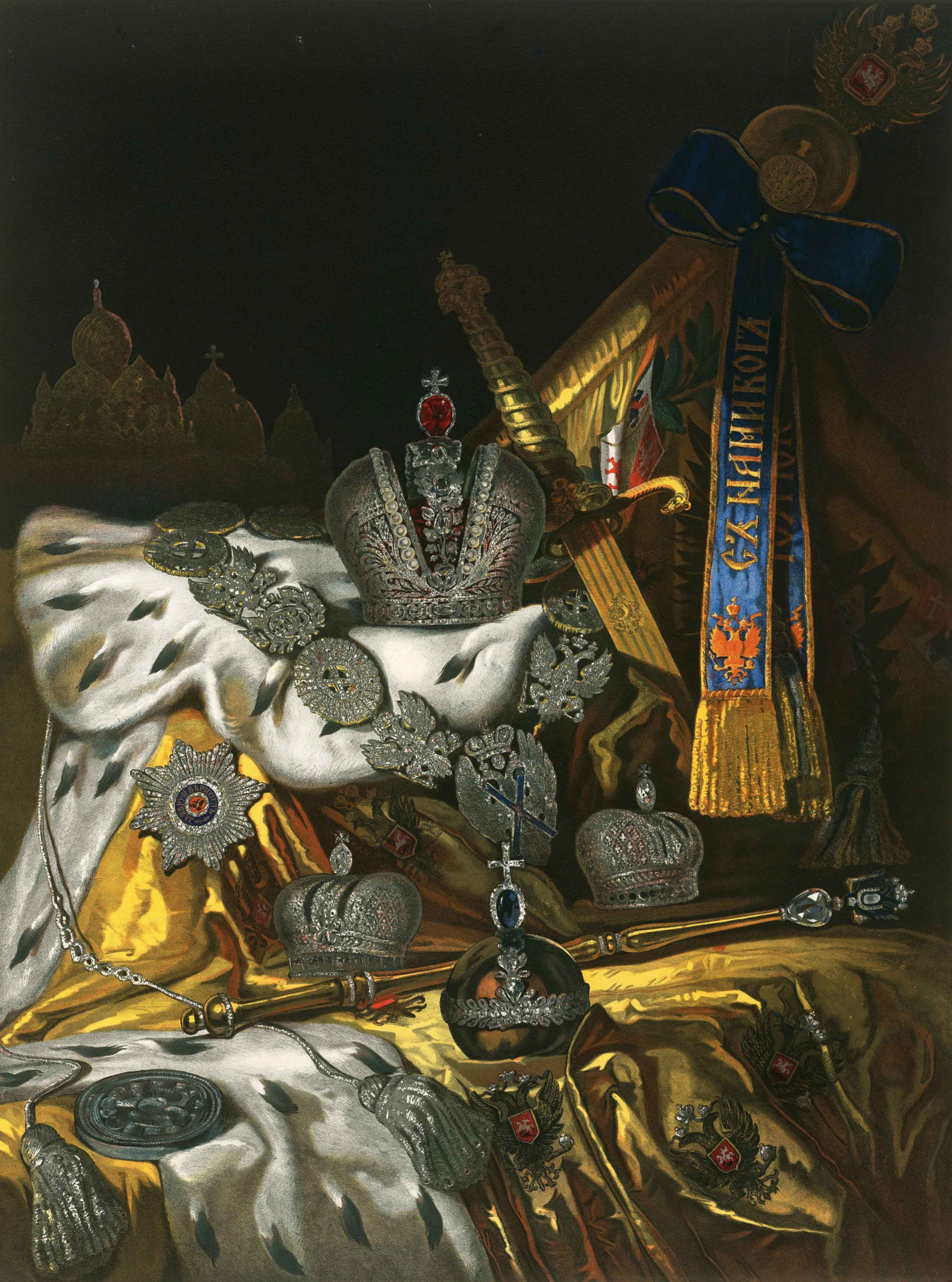
Regalia of the Emperor

Peter I recognized the need to secure the position of Russia within the European states system, including the importance of securing recognition from the Holy Roman Emperor of the equality of the titles of tsar and emperor. Following his victory at the Battle of Poltava, Peter I brought up the question of the title of emperor to the Viennese court. In 1717, Peter I defended his right to use the title of imperator, using the letter from Maximilian I to Vasily III to support his claim.

The title of Emperor of all Russia was introduced for Peter the Great. After his victory in the Great Northern War and the signing the Treaty of Nystad in September 1721, the Senate and Synod decided to award Peter with the title of Emperor of all Russia with the following statement: "in the manner of the Roman Senate for the noble cause of emperors such titles publicly given them as a gift and into statues for the everlasting generations inscribed".

On this 20th day of October, after a consultation of the Senate together with the Holy Synod accepted the intention, to his majesty, in the testimony of a proper gratitude for his high grace and paternalism and effort which he for the welfare of state in all his glorious time of ruling and especially during the past Swedish War, deigned to manifest, and all-Russian state in such a strong and good fortune, and his people subjected to such fame over the whole world through his unique ruling led, as that to all quite known, by the name of all the Russian people to ask, so graciously to accept, following the example of others, from them title: the Father of the Fatherland, the Emperor of All Russia, Peter the Great ...

— Laws of the Russian Empire at Large. Vol.VI. No.3840

On November 2, 1721, Peter I accepted the title. The Dutch Republic and Kingdom of Prussia immediately recognized the new title of the Russian monarch, followed by the Kingdom of Sweden in 1723, the Ottoman Empire in 1739, the United Kingdom and Austria in 1742, (Note: Vienna initially refused to accept the title, but eventually conceded after the letter was deemed to be genuine.) the Holy Roman Empire, the Kingdom of France and Spain in 1745, and finally the Polish–Lithuanian Commonwealth in 1764. From then on, the Russian state was referred to as the Russian Empire.

On February 16, 1722, Peter I issued the Decree of Succession by which he abolished the old custom of passing the throne to the direct descendants in the male line, but allowed the appointment of an heir through any decent person, at the will of the monarch.

== Coronation ceremony ==
Coronations in the Russian Empire involved a highly developed religious ceremony in which the emperor was crowned and invested with regalia, then anointed with chrism and formally blessed by the church to commence his reign. Although the grand princes of Moscow had been crowned prior to the reign of Ivan III (r. 1462–1505), their coronation rituals assumed overt Byzantine overtones as the result of the influence of Ivan's wife Sophia Paleologue, and the imperial ambitions of his grandson, Ivan IV.

The modern coronation style, introducing "European-style" elements, replaced the previous "crowning" ceremony and was first used for Catherine I in 1724. Since tsarist Russia claimed to be the "Third Rome" and the successor to Byzantium, the Russian rite was designed to link its rulers and prerogatives to those of the so-called "Second Rome" (Constantinople).

While months or even years could pass between the initial accession of the sovereign and the performance of this ritual, church policy held that the monarch must be anointed and crowned according to the Orthodox rite to have a successful tenure. As the church and state were essentially one in Imperial Russia, this service invested the tsars with political legitimacy; however, this was not its only intent. It was equally perceived as conferring a genuine spiritual benefit that mystically wedded sovereign to subjects, bestowing divine authority upon the new ruler. As such, it was similar in purpose to other European coronation ceremonies from the medieval period.

Even when the imperial capital was located at St. Petersburg (1713–1728, 1732–1917), Russian coronations were always held in Moscow at the Cathedral of the Dormition in the Kremlin. The last coronation service in Russia was held on 26 May 1896 for Nicholas II and his wife Alexandra Feodorovna, who would be the final emperor and empress of Russia. The Russian Imperial regalia survived the subsequent Russian Revolution and the Soviet period, and are currently on exhibit at the Diamond Fund in the Kremlin Armoury.

== List of emperors ==
Name	Lifespan	Reign start	Reign end	Notes	Family	Image
Peter I: Пётр Вели́кий Peter the Great	9 June 1672 — 8 February 1725	as a tsar: 2 June 1682 as an emperor: 2 November 1721	8 February 1725	Son of Alexis I and Natalya Naryshkina; Younger brother of Sophia Alekseyevna, Feodor III and Ivan V He ruled jointly with Ivan V Regarded as one of the greatest Russian monarchs	Romanov	
Catherine I: Екатери́на I Алексе́евна	15 April 1684 — 17 May 1727	8 February 1725	17 May 1727	Second wife of Peter I	Skavronsky (by birth); Romanov (by marriage)	
Peter II: Пётр II Алексеевич	23 October 1715 — 30 January 1730	18 May 1727	30 January 1730	Grandson of Peter I via the murdered Tsesarevich Alexei. Last of the direct male Romanov line.	Romanov	
Anna: Анна Иоанновна	7 February 1693 — 28 October 1740	15 February 1730	28 October 1740	Daughter of Ivan V	Romanov	
Ivan VI: Иван VI	23 August 1740 — 16 July 1764	28 October 1740	6 December 1741	Great-grandson of Ivan V Deposed as a baby, imprisoned and later murdered	Mecklenburg-Brunswick-Romanov	
Elizabeth: Елизаве́та	29 December 1709 — 5 January 1762	6 December 1741	5 January 1762	Daughter of Peter I and Catherine I, usurped the throne.	Romanov	
Peter III: Пётр III Фёдорович	21 February 1728 — 17 July 1762	9 January 1762	9 July 1762	Grandson of Peter I Son of Anna; Nephew of Elizabeth; Murdered	Holstein-Gottorp-Romanov	
Catherine II: Екатерина Алексеевна Catherine the Great	2 May 1729 — 17 November 1796	9 July 1762	17 November 1796	Wife of Peter III	Ascania (by birth); Holstein-Gottorp-Romanov (by marriage)	
Paul I: Па́вел I Петро́вич	1 October 1754 — 23 March 1801	17 November 1796	23 March 1801	Son of Peter III and Catherine II; Assassinated	Holstein-Gottorp-Romanov	
Alexander I: Александр Павлович	23 December 1777 — 1 December 1825	23 March 1801	1 December 1825	Son of Paul I and Maria Feodorovna (Sophie Dorothea of Württemberg); First Romanov King of Poland and Grand Prince of Finland	Holstein-Gottorp-Romanov	
Nicholas I: Николай I Павлович	6 July 1796 — 2 March 1855	1 December 1825	2 March 1855	Son of Paul I and Maria Feodorovna (Sophie Dorothea of Württemberg); Younger brother of Alexander I	Holstein-Gottorp-Romanov	
Alexander II: Алекса́ндр II Никола́евич	29 April 1818 — 13 March 1881	2 March 1855	13 March 1881	Son of Nicholas I and Alexandra Feodorovna (Charlotte of Prussia); Nephew of Alexander I Assassinated	Holstein-Gottorp-Romanov	
Alexander III: Алекса́ндр III Алекса́ндрович	10 March 1845 — 1 November 1894	13 March 1881	1 November 1894	Son of Alexander II and Maria Alexandrovna (Marie of Hesse and by Rhine)	Holstein-Gottorp-Romanov	
Nicholas II: Николай II Алекса́ндрович	18 May 1868 — 17 July 1918	1 November 1894	15 March 1917	Son of Alexander III and Maria Feodorovna (Dagmar of Denmark); Abdicated the throne during the February Revolution; Murdered by the Bolsheviks	Holstein-Gottorp-Romanov	

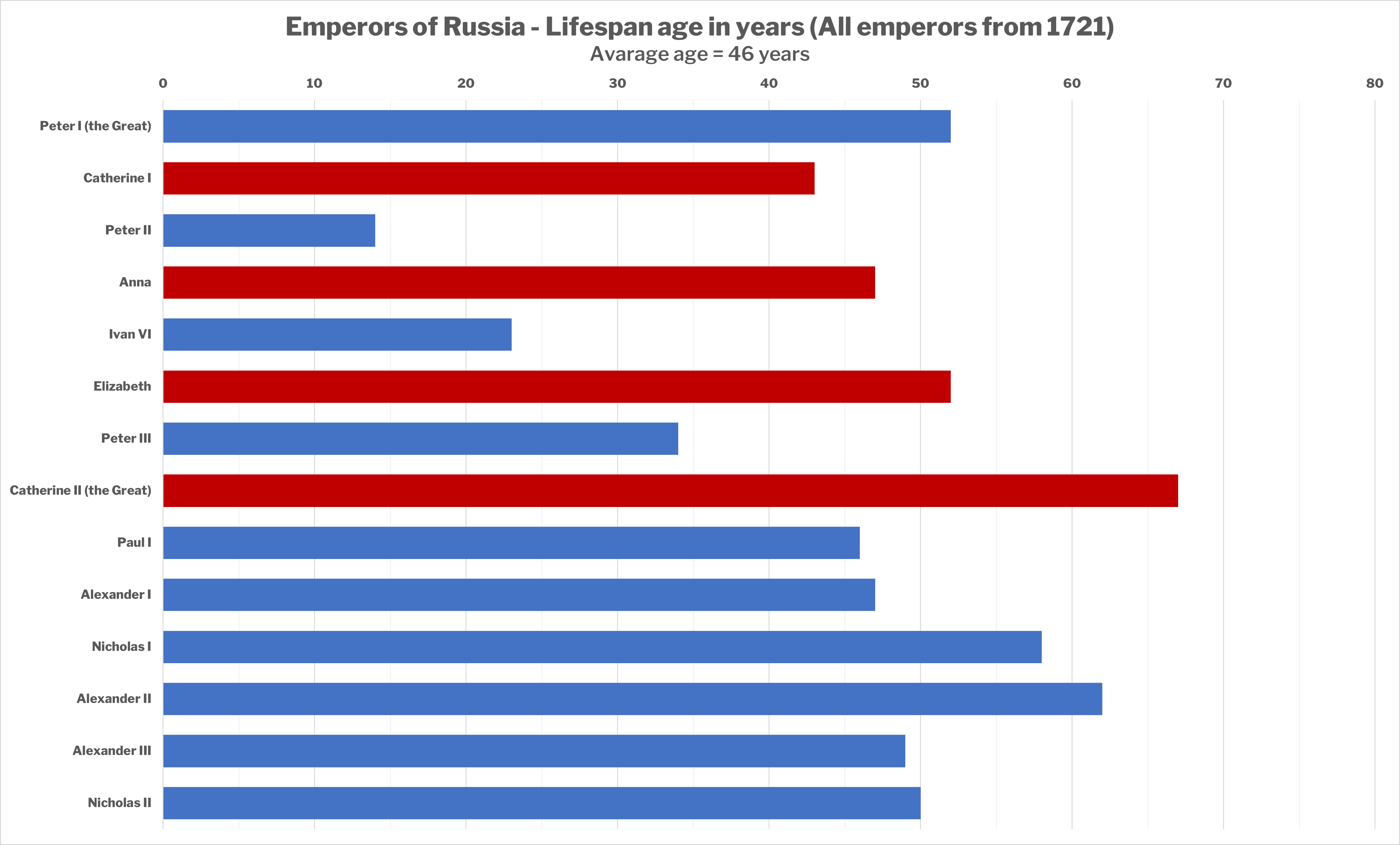
Emperors of Russia – lifespan age (1721–1918)

Nicholas II abdicated in favour of his brother, Grand Duke Michael Alexandrovich, but the next day, after a nominal reign of only 18 hours, "Emperor Michael II" declined power, ending dynastic rule in Russia.

See List of leaders of Russia for the continuation of leadership.

== See also ==
- Church reform of Peter the Great
- Digest of Laws of the Russian Empire
- Government reform of Peter the Great
- Government reform of Alexander I
- His Imperial Majesty's Own Chancellery
- Imperial Crown of Russia
- Judicial system of the Russian Empire
- Most Holy Synod
- Patriarch of Moscow and all Rus'
- Pauline Laws
- Rulers of Russia family tree
- Russian Constitution of 1906
- State Council (Russian Empire)
- Table of Ranks
