= Spinel of the Great Imperial Crown =

Large uncut gemstone which tops the Great Imperial Crown of Russia

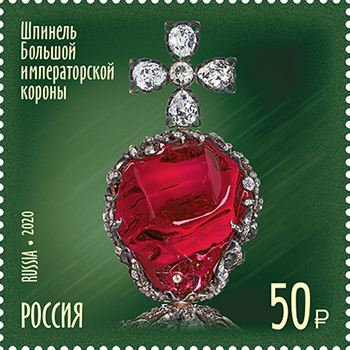
Stamp featuring the Spinel of the Great Imperial Crown, from the 2020 Russian series “Treasures of Russia: 100th Anniversary of the Gokhran of Russia”

The Spinel of the Great Imperial Crown (Russian: Шпинель Большой императорской короны) or Menshikov Ruby (Russian: Рубин Меншикова) is a historical gemstone, a red spinel which tops the Great Imperial Crown of Russia from the 18th century to the present day. It is the largest of the seven historic gems of the Diamond Fund of the Russian Federation.

The stone is not cut, but polished, and there is a through hole drilled in the lower part. A small pin, capped on both sides with small diamonds, is inserted into it. According to the 1898 inventory, the weight of the gemstone is 389 old carats; in 1922, the stone was weighed together with the pin and diamonds covering the hole, the weight was 414.3 metric carats. When Alexander Fersman compiled the Diamond Fund catalogue in 1924, he estimated the net weight of spinel, excluding the pin, as approximately equal to 402 metric carats; later sources also cite the figure of 398.72 metric carats.

== History ==
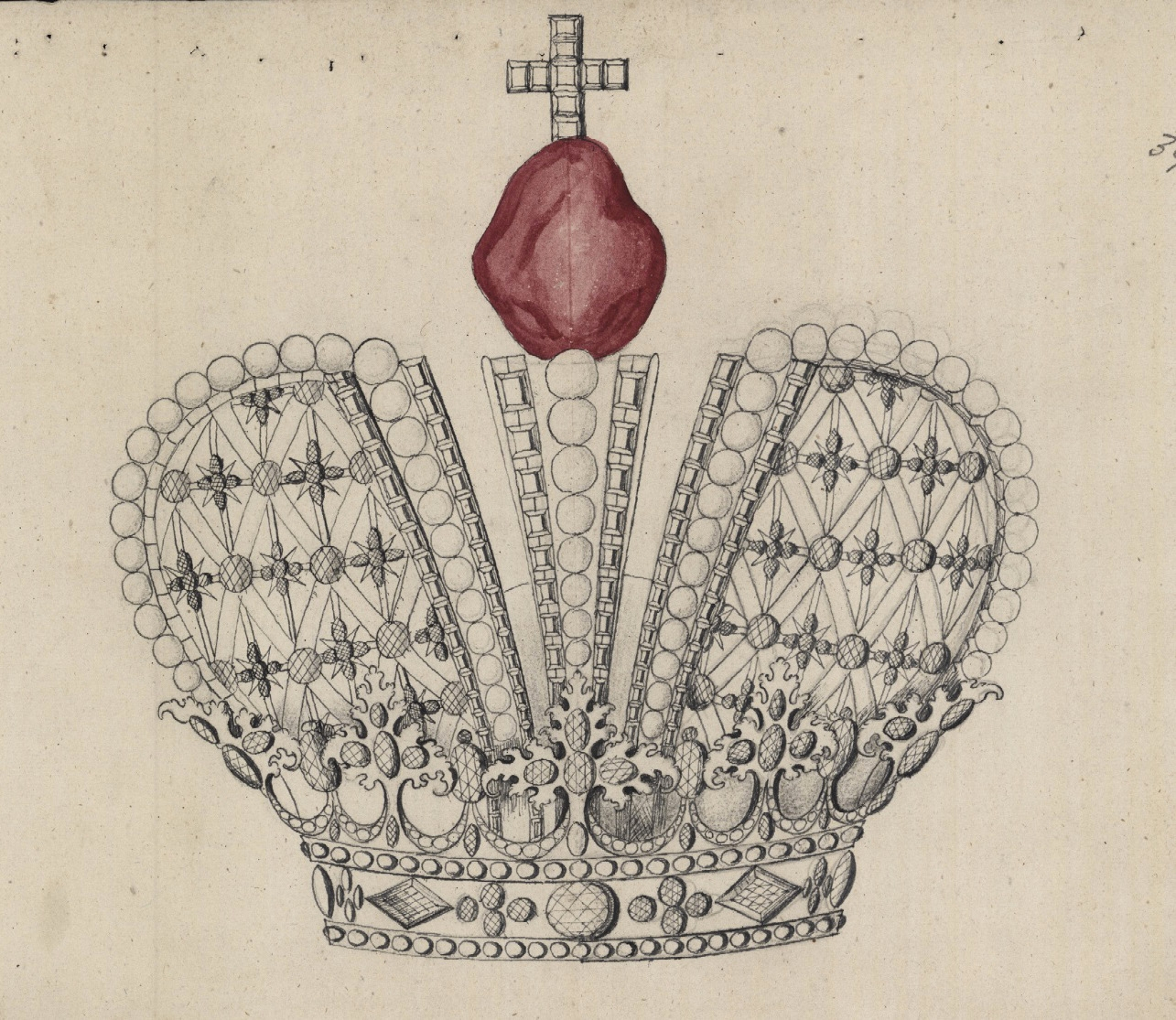
Drawing of a crown from the file on preparations for the coronation of Emperor Peter II

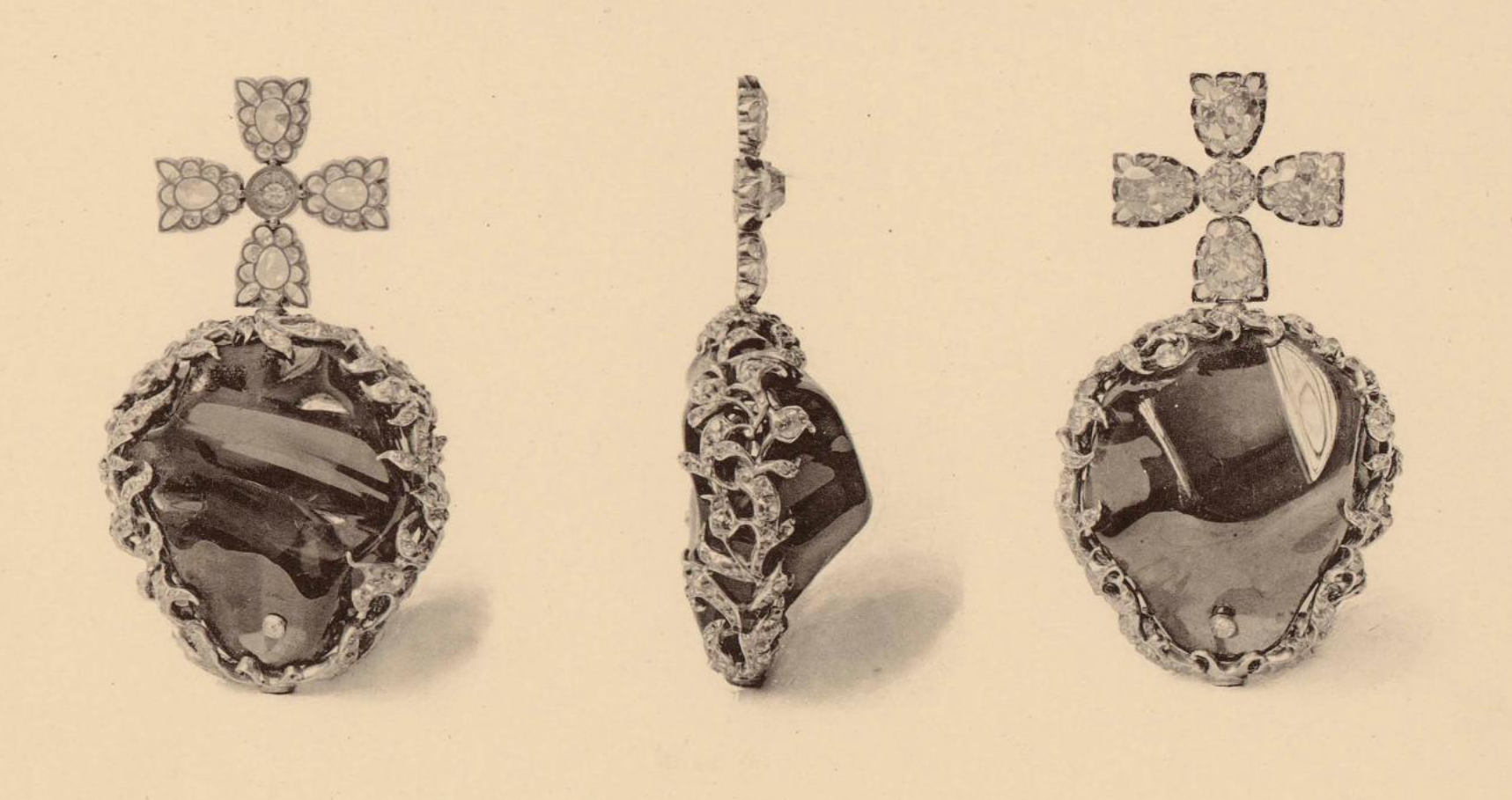
Image of the Spinel of the Great Imperial Crown from the Fersman catalogue

The large red gemstone adorned several great imperial crowns of Russian emperors and empresses created in the 18th century. It is believed that it was one and the same stone that was used to decorate the next crown after the previous one was dismantled. The first information about it dates back to 1702, when the retired Nerchinsk captain of fifty Yan Istopnikov, being at the head of the state caravan in China, exchanged “a red lal stone, weighing 19 zolotniks and half a zolotnik” for 8,000 liang. Prince Alexander Menshikov, in his letter from Kiev dated May 12, 1705, gave instructions to buy the stone from Istopnikov, reimbursing him for the money spent and giving him a bonus of 1,000 rubles. On October 5, 1705, Istopnikov gave the stone to the Department of Siberian Affairs and received 9,000 rubles from the money of the Department of Siberian Affairs and the Ingermanland Chancellery, but the stone was “not in the record” in the income books for 1705 and 1706.

While already under investigation for embezzlement, Prince Matvei Gagarin testified that in 1705, Yan Istopnikov “revealed a lal stone” to the head of the Department of Siberian Affairs, Prince Fyodor Romodanovsky. Romodanovsky sent the stone with Gagarin to Peter I, and the prince showed it to the tsar in Poland, in Grodno. Peter I “deigned to accept that stone from me himself”. In 1721, the stone was already in the possession of Prince Alexander Menshikov. Gagarin did not know why there were no records of this in the income books, because the head of the Department of Siberian Affairs in 1705 was Prince Fyodor Romodanovsky.

In 1724, Catherine I was crowned. After the crown made for the coronation was brought to Moscow, the original top in the form of a golden monde studded with diamonds was replaced with a large red stone. Friedrich Wilhelm von Bergholz wrote in his diary that on March 30, 1724, the imperial crown was shown to him and several others by secret cabinet secretary Alexei Makarov, and at that time there was already “a very expensive and incredibly large ruby, almost a finger's length” on the top. This stone was received from Prince Menshikov; in 1727 Menshikov testified in a case about his financial misconduct, that for this Peter I had allowed him, by oral decree, not to return 10 thousand rubles taken from the College of War. The coronation ceremony of the Empress took place on May 7. In the “Description of the Coronation of Her Majesty Empress Catherine Alekseevna” the stone is described as follows:

In the whole of this crown only one colored stone was visible, that is, a straight oriental ruby or yakhont of very pure color, larger than a pigeon's egg, and therefore by far the most valuable of all rubies known to this day.

By June 9 the crown had already been dismantled, and its frame was transferred to the Workshop and Armory Chamber. The Russian State Archive of Ancient Acts (RSAAA) contains several drawings that, according to most experts, depict the crown of Catherine I, despite the fact that they are among the documents on the coronation of Peter II, since according to textual descriptions, the crown of Peter II looked different.

The red stone from the top of the crown returned to Prince Menshikov. Boris Kurakin later wrote about Menshikov: “And he had a particularly famous thing - a red yakhont, of great value, which, due to its size, weight and color, was considered unique in Europe”. After Menshikov was arrested on September 8, 1727, as a result of the work of the investigative commission of the Supreme Privy Council, the gemstone was confiscated. On September 11, Pyotr Moshkov announced the “large red lal stone” at a meeting of the Supreme Privy Council and handed it over to Vice-Chancellor Baron Andrei Osterman “for delivery to His Imperial Majesty”. Thus the stone ended up in the state treasury.

With the rise to power of Peter II in May 1727, the need arose to create new regalia for the coronation ceremony. Since the crown of Catherine I had long been dismantled by this time, at a meeting of the Supreme Privy Council on October 2, 1727, a decision was made to “make the crown again”. The creation of this crown, like the previous one, was entrusted to a group of court jewelers, headed by master Samson Larionov. It was topped with a cross of nine “quadrangular” diamonds of Greek cut, fixed on a huge lal (as red and pink spinels and tourmalines were called in Russia at that time) worth 60 thousand rubles - most likely the same one that crowned the crown of Catherine I. From February 1728 to the end of December 1729, the crown of Peter II was kept in the Workshop Chamber. The last mention of the crown dates from December 31, 1729, when it was issued from the chamber to the hof-intendant Peter Moshkov in preparation for the emperor's wedding. In early January 1730 came Osterman's decree “to make for the marriage of His Imperial Majesty a crown of diamond things that are removed from the great and lesser crowns”. However, the wedding did not take place due to the death of the emperor on January 19, 1730.

For the crown of Anna Ioannovna, which was made in great haste, the craftsmen were given three large lals, including the one that was in the crown of Peter II, and it has not yet been possible to establish which of these three stones was ultimately used. In January 1742, when the crown was being transported from Moscow to St. Petersburg, a detailed description of it was made, and at that time, under the cross there was a large, but relatively cheap stone, valued at only a thousand rubles. It serves as the top of the crown of Anna Ioannovna to this day and, as a modern examination has established, is a red tourmaline. It is possible that this stone replaced the original top after the coronation, but this assumption has not yet been confirmed or refuted by documents. Worth 60 thousand rubles, the lal appears again in the Great Crown of Elizabeth Petrovna, made for her coronation in St. Petersburg in 1742. This crown was made by a team of craftsmen led by Johann Heinrich Zart. They were mostly foreign jewellers, but they also included a group of resident Russian craftsmen headed by Samson Larionov. After the coronation, the regalia were put on public display. An eyewitness of this, Yakov Markevich, wrote about the crown in his diary that it had “the largest diamond at the bottom worth 25 thousand rubles, and under the cross a red lal worth 60 thousand rubles”. Soon after the coronation, it was apparently dismantled - it is reliably known that this was done with the orb.

For the coronation ceremony of Catherine II in 1762, it was necessary to make the great imperial crown and orb again (the scepter was traditionally taken from the Workshop and Armory Chamber). The goldsmith Georg Friedrich Eckart and the “diamondsmith” Jeremie Pauzie took part in the creation of the crown. The latter was tasked with framing the crown with stones. The “Description of the diamonds, large lal and pearls that are in the crown, number, weight and price with all expenses” from September 22, 1762 has been preserved. The crown contained 58 “the largest diamonds”, 4,878 diamonds “of various sizes”, 75 “large pearls” and 1 “large lal” weighing 389½ carats – apparently, again the stone that had already crowned the crowns of Catherine I, Peter II and Elizabeth Petrovna. Emperor Paul I did not order a new crown for his coronation, but used his mother’s, and since then the Great Imperial Crown of Catherine II has become the hereditary regalia of the Romanovs. In 1838, in the inventory of crown items, the stone under the cross was called a “large ruby”, and in the inventory of 1865 it was already listed as “an irregularly shaped spinel ruby, worth 100,000 rubles”. Since 1967, the crown, and along with it the historical spinel, has been an exhibit of the Diamond Fund.

== Versions of origin ==
It is a common misconception that the Spinel of the Great Imperial Crown is the stone that Nikolai Spathari bought in Beijing during his embassy to the Qing Empire. Originally, it refer to the stone that tops Anna Ioannovna's crown. Back in 1807, Alexei Malinovsky, who mistakenly believed that this crown was made for the coronation of Catherine I and was subsequently used at the coronations of Peter II and Anna Ioannovna, wrote about it:

According to the expense books of the Chamber Archive, the crown of Empress Catherine I contained a greatest size and excellent quality lal, which was taken into the cabinet by order of Empress Anna Ioannovna. This lal is the same one that was bought in 1676 for a very significant sum at that time, by order of Tsar Alexei Mikhailovich, in Beijing by Nikolai Spathari, the Russian ambassador to the Chinese Bogda Khan Kangxi.

Various publications in pre-revolutionary Russia linked this statement with the stone that has been under the cross of Anna Ioannovna's crown since 1732; this version was generally accepted. In the 20th century, the Soviet researcher Alexander Fersman expressed doubt that it was possible to establish which of the two surviving precious tops of the Russian imperial crowns is the Spathari's stone and which was the Menshikov's stone, but since the mid-20th century the Spathari's Lal has been identified with the Spinel of the Great Imperial Crown. In fact, both stones, from the crown of Anna Ioannovna and from the Great Imperial Crown, are too large to be the Spathari’s stone, since it weighed a little over eleven zolotniks, i.e. only slightly more than 47 grams or 240 carats. Spathari's Lal may have once topped the crown of Anna Ioannovna, but in that case he was removed from the crown in 1732 and “taken into the cabinet”, as Alexei Malinovsky originally pointed out.

There is also a version that the stone was acquired on behalf of Menshikov in the Netherlands.

== Mineralogical nature ==
Sources from the times of the Russian Empire differ in the definition of the stone that topped the great imperial crowns of Russian emperors and empresses: some of them define it as a true ruby, a precious red corundum (“oriental ruby”, “yakhont”, “red yakhont”), and others define it as “lal”, that is, spinel or tourmaline (pink and red spinels and tourmalines were not yet distinguished at that time). Already in the 19th century, the definition “spinel ruby” was found in inventories, but only the examination of Academician Fersman reliably established that the largest of the seven historical stones of the Diamond Fund is indeed a spinel.

== Cultural significance ==
=== Literature ===
The Menshikov Ruby is mentioned in the historical novels The Hunt of Peter II by Yuri Vigor and The Dishonored Bride by Margarita Anisimkova, as well as in the short story The Menshikov Passion by Mikhail Kheifets, and plays an important role in the plot of the novel The Fourth Ruby from the children's fantasy series Section 13 by the American writer James R. Hannibal.

== See also ==
- List of individual gemstones
