= Monomakh's Cap =

Relic of the Russian tsars and Grand Dukes

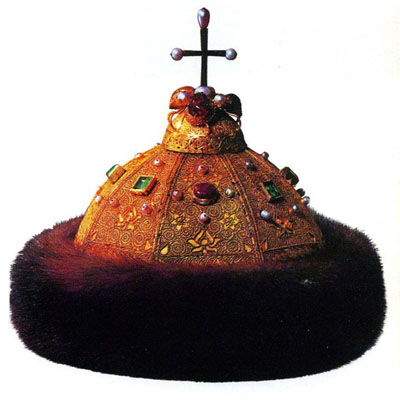

Details
- Country: Russia
- Made: XIII-XIV century
- Arches: None
- Material: Gold
- Cap: Velvet and sable
- Notable stones: Rubies, sapphires, emeralds, pearls
- Successors: Imperial Crown of Russia

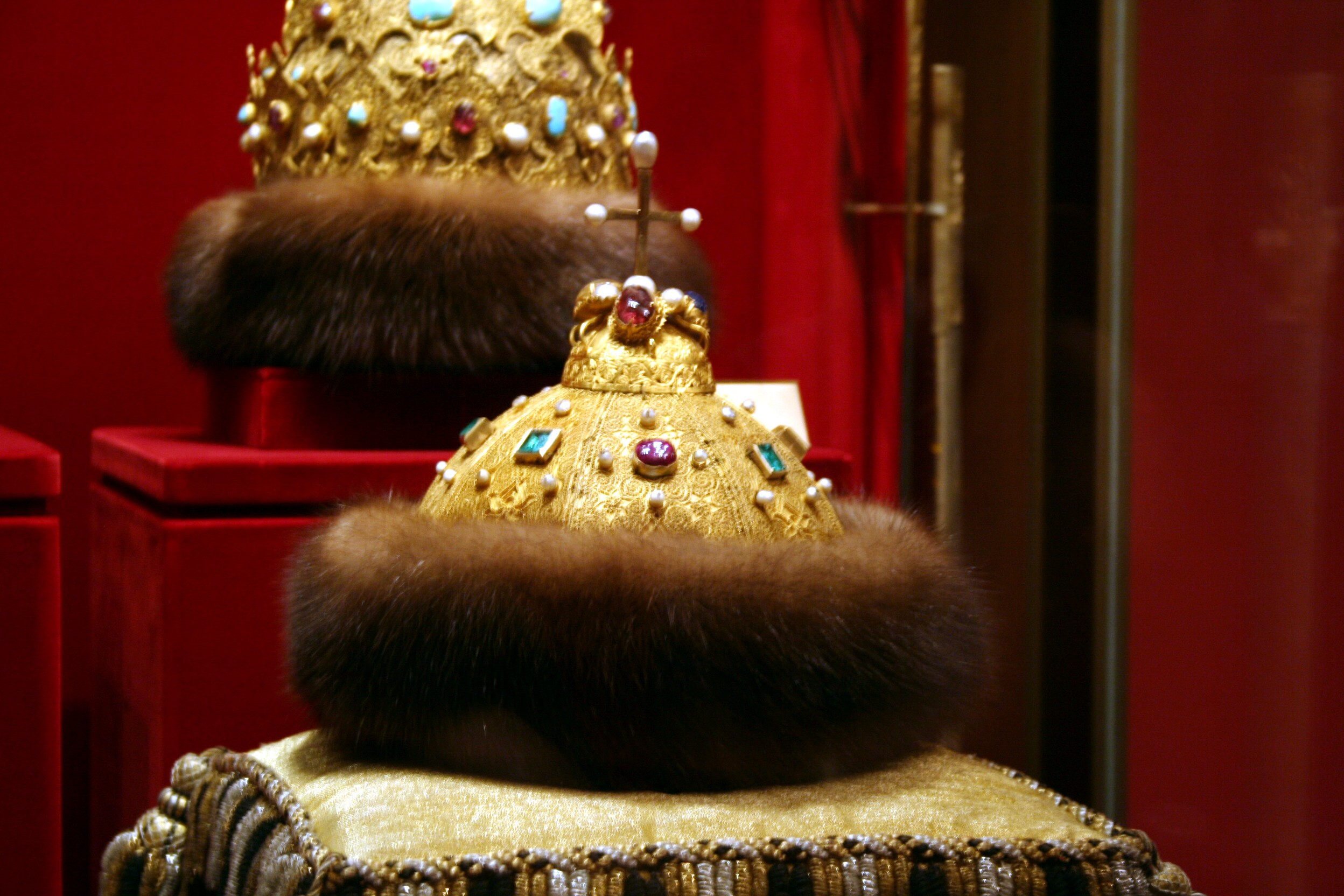
Monomakh's Cap in the foreground and Kazan Cap in the background

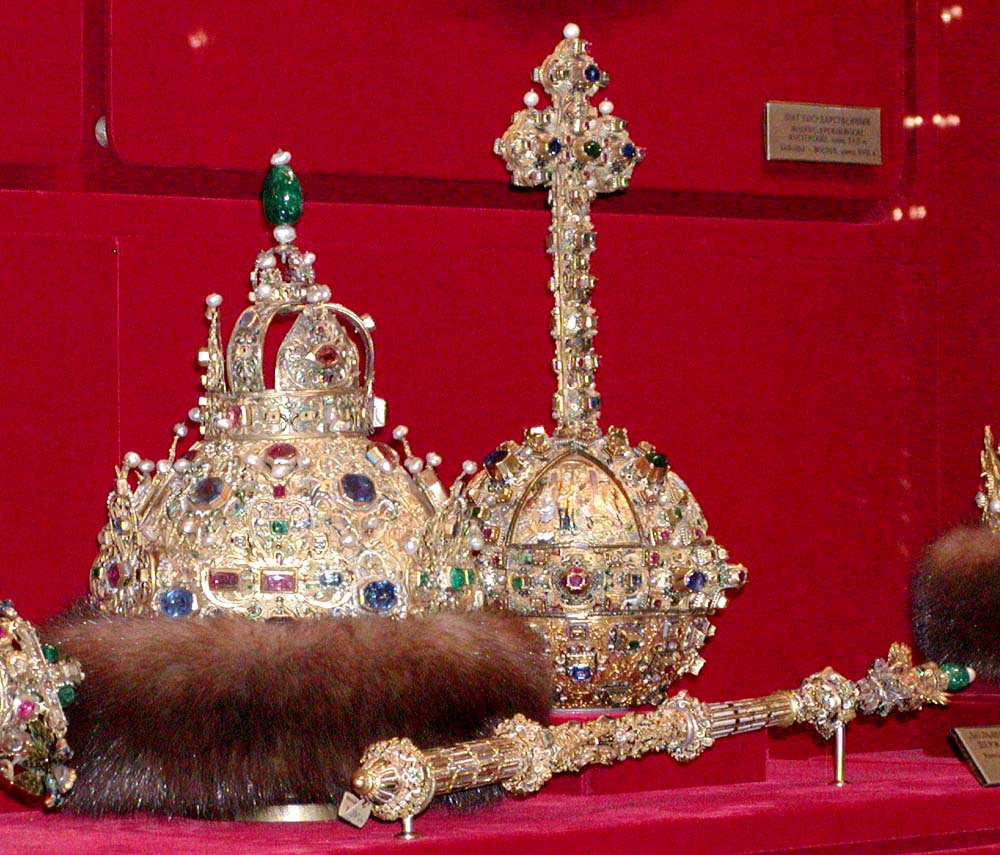
Russian regalia used prior to the Great Imperial Crown. The crown is styled after the Monomakh Cap, and was made for Tsar Michael Fyodorovich by Kremlin masters in 1627. The orb and sceptre are of Western-European origin and may have been given to Tsar Boris Godunov in 1604.

Monomakh's Cap (Russian: шапка Мономаха, romanized: shapka Monomakha), also called the Golden Cap (Russian: шапка Золотая, romanized: shapka Zolotaya), is a chief relic of the Muscovite Grand Princes and Russian Tsars. It is a symbol-crown of the Russian autocracy, and is the oldest of the crowns currently exhibited at the Imperial treasury section of the Kremlin Armoury. Monomakh's Cap is an early 14th-century gold filigree skullcap composed of eight sectors, elaborately ornamented with a scrolled gold overlay, inlaid with precious stones (ruby and emerald) and pearls, and trimmed with sable. The cap is surmounted by a simple gold cross with pearls at each of its extremities.

== Origin ==
The main hypothesis sees the Cap as originating in ancient Moscow. One alternative account classifies it as of Central Asian origin (from the ethnological or cultural point of view); this has led some modern scholars to view the crown as a gift from Uzbeg Khan of the Golden Horde (r. 1313–1341) to his brother-in-law, Grand Prince of Moscow Ivan Kalita (r. 1325–1340) during Mongol-Tatar yoke era after the Mongol invasion of Kievan Rus' of 1223-1241. Boris Uspensky (1996) in particular argues that the Tatar headgear was originally used in coronation ceremonies to signify the Muscovite ruler's subordination to the khan. According to Sergey Solovyov (1879) "after the death of Ivan Kalita all Russian princes traveled to the Horde... and the Khan announced the eldest son of Kalita, Simeon, the Grand Prince of Vladimir".

After Muscovy overcame the period of feudal fragmentation, and Ivan III of Moscow and Vladimir (r. 1462–1505) asserted his position as successor to the Roman emperors, there arose a legend that the cap had been presented by the Byzantine emperor Constantine IX Monomachus (r. 1042–1055) to his grandson Vladimir Monomakh, the traditional founder in 1108 of the city of Vladimir and patrilineal ancestor of Ivan III. In the early part of the 16th century The Tale of the Princes of Vladimir elaborated the legend, which reinforced the 15th-century claims for the "Moscow as the Third Rome" political theory.

The crown became known as "Monomakh's Cap", the term first recorded in a Muscovite document from 1518. However the fact that Constantine IX Monomachus died 50 years before the coronation of Vladimir Monomakh makes the attribution a mere legend. The first version of the orient origin of the Cap (Uzbeg Khan) was suggested by George Vernadsky. Vernadsky was pointing to an interesting fact that according to Paul Pelliot Özbäg can be interpreted as a freeman (maître de sa personne).

Professor M. G. Kramarovsky, who worked at the Hermitage Museum and was specifically interested in the origin of the cap, remarks that according to the technology of the headgear, the cap originated in the 14th or 15th century - either in the Volga cities or in Crimea, where the school of Golden Horde filigree had developed. According to Aleksandr Andreevich Spitsyn (1858-1931), possibly the cap was initially topped with the similar cross of the Jani Beg crown, however account of the German ambassador of the Holy Roman Emperor Maximilian I, Sigismund von Herberstein (known for his Notes on Muscovite Affairs, published in 1549) does not support that view.

After Ivan the Terrible had himself crowned the first Russian Tsar with this headgear in 1547, the Polish king asked Ivan to explain the meaning of his new title. To that Ivan replied that whoever is crowned with Monomakh's Cap is traditionally called a tsar, because it was a gift from a tsar (i.e., Constantine IX) who had sent the Metropolitan of Ephesus to Kiev to crown Vladimir Monomakh with this cap. Ivan was presumably not aware that at the time of Constantine IX Monomachus' death, Vladimir Monomakh was only two years old and he was not the Kievan sovereign yet.

The Monomakh Cap was last used in the dual coronation of Ivan V and Peter I of Russia in 1682, though it was carried in the coronation procession thereafter. After Peter I (Peter the Great) assumed the title of emperor in 1721, a new western-style crown was fashioned and used in the coronation of the empress-consort Catherine in 1724.

== See also ==
- Caps of the Russian tsardom (ru:Шапки Русского царства)
- Jericho's caps of Russian tsars (ru:Шапки ерихонские русских царей) – royal parade helms
- Russian Imperial Crown
- Muscovy Crown
- Holy Crown of Hungary
