= Jérémie Pauzié =

Genevan jeweler (1716–1779)

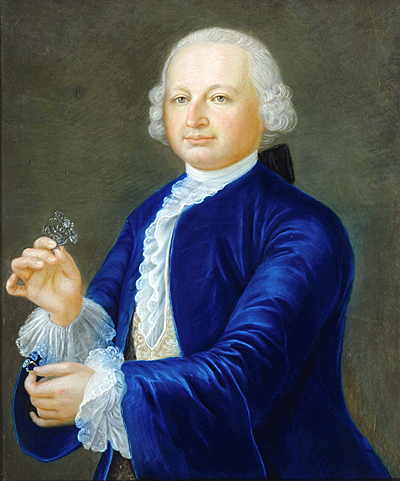
- Portrait, 1762
- Born: 6 December 1716; Geneva, Republic of Geneva
- Died: 30 November 1779 (aged 62); Geneva, Republic of Geneva
- Occupations: Diamond jeweler; goldsmith
- Known for: Imperial crown of Russia

Jérémie Pauzié (French pronunciation: [ʒeʁemi pozje]; 6 December 1716 – 30 November 1779) was a Genevan diamond jeweler, artist and memoirist, known for his work for the Russian Imperial court and the Imperial crown of Russia, which he created with the court's jeweler Georg Friedrich Ekart.

Throughout his working life (1740–1764) Pauzié, who held the title Principal Diamond Expert and Court Jeweller, made jewellery and gifts for the Russian nobility, courtiers, and the Imperial family. Later he recorded his life in the book of Memoirs of a Court Jeweller Pauzié, published by the Russian history journal Russkaya starina in 1870.

== Biography ==
Pauzié studied for seven years with Benedict Gravero in Saint Petersburg, and in the end of the 1730s started his own jewellery workshop. Hs speciality was work with diamond and other jewels, he did not have much experience with noble metals. For work on metals, he hired subcontractors. In this period, Pauzié mainly produced jewellery for local noblemen, and was rarely admitted to the Imperial court.

In 1761, Empress Elizabeth died, and Ekart, who was the chief court jeweller, was charged in making a funeral crown. His solution proved to be suboptimal, and Pauzié was asked to repair the crown. After that, he got access to the court, and was considered to be Ekart's chief rival. When the reign of Catherine the Great started, Ekart was charged with making the Imperial Crown, and Pauzié decorated it with jewels, against Ekart's will. In 1764, Pauzié left Saint Petersburg and went back to Switzerland, where in 1770 he became the citizen of Geneva.

== The Great Imperial Crown ==
Pauzié was commissioned to work with Ekart, the Russian Imperial court's jeweler, to create the Great Imperial Crown of Russia, which was created for the coronation of Catherine the Great in 1762. The crown was made in the style of classicism and constructed of two gold and silver half spheres, representing the eastern and western Roman empires, divided by a foliate garland and fastened with a low hoop. The crown contains 75 pearls and 4,936 Indian diamonds forming laurel and oak leaves, the symbols of power and strength, and is surmounted by a 398.62 carat ruby spinel that previously belonged to the Empress Elizabeth, and a diamond cross.

After Catherine the Great's coronation the crown continued to be used as the coronation crown of all Romanov emperors, till the monarchy's abolition and the death of last Romanov, Nikolas II in 1918. It is considered to be one of the main treasures of the Romanov dynasty, and is now on display in the Moscow Kremlin Armoury Museum in Russia.

== Exhibitions and commercial use ==
His work formed part of the art jewellery exhibitions, including The Art of the Goldsmith & the Jeweler at A La Vieille Russie in New York (1968) and Carl Fabergé and Masters of Stone Carving: Gem Masterpieces of Russia at the Dormition Belfry of the Moscow Kremlin Museums in Moscow (2011). In 2013 the Jérémie Pauzié name was acquired by French luxury group Vendôme Private Trading.

== Bibliography ==
- «Culture» Discovery. Escape of the diamond master Pauzié. January, 2015
- Notes of the Court Jeweler Jeremie Posier [Pauzie] 1729-64, ed. A A Kunin, in Russkaya Starina, 1870
- Alexander Solodkoff, Orfèvrerie russe du XVIIe au XIXe siècle, 1981,
- A la Vieille Russie, The Art of the Goldsmith & the Jeweler, 1968, no. 174, illus. p. 76
- Sidler, Godefroy, Catalogue officiel du Musée de l'Ariana, Genève, Ville de Genève / Atar, 1905. 234 p., p. 126, n° 47
- Eisler, William. The Dassiers of Geneva: 18th-century European medallists. Volume II: Dassier and sons: an artistic enterprise in Geneva, Switzerland and Europe, 1733-1759. Lausanne, 2005., pp. 361– 362, fig. 47, repr. n/b
- Golay, Laurent. Alexandra Karouova et al.. Suisse-Russie. Des siècles d'amour et d'oubli, 1680- 2006[cat. exp. Lausanne, Musée historique, 17.02 - 21.05.2006]. Lausanne, Musée historique de Lausanne; Benteli, 2006., p. 55, repr. coul.
- Jeffares, Neil. Dictionary of pastellists before 1800. London, Unicorn Press, 2006., p. 622, non repr. (sous Anonyme, Ecole suisse)

Edition critique introduite et commentée du mémoire de Jérémie Pauzié, joaillier à la Cour de Russie de 1730 à 1763 / Mélanie Draveny, Mémoire de licence dactyl. lettres Genève, 2004
