= Imperial Crown of Russia =

Diamond crown used by the Russian monarchs

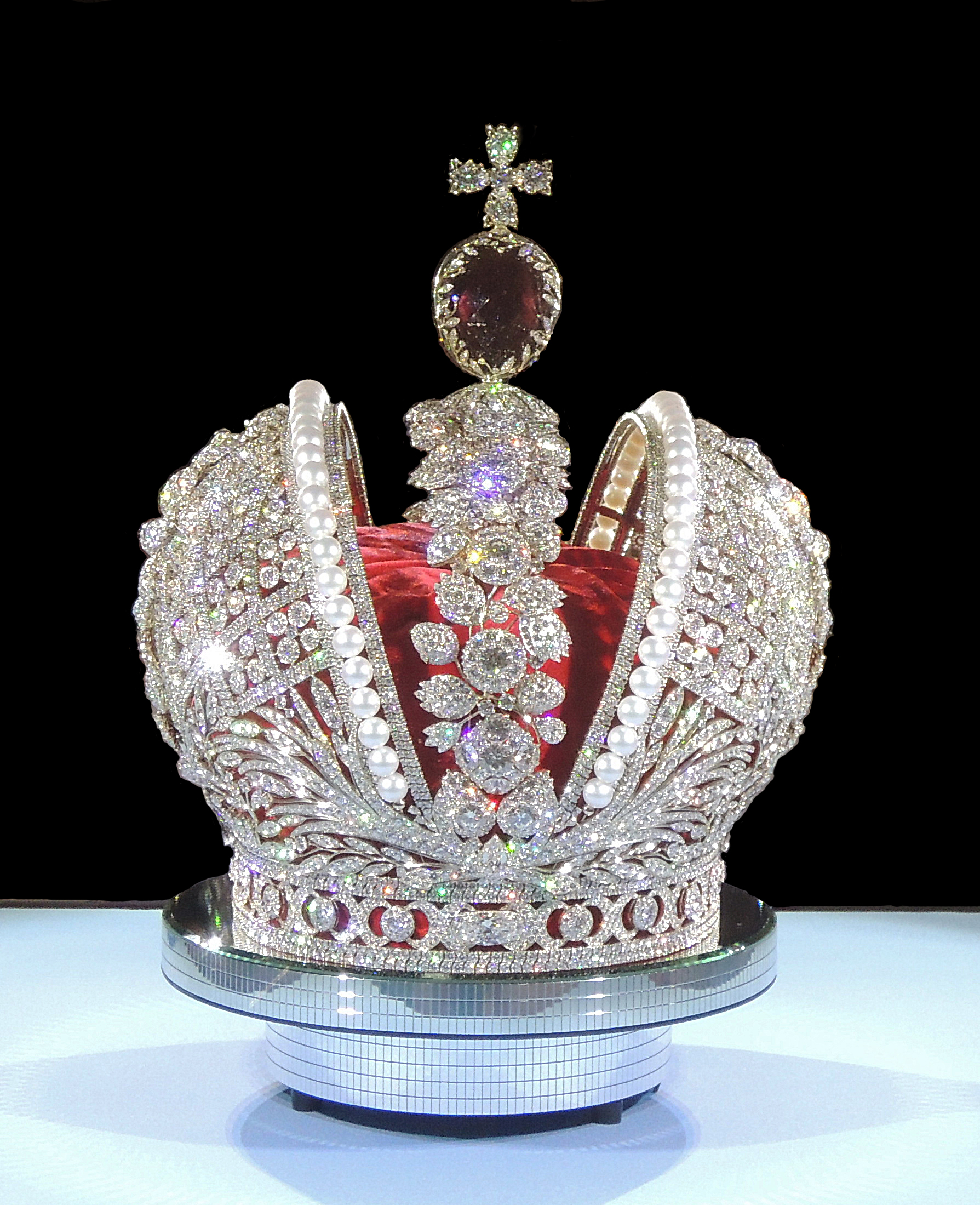
- Modern replica using real gems and white gold

Heraldic depictions

Details
- Country: Russian Empire
- Made: 1762
- Owner: State Diamond Fund
- Weight: 1.994 kg (4.4 lb)
- Arches: 2
- Material: Silver
- Cap: Red velvet
- Notable stones: 4,936 diamonds 74 pearls 1 red spinel
- Predecessors: Monomakh's Cap

The Imperial Crown of Russia (Russian: Императорская корона России), also known as the Great Imperial Crown of the Russian Empire (Russian: Большая императорская корона Российской Империи), was used for the coronation of the monarchs of Russia from 1762 until the Russian monarchy's abolition in 1917. The great imperial crown was first used in the coronation by Catherine the Great, and it was last worn at the coronation of Nicholas II. It was displayed prominently next to Nicholas II on a cushion at the State Opening of the Russian Duma inside the Winter Palace in St. Petersburg in 1906. It survived the 1917 revolution and ensuing civil war and is currently on display in Moscow at the Kremlin Armoury's State Diamond Fund.

== Background ==
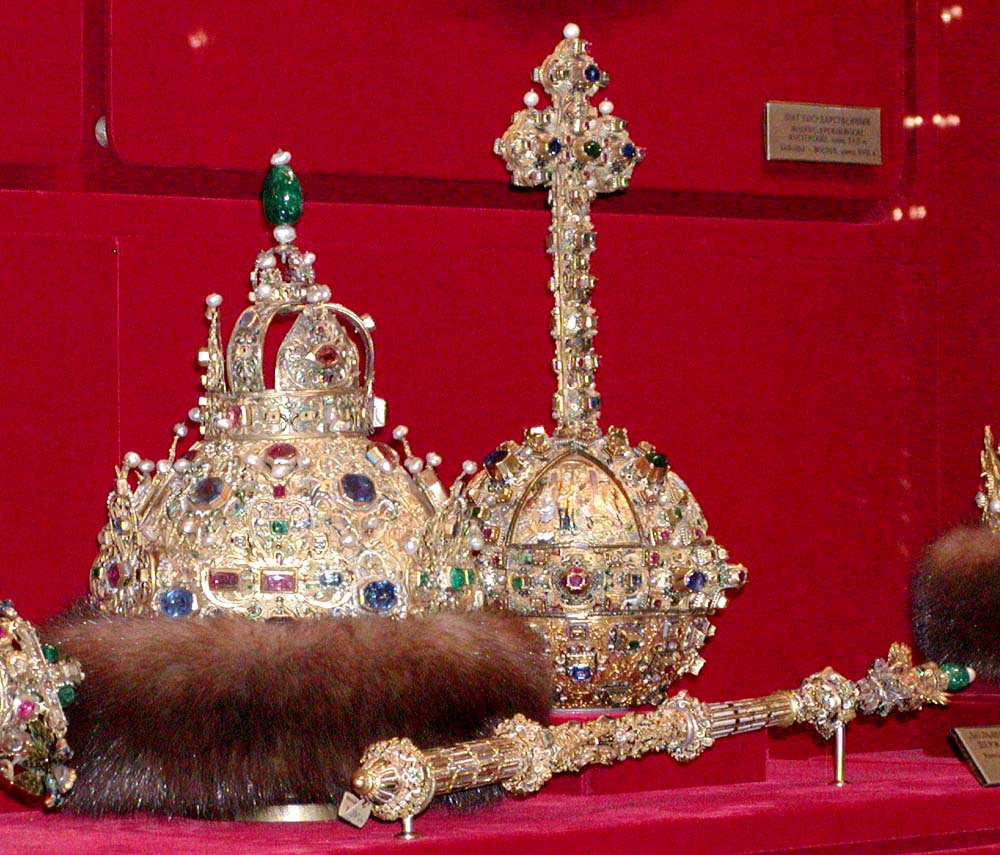
Russian regalia used prior to the creation of the great imperial crown

By 1613, when Michael Romanov, the first Tsar of the Romanov Dynasty, was crowned, the Russian regalia included a pectoral cross, a golden chain, a barmas (wide ceremonial collar), the Crown of Monomakh, sceptre, and orb. Over the centuries, various Tsars had fashioned their own private crowns, modeled for the most part after the Crown of Monomakh, but these were for personal use and not for the coronation.

In 1719, Tsar Peter the Great founded the earliest version of what is now known as the Russian Federation's State Diamond Fund. Peter had visited other European nations, and introduced many innovations to Russia, one of which was the creation of a permanent fund (фонд) to house a collection of jewels that belonged not to the Romanov family, but to the Russian State. Peter placed all of the regalia in this fund and declared that the state holdings were inviolate and could not be altered, sold, or given away — and he also decreed that each subsequent Emperor or Empress should leave to the state a certain number of pieces acquired during their reign, for the permanent glory of the Russian Empire.

From this collection came a new set of regalia, including eventually the great imperial crown, to replace the Crown of Monomakh and other crowns used by earlier Russian Tsars and Grand Princes of Muscovy, as a symbol of the adoption of the new title of Emperor (1721).

== Manufacture ==
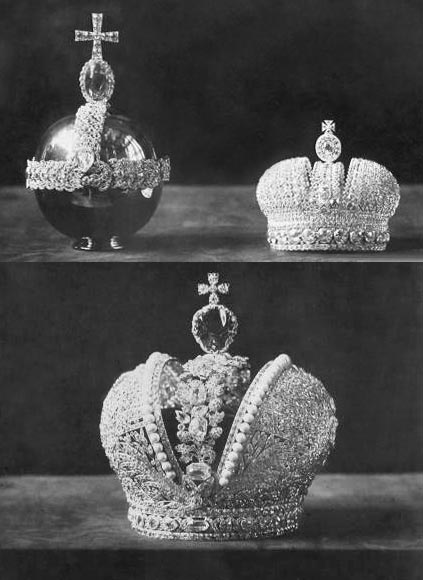
1896 image of the crown (at bottom)

The court jeweller Ekart and Jérémie Pauzié made the great imperial crown for the coronation of Catherine the Great in 1762. It is adorned with 4936 diamonds arranged in patterns across the entire surface of the crown. Bordering the edges of the "mitre" are a number of large white pearls. The crown is also decorated with one of the seven historic stones of the Russian Diamond Collection: a large precious red spinel weighing 398.72 carats (79.744 g), known as the Menshikov Ruby, which was bought in China in 1702 by the Nerchinsk merchant Yan Istopnikov. It is believed to be the second largest spinel in the world.

In formally adopting the Western term "Emperor" for the ruler of Russia, Peter the Great also adopted Western imperial symbols, including the form of the private crowns (Hauskrone) used by the Holy Roman Emperors (of which the only surviving example is the Austrian imperial crown of Rudolf II, the Imperial Crown of Austria), in which a circlet with eight fleur-de-lis surrounds a mitre with a high arch extending from the front to the back fleur-de-lis. Already in Austria some baroque representations of this type of crown found on statues of the saints had transformed the two halves of the mitre into two half-spheres, and this is the type of imperial crown used in Russia. Peter's widow and successor, Catherine I, was the first Russian ruler to wear this form of imperial crown.

In the imperial crown, these hemispheres are in open metalwork resembling basketwork with the edges of both the hemispheres bordered with a row of 37 very fine, large, white pearls. They rest on a circlet of nineteen diamonds, all averaging over 5 carats (1.0 g) in weight, the largest being the large Indian pear-shaped stone of 12 5/8 in front, set between two bands of diamonds above and below. Posier replaced the eight fleur-de-lis with four pairs of crossed palm branches, while the arch between them is made up of oaks leaves and acorns in small diamonds surrounding a number of large diamonds of various shapes and tints running from the front pair of crossed palms to the back pair of crossed palms, while the basketwork pattern of the two hemispheres are divided by two strips of similar oak leaves and acorns from the two side pairs of palm branches stretching up to the rows of large pearls on their borders. At the center and apex of the central arch is a diamond rosette of twelve petals from which rises a large red spinel, weighing 398.72 carats (79.744 grams), one of the seven historic stones of the Russian Diamond Collection, which was brought to Russia by Nicholas Spafary, the Russian envoy to China from 1675 to 1678. It is believed to be the second largest spinel in the world. This spinel, in turn, is surmounted by a cross of five diamonds, representing the Christian faith of the Sovereign, the God-given power of the monarchy and the supremacy of the divine order over earthly power. Except for the two rows of large white pearls the entire surface of the crown is covered with 4936 diamonds and weighs approximately nine pounds (by contrast, the Crown of Monomakh weighs only two pounds). It was unfinished in time for Catherine's coronation and the original colored stones (e.g., emeralds in the palm branches and laurel leaves) were replaced with diamonds for the coronation of Paul I in 1797. It was used at every subsequent coronation until that of Nicholas II in 1896 and was last worn in the imperial period at the State Opening of the Duma in 1906.

There was also a lesser imperial crown, very similar in style and workmanship, only smaller and entirely set with diamonds, made for Empress Maria Feodorovna, the consort of Paul I, and used for the coronation of the Tsarina. At the coronation of Nicholas II in 1896, the smaller crown was worn by Dowager Empress Maria Feodorovna. A second identical lesser imperial crown was made for the young Empress Alexandra Feodorovna to wear. Dowager Empresses outranked reigning Empress Consorts at the Russian Court.

In 1900, the workshop of Peter Carl Fabergé in St. Petersburg made a replica in miniature of the imperial regalia (the great imperial crown, the lesser imperial crown, the imperial orb and sceptre) out of silver, gold, diamonds, sapphires, and rubies, the whole set on a marble pedestal. The work is now in the collection of the Hermitage Museum.

== First World War, revolution and the Soviet period ==
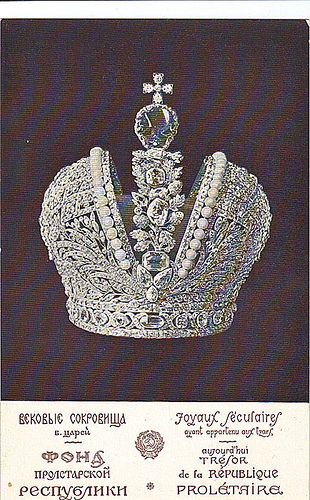
Postcard with the crown, c. 1924

In 1913, Agathon Fabergé, son of Peter Carl Fabergé of the House of Fabergé, the crown jewellers, recommended that the Imperial regalia be re-catalogued and overhauled. The tsar gave his approval and by July 1914, work on the Imperial orb and sceptre had been completed, and work was about to commence on the crowns. Rising tensions and the outbreak of the First World War put a stop to further work, and the regalia items were loaded into nine strong-boxes and sent from Saint Petersburg to Moscow for safekeeping. They were stored in the Kremlin Armoury. The crown remained there with the rest of the regalia during and after the February and October Revolutions in 1917.

In 1922, they were re-catalogued and transferred to the State Treasury. The crown and other pieces of jewellery and regalia were collected into the State Depository of Treasures, later the Diamond Fund, and discussions were carried out with French and British experts as to the possibility of selling off some of the crown jewels to raise foreign currency. The experts advised against selling such pieces as the crown, orb and sceptre, arguing that they were unlikely to attract their historic worth. Nevertheless, the crown jewels were exhibited in 1922 for two journalists of the New York Times, who later wrote:

'Here', says Begasheff [head of the jewellery commission], opening the box with hands that tremble ever so little despite his air of unconcern, 'is the crown of the Emperor, 32,800 carats of diamonds.'

'Is it heavy?'

'No', said one of the workmen, '5 pounds at most - try it,' and placed it straight away on my head.

== Heraldic use ==
Heraldic illustration

The imperial crown appeared on the National emblems of the Russian Empire — the Great Coat of arms (Большой государственный герб Российской Империи), the Medium Coat of Arms (Средний государственный герб Российской Империи), and the Lesser Coat of Arms (Малый государственный герб Российской Империи) of Imperial Russia.

The great imperial crown was placed above the Imperial Cypher (monogram) — but only after the coronation. Between ascending the throne and the coronation, the Imperial Cypher would bear the princely crown, but not the imperial crown.

The crown was also placed on the arms of Congress Poland, a semi-independent state in a personal union with the Russian Empire (1814–1915), and the Privislinsky Krai which was incorporated into the empire in 1831.

Since December 20, 2000, the imperial crown has appeared on the coat of arms of the Russian Federation.

Some cities and oblasts of Russia have their coat of arms depicting the imperial crown. The most notable example is the coat of arms of Saint Petersburg, which not only depicts the crown on top of it but two imperial sceptres in saltire behind it, and a third on it.

== See also ==
- Imperial crown
- Monomakh's Cap (the crown used before the Great Imperial Crown)
- Orlov diamond (set in the Russian Imperial sceptre)
- Coronation of the Russian monarch
