= Crown =

Form of headwear, symbolizing the power of a ruler

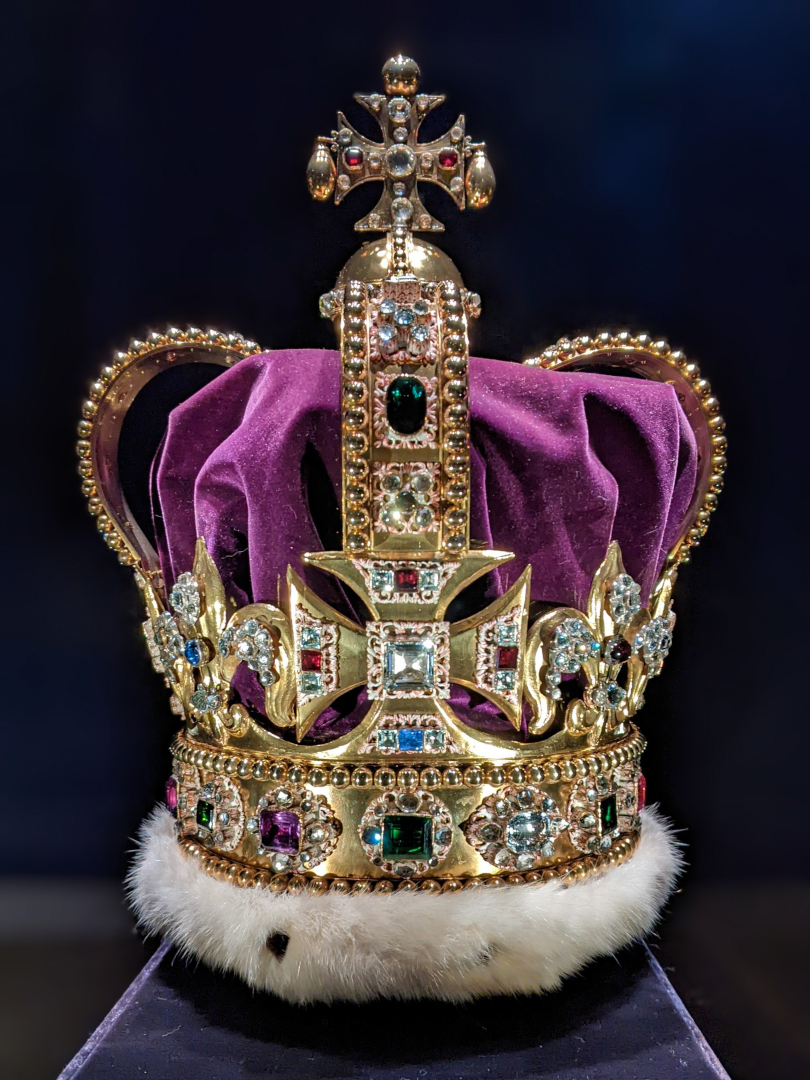
St Edward's Crown (1661), used for the coronation of English monarchs and, from 1707, British monarchs, to the present day.

A crown is a traditional form of head adornment, or hat, worn by monarchs as a symbol of their power and dignity. A crown is often, by extension, a symbol of the monarch's government or items endorsed by it. The word itself is used, particularly in Commonwealth countries, as an abstract name for the monarchy itself (and, by extension, the state of which said monarch is head) as distinct from the individual who inhabits it (that is, The Crown). A specific type of crown (or coronet for lower ranks of peerage) is employed in heraldry under strict rules. Indeed, some monarchies never had a physical crown, just a heraldic representation, to wit the constitutional kingdom of Belgium.

== Variations ==
- Costume headgear imitating a monarch's crown is also called a crown hat. Such costume crowns may be worn by actors portraying a monarch, people at costume parties, or ritual "monarchs" such as the king of a Carnival krewe, or the person who found the trinket in a king cake.
- The nuptial crown, sometimes called a coronal, worn by a bride, and sometimes the bridegroom, at their wedding is found in many European cultures since ancient times. In the present day, it is most common in Eastern Orthodox cultures. The Eastern Orthodox marriage service has a section called the crowning, wherein the bride and groom are crowned as "king" and "queen" of their future household. In Greek weddings, the crowns are diadems usually made of white flowers, synthetic or real, often adorned with silver or mother of pearl. They are placed on the heads of the newlyweds and are held together by a ribbon of white silk. They are then kept by the couple as a reminder of their special day. In Slavic weddings, the crowns are usually made of ornate metal, designed to resemble an imperial crown, and are held above the newlyweds' heads by their best men. A parish usually owns one set to use for all the couples that are married there since these are much more expensive than Greek-style crowns. This was common in Catholic countries in the past.
- Crowns are also often used as symbols of religious status or veneration, by divinities (or their representation such as a statue) or by their representatives (e.g., the Black Crown of the Karmapa Lama) sometimes used a model for wider use by devotees.
- According to the New Testament, a crown of thorns was placed on the head of Jesus before his crucifixion; it has become a common symbol of martyrdom.
- According to Roman Catholic tradition, the Blessed Virgin Mary was crowned as Queen of Heaven after her assumption into heaven. She is often depicted wearing a crown, and statues of her in churches and shrines are ceremonially crowned during May.
- The Crown of Immortality is also common in historical symbolism.
- The heraldic symbol of Three Crowns, referring to the three evangelical Magi (wise men), traditionally called kings, is believed thus to have become the symbol of the Swedish kingdom, but it also fits the historical (personal, dynastic) Kalmar Union (1397–1520) between the three kingdoms of Denmark, Sweden, and Norway.
- In India, crowns are known as makuta (Sanskrit for "crest"), and have been used in India since ancient times and are described adorning Hindu gods or kings. The makuta style was then copied by the Indianized kingdoms that was influenced by Hindu-Buddhist concept of kingship in Southeast Asia, such as in Java and Bali in Indonesia, Cambodia, Burma and Thailand.
- In East Asia, there were crowns such as the Chinese mianguan and Japanese benkan worn by emperors.
- Dancers of certain traditional Thai dances often wear crowns (mongkut) on their head. These are inspired in the crowns worn by deities and by kings.
- In pre-Colonial Philippines crown-like diadems, or putong, were worn by elite individuals and deities, among an array of golden ornaments.
- The shamsa was a massive, jewel-inlaid ceremonial crown hung by a chain that was part of the regalia of the Abbasid and Fatimid Caliphates.

== Terminology ==
Three distinct categories of crowns exist in those monarchies that use crowns or state regalia.

Coronation
Worn by monarchs when being crowned.
State
Worn by monarchs on other state occasions.
Consort crowns
Worn by a consort, signifying rank granted as a constitutional courtesy protocol.

Crowns or similar headgear, as worn by nobility and other high-ranking people below the ruler, are in English often called coronets; however, in many languages, this distinction is not made and the same word is used for both types of headgear (e.g., French couronne, German Krone, Dutch kroon). In some of these languages the term "rank crown" (rangkroon, etc.) refers to the way these crowns may be ranked according to hierarchical status. In classical antiquity, the crown (corona) that was sometimes awarded to people other than rulers, such as triumphal military generals or athletes, was actually a wreath or chaplet, or ribbon-like diadem.

== History ==
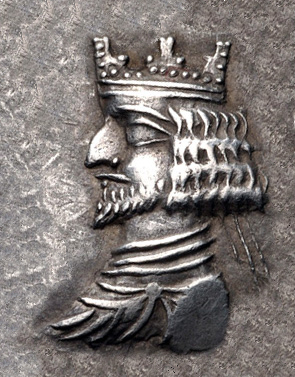
Crown of King of Persis Ardakhshir II, 1st century BC.

Crowns have been discovered in pre-historic times from Haryana, India. The precursor to the crown was the browband called the diadem, which had been worn by the Achaemenid Persian emperors. It was adopted by Constantine I and was worn by all subsequent rulers of the later Roman Empire. Almost all Sasanian kings wore crowns. One of the most famous kings who left numerous statues, reliefs, and coins of crowns is king Shapur I.

In Pharaonic Egypt, numerous crowns of various forms were used in antiquity, such as the Hedjet, Deshret, Pschent (double crown) and Khepresh. The Pharaohs of Egypt also wore the diadem, which was associated with solar cults, an association which was not completely lost, as it was later revived under the Roman Emperor Augustus. By the time of the Pharaoh Amenophis III (r.1390–1352c) wearing a diadem clearly became a symbol of royalty. The wreaths and crowns of classical antiquity were sometimes made from natural materials such as laurel, myrtle, olive, or wild celery.

The corona radiata, the "radiant crown" known best on the Statue of Liberty, and perhaps worn by the Helios that was the Colossus of Rhodes, was worn by Roman emperors as part of the cult of Sol Invictus prior to the Roman Empire's conversion to Christianity. It was referred to as "the chaplet studded with sunbeams" by Lucian, about 180 AD.

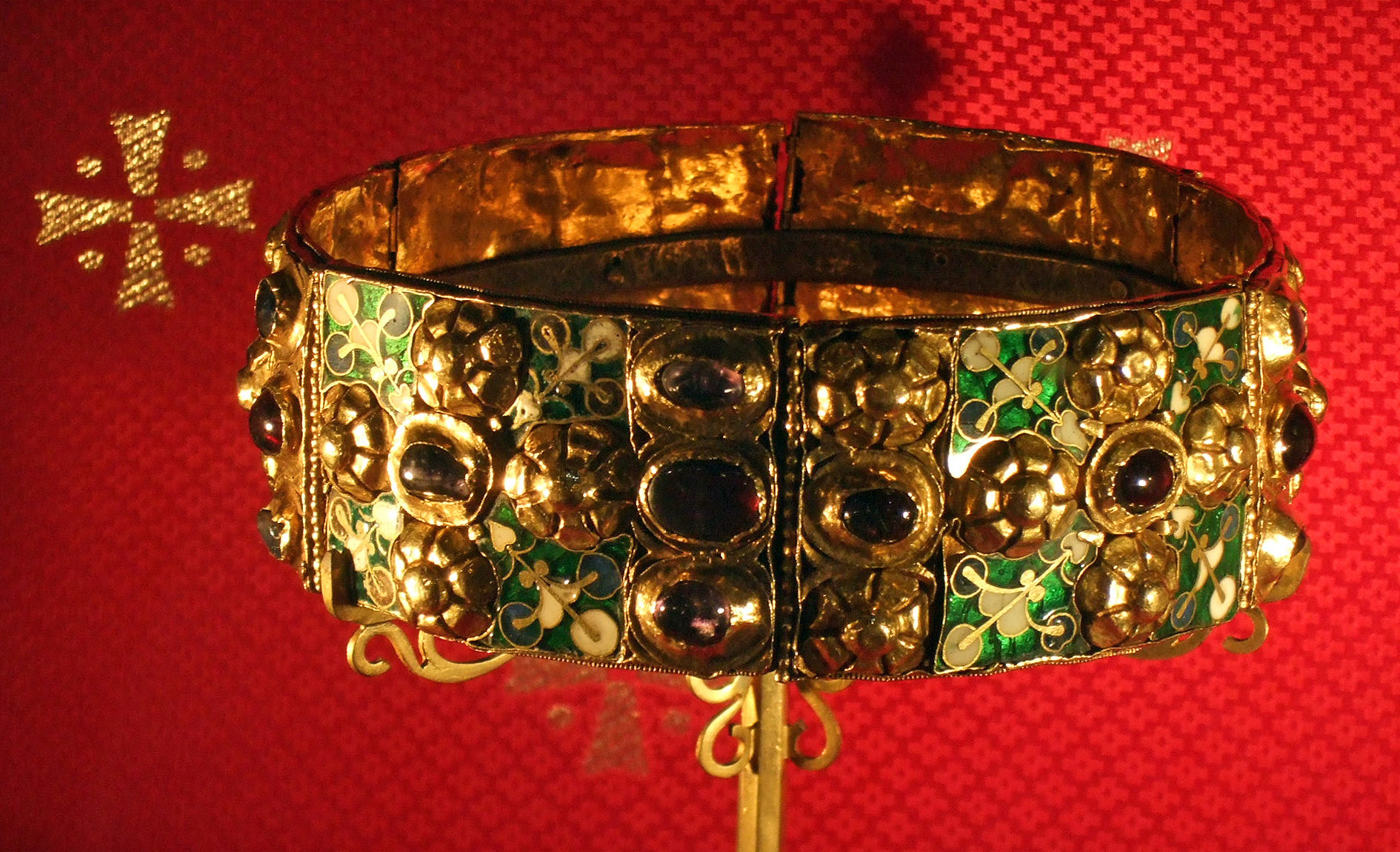
The Iron Crown of Lombardy.

In the Christian tradition of European cultures, where ecclesiastical sanction authenticates monarchic power when a new monarch ascends the throne, the crown is placed on the new monarch's head by a religious official in a coronation ceremony. Some, though not all, early Holy Roman Emperors travelled to Rome at some point in their careers to be crowned by the pope. Napoleon, according to legend, surprised Pius VII when he reached out and crowned himself, although in reality this order of ceremony had been pre-arranged.

Today, only the British Monarchy and Tongan Monarchy, with their anointed and crowned monarchs, continue this tradition, although many monarchies retain a crown as a national symbol. The French Crown Jewels were sold in 1885 on the orders of the Third French Republic, with only a token number, their precious stones replaced by glass, retained for historic reasons and displayed in the Louvre. The Spanish Crown Jewels were destroyed in a major fire in the 18th century while the so-called "Irish Crown Jewels" (actually merely the British Sovereign's insignia of the Most Illustrious Order of St Patrick) were stolen from Dublin Castle in 1907, just before the investiture of Bernard Edward Barnaby FitzPatrick, 2nd Baron Castletown.

The Crown of King George XII of Georgia made of gold and decorated with 145 diamonds, 58 rubies, 24 emeralds, and 16 amethysts. It took the form of a circlet surmounted by ornaments and eight arches. A globe surmounted by a cross rested on the top of the crown.

Special headgear to designate rulers dates back to pre-history, and is found in many separate civilizations around the globe. Commonly, rare and precious materials are incorporated into the crown, but that is only essential for the notion of crown jewels. Gold and precious jewels are common in western and oriental crowns. In the Native American civilizations of the Pre-Columbian New World, rare feathers, such as that of the quetzal, often decorated crowns; so too in Polynesia (e.g., Hawaii).

Coronation ceremonies are often combined with other rituals, such as enthronement (the throne is as much a symbol of monarchy as the crown) and anointing (again, a religious sanction, the only defining act in the Biblical tradition of Israel).

In other cultures, no crown is used in the equivalent of coronation, but the head may still be otherwise symbolically adorned; for example, with a royal tikka in the Hindu tradition of India.

== Gallery ==
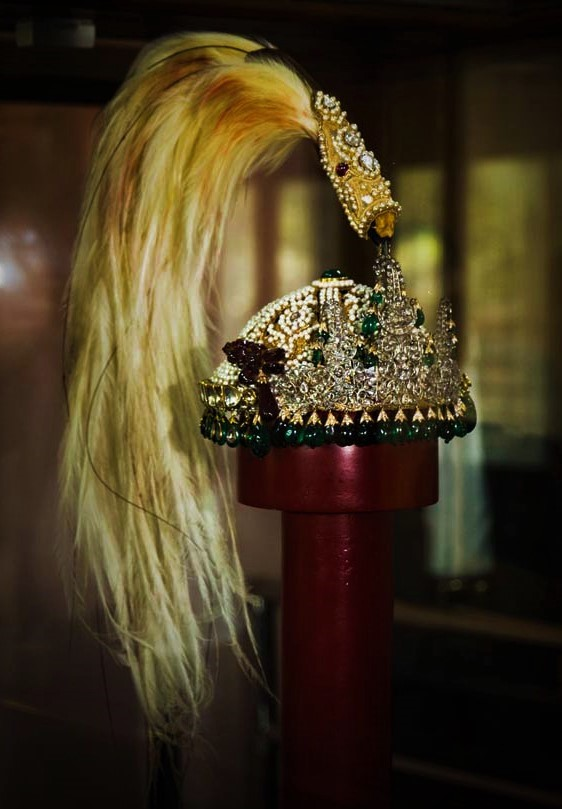
Shripech, the royal crown of the Kingdom of Nepal.

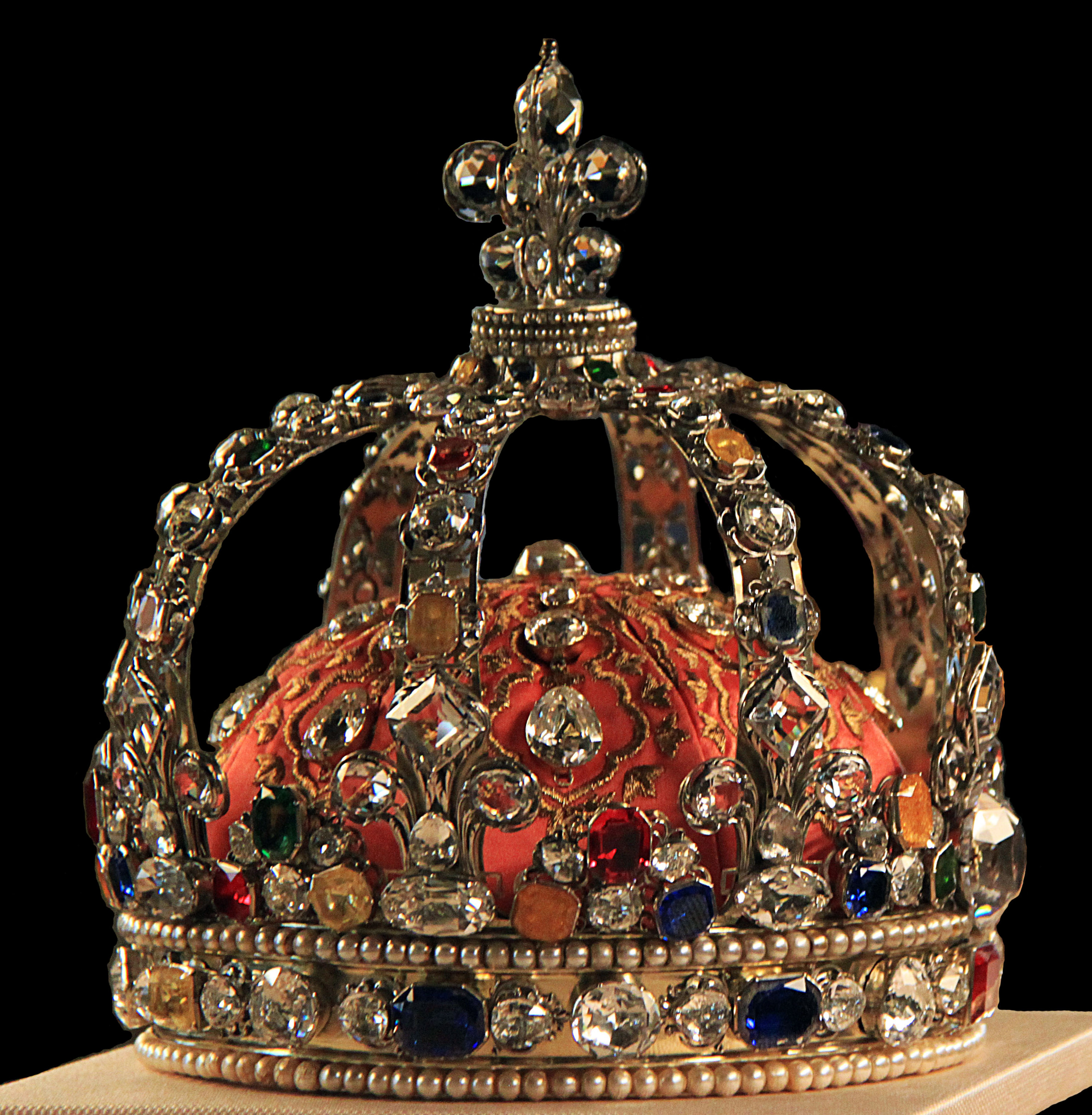
Crown of Louis XV

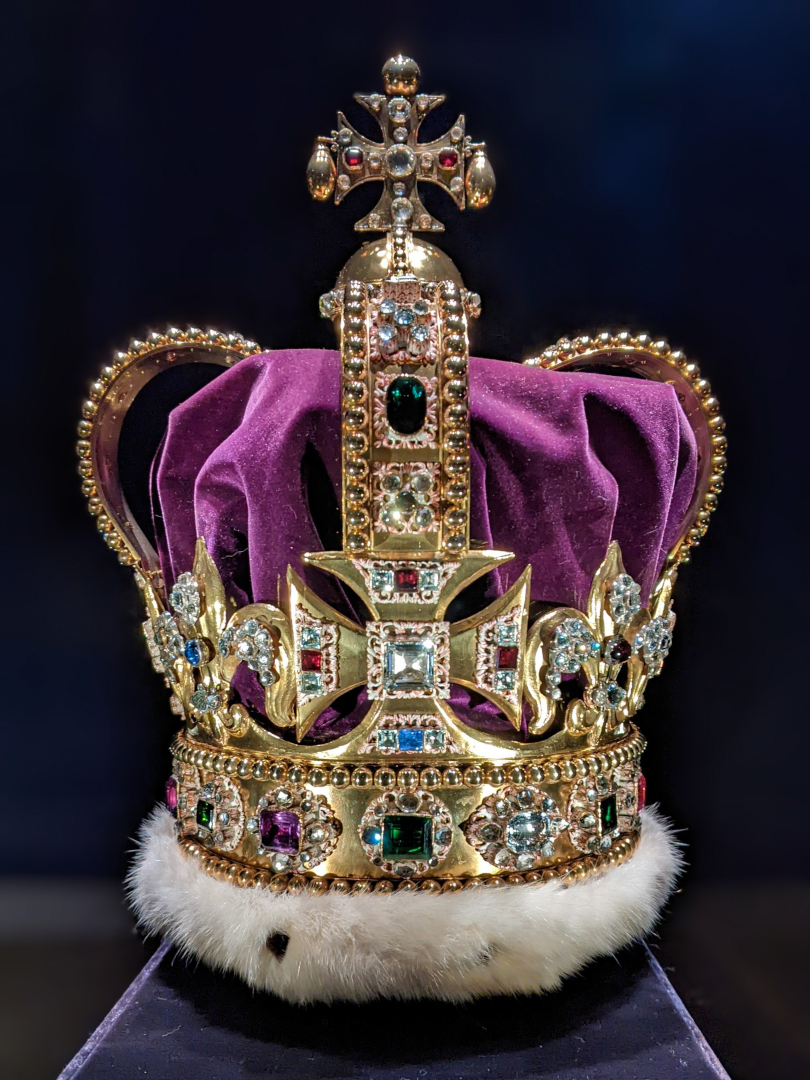
St Edward's Crown (1661)

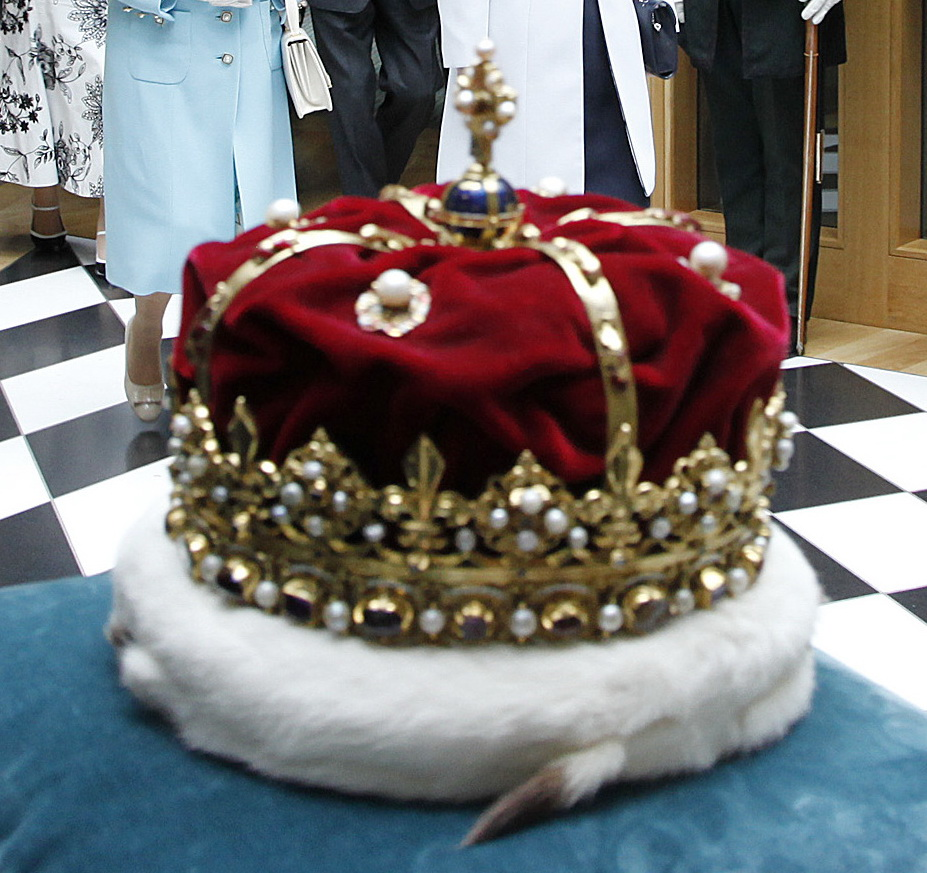
Crown of Scotland (1540) at the Scottish Parliament, (Kept at Edinburgh Castle)

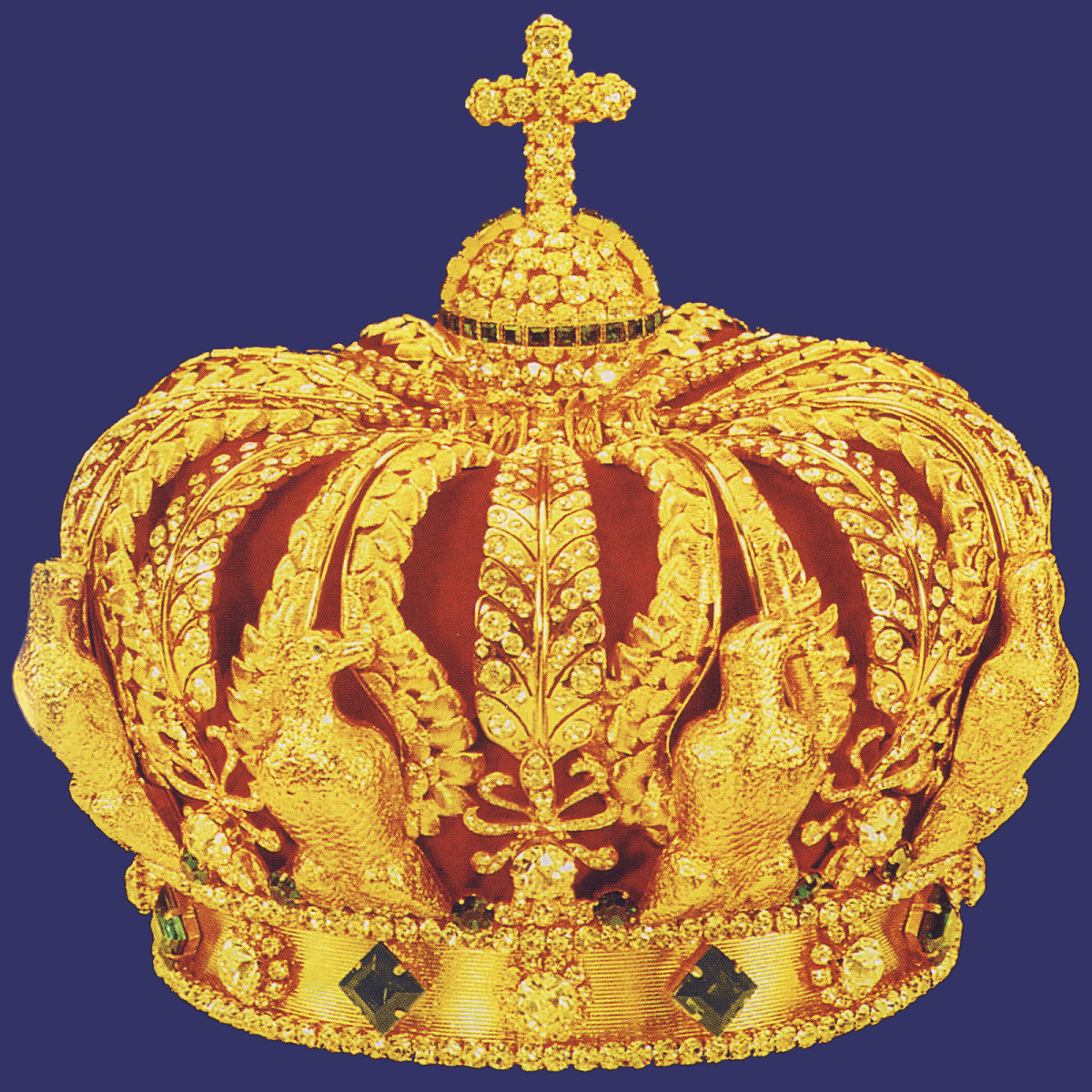
Reproduction of Imperial Crown of Napoleon III of France.

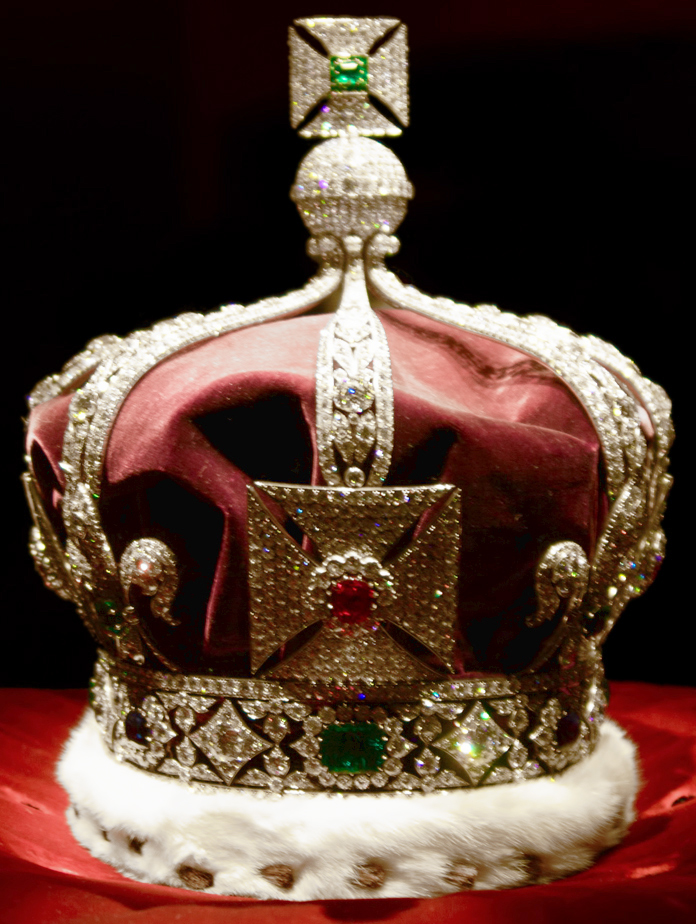
The Imperial Crown of India, worn by Emperor George V at his Delhi Durbar (1911).

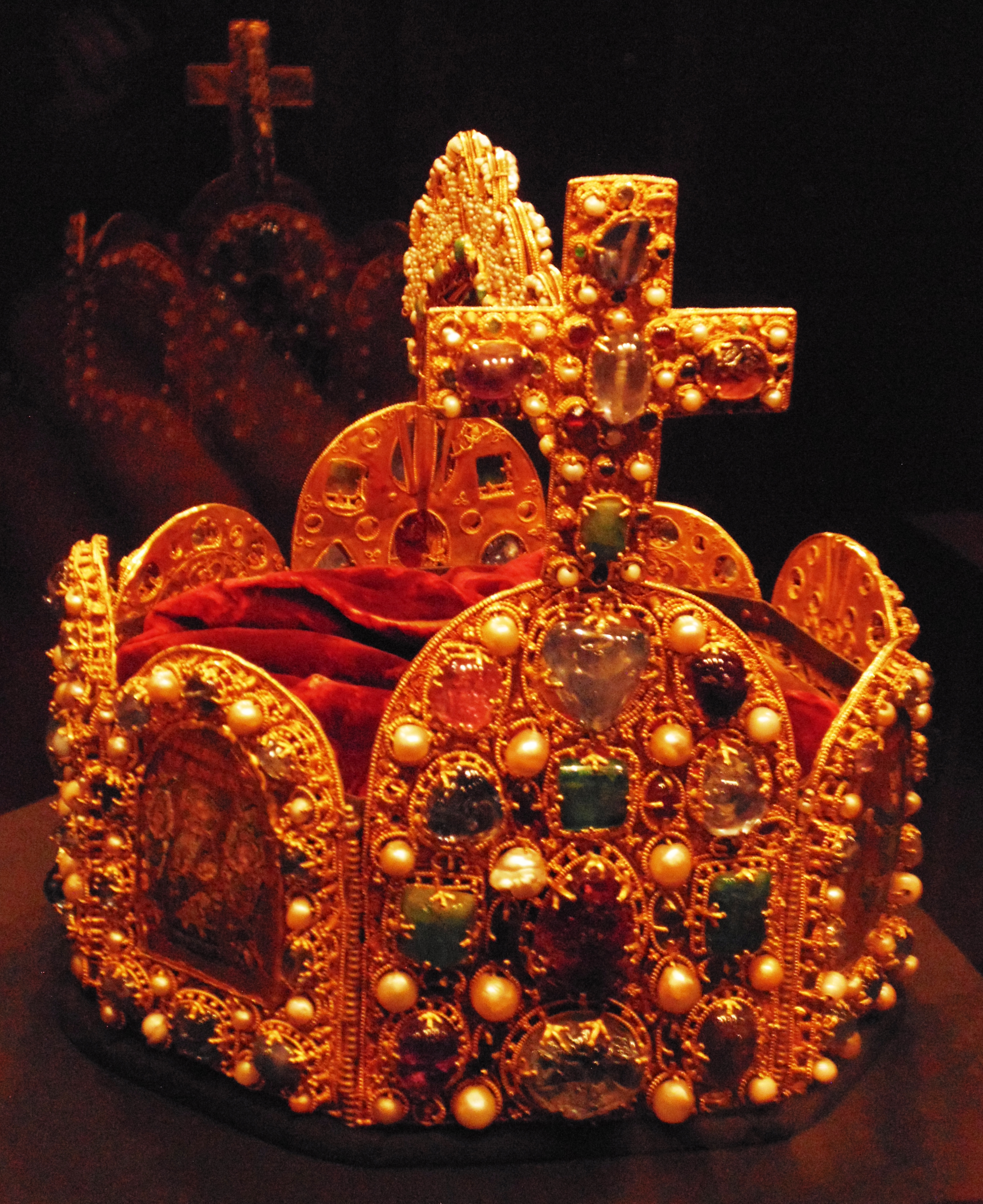
Imperial Crown of the Holy Roman Empire, c. 962, Imperial Treasury, Vienna

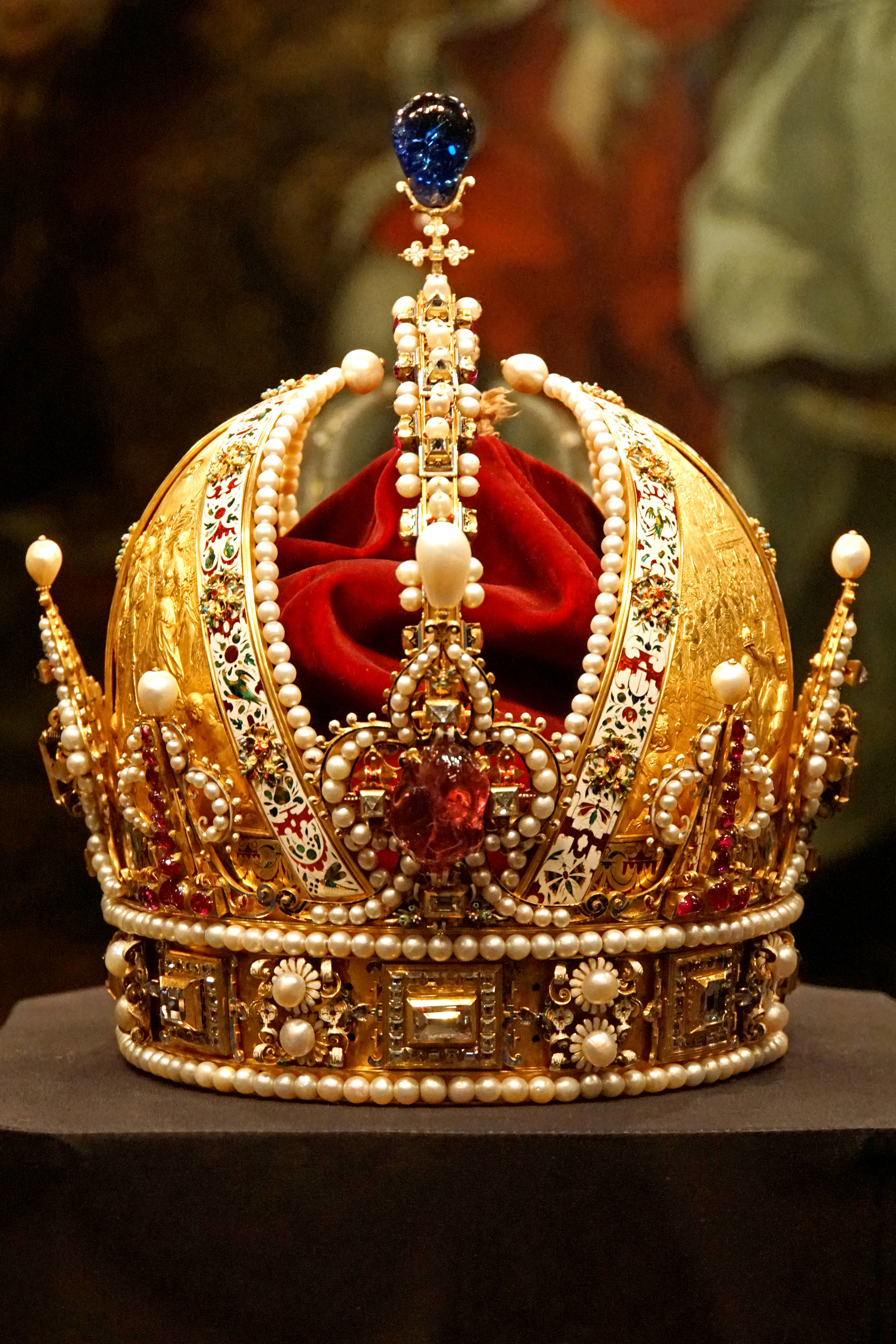
Imperial Crown of Austria, c. 1602, Imperial Treasury, Vienna

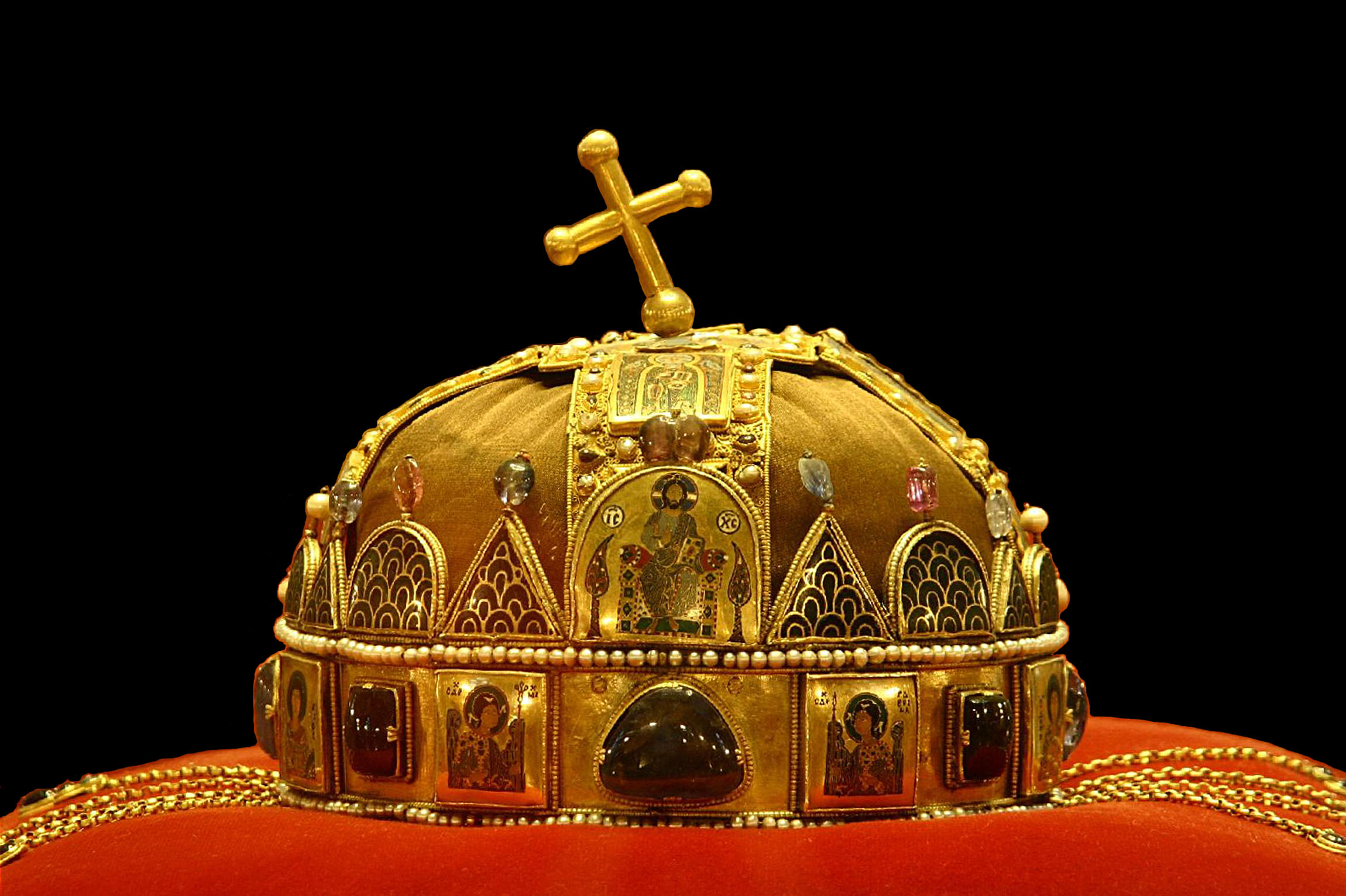
The Holy Crown of Hungary, also called the Crown of Saint Stephen, of the Kingdom of Hungary (Byzantine work, Constantinople (Istanbul), 11th century), Hungarian Parliament Building, Budapest

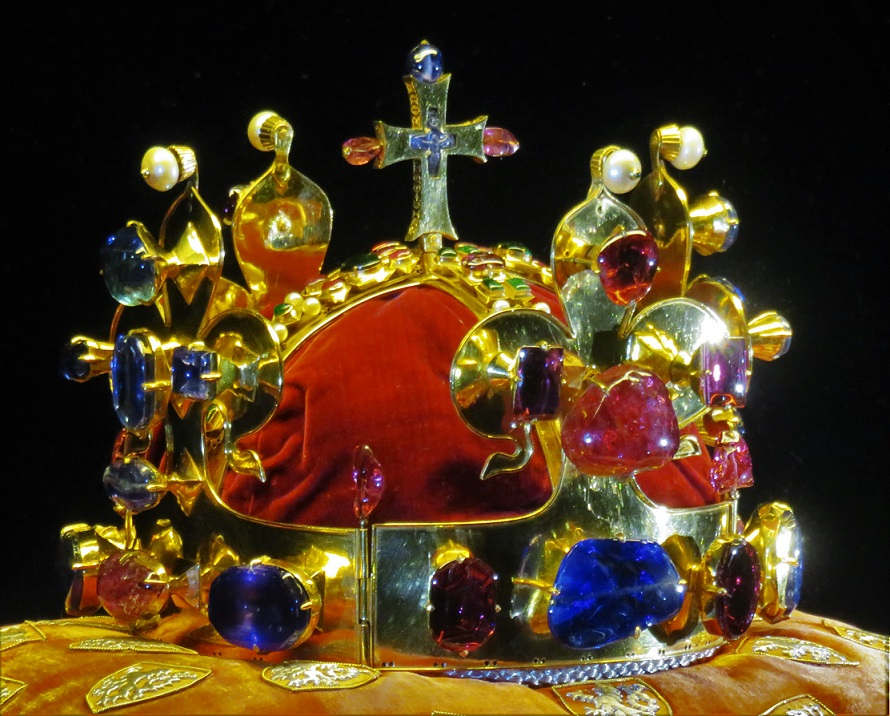
Crown of Saint Wenceslas, 1346 (Lands of the Bohemian Crown), St. Vitus Cathedral, Prague

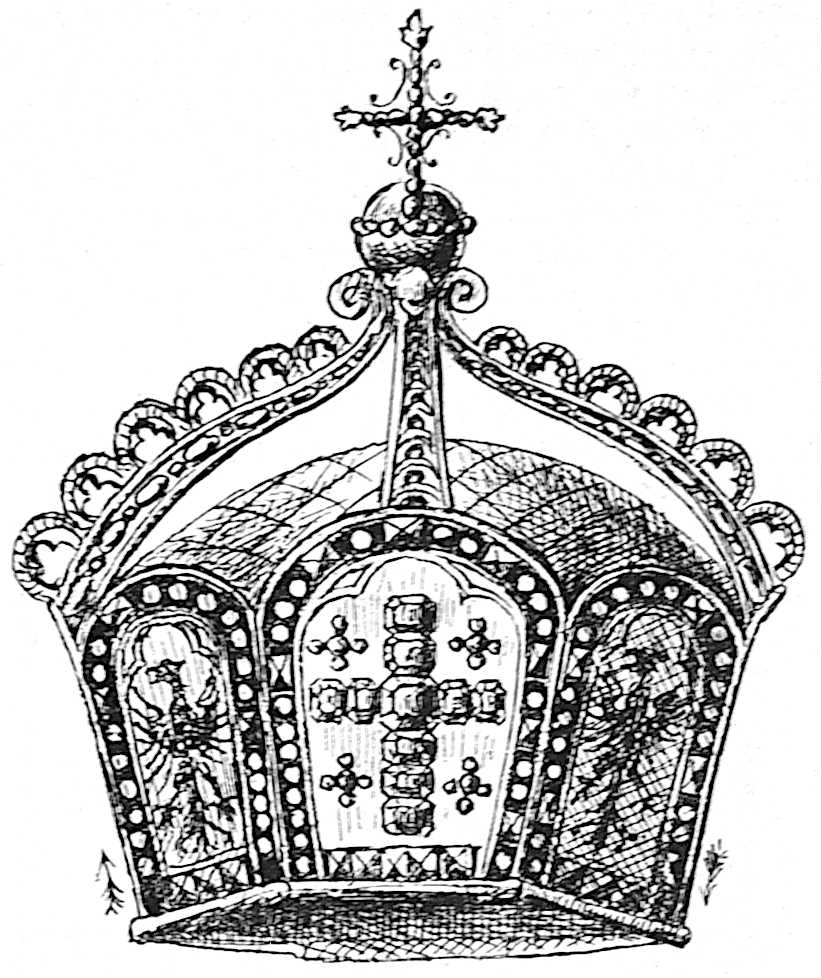
German State Crown

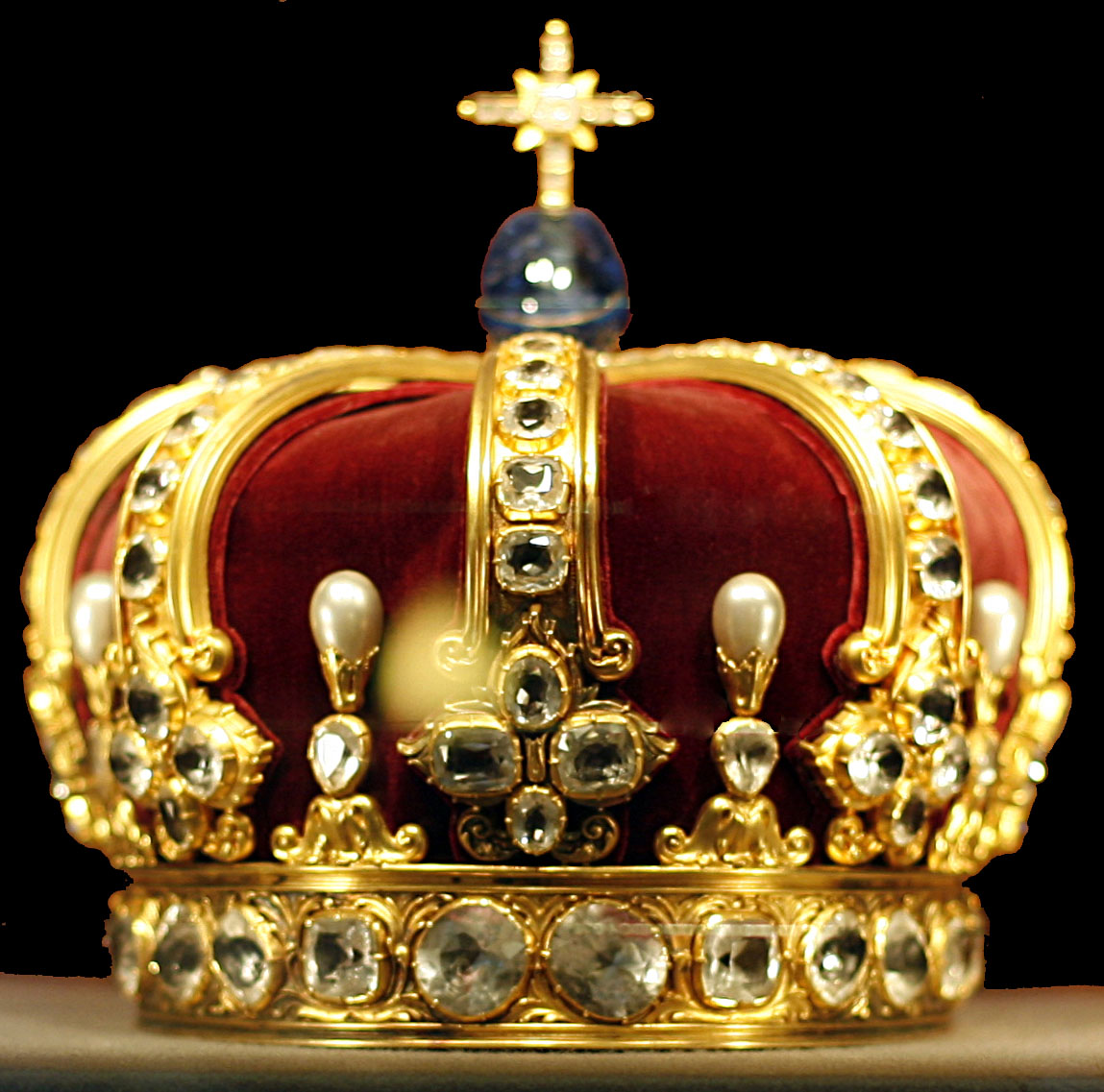
Crown of Wilhelm II of the Kingdom of Prussia, Hohenzollern Castle

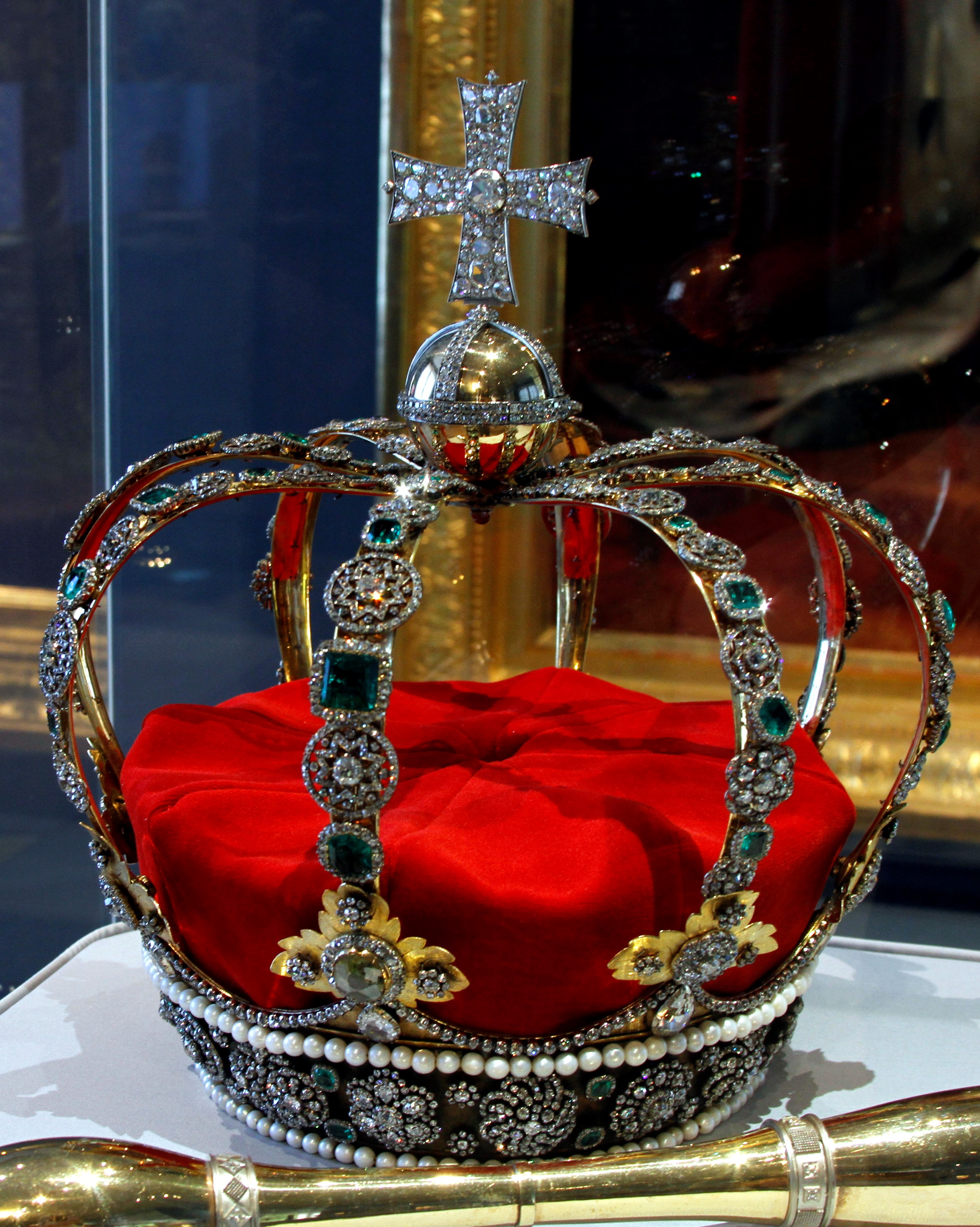
Crown of Württemberg, Württemberg State Museum, Stuttgart (1806)

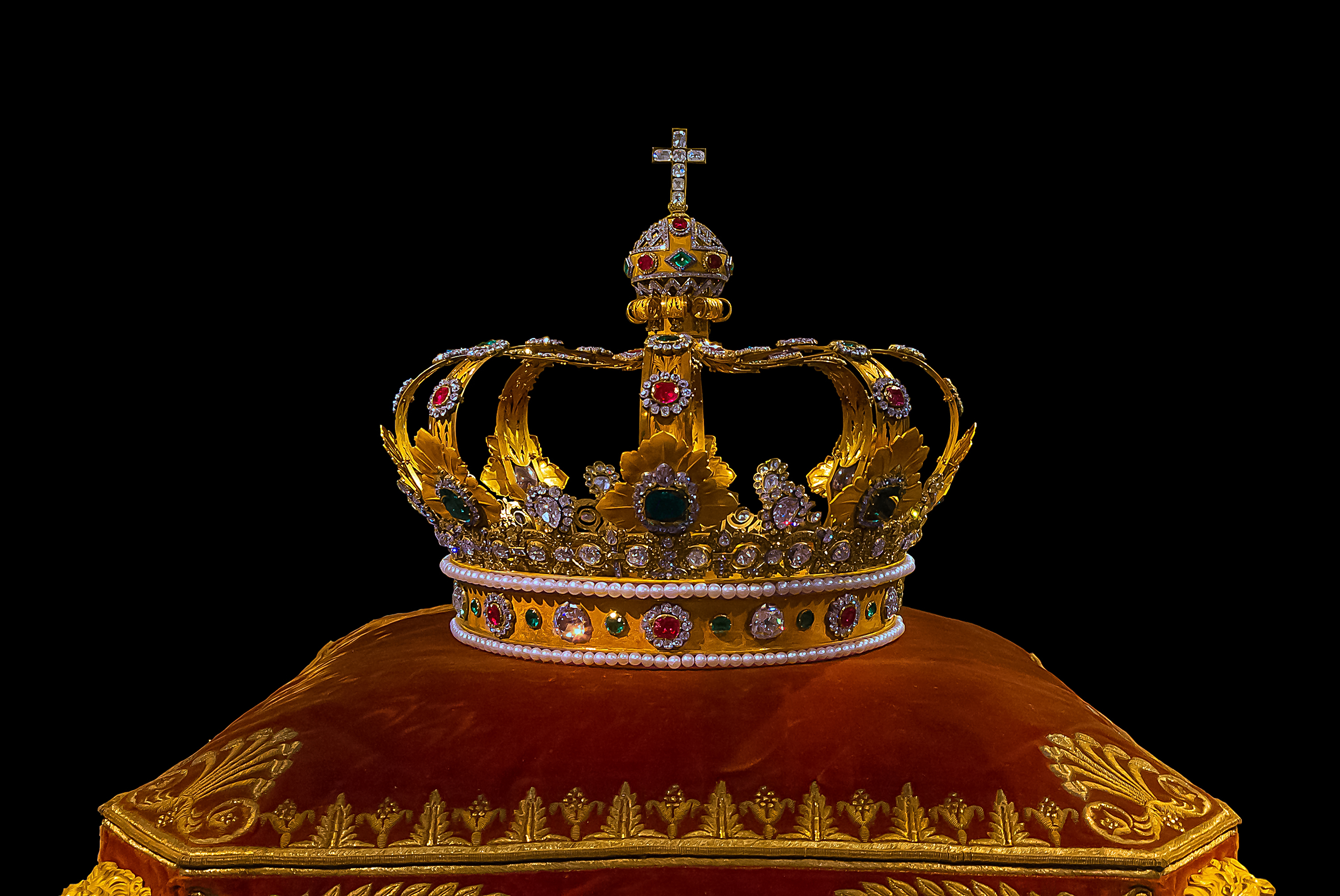
Crown of the Kingdom of Bavaria (Paris 1806), Munich Residenz

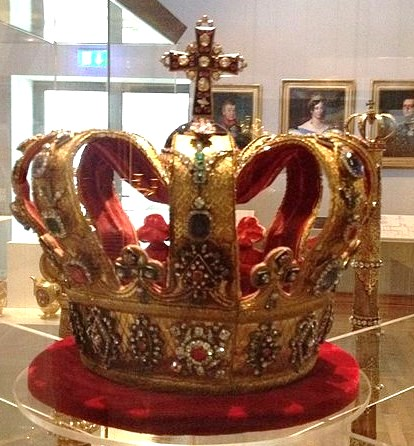
Grand Ducal Crown of Baden, 1811 (Karlsruhe Palace), made of a wire frame reinforced with paperboard, crimson coloured velvet, gold-plated sheet silver, yellow silk

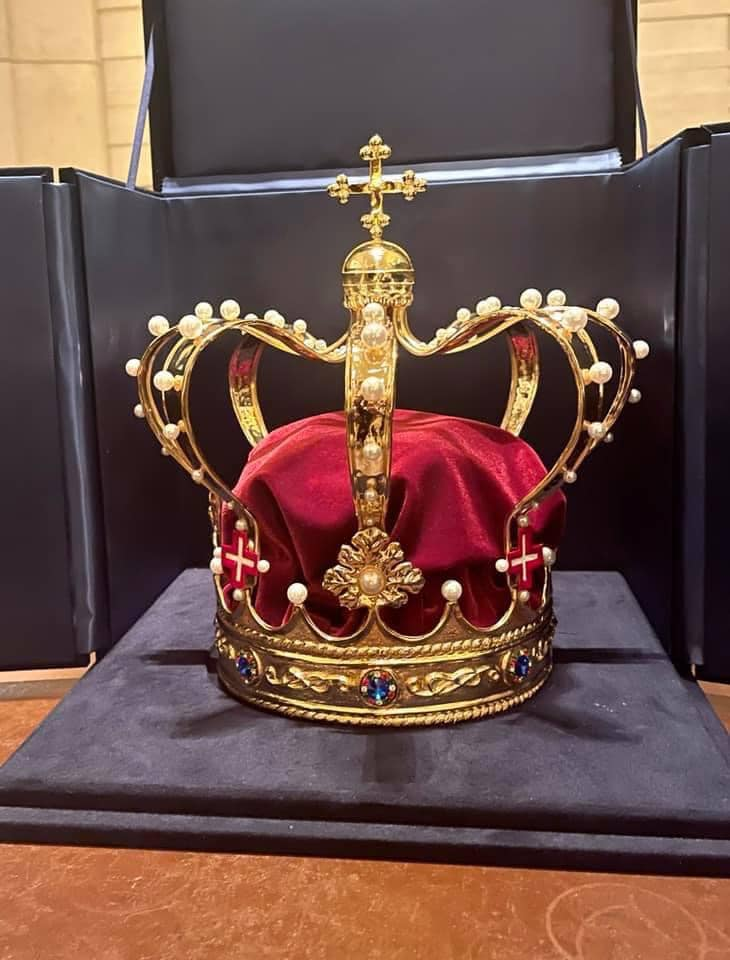
Crown of the Kingdom of Italy, 1861, Royal Palace of Monza

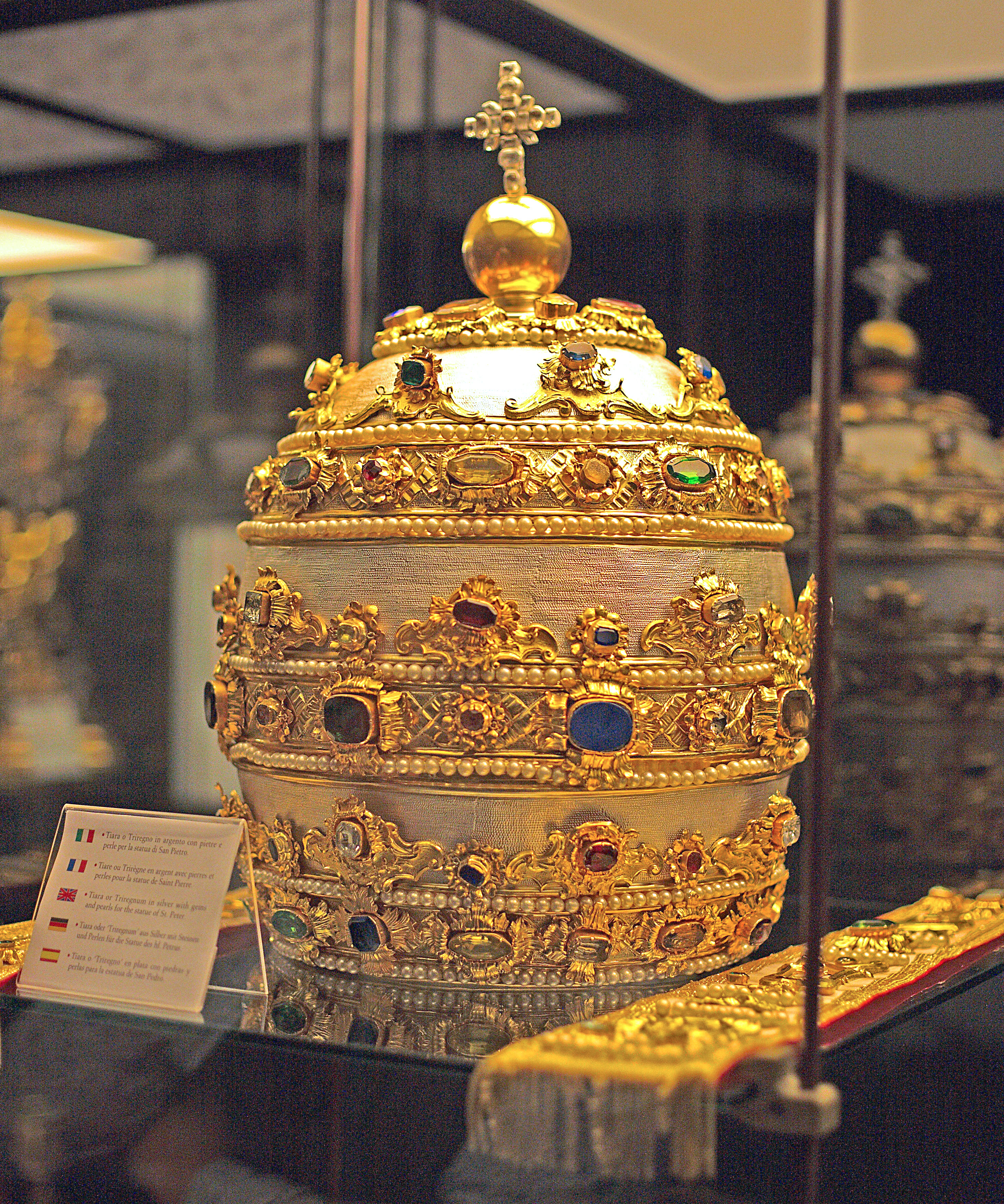
The Papal tiara, worn by the popes to symbolize their authority within the Catholic Church, was last used in 1963 (St. Peter's Basilica, Vatican City).

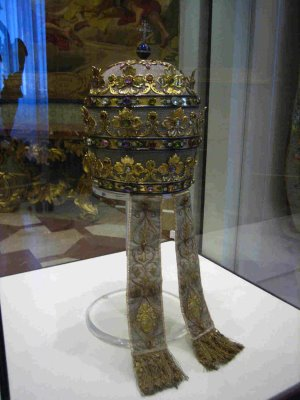
The Palatine tiara of Pope Pius IX (19th Century)

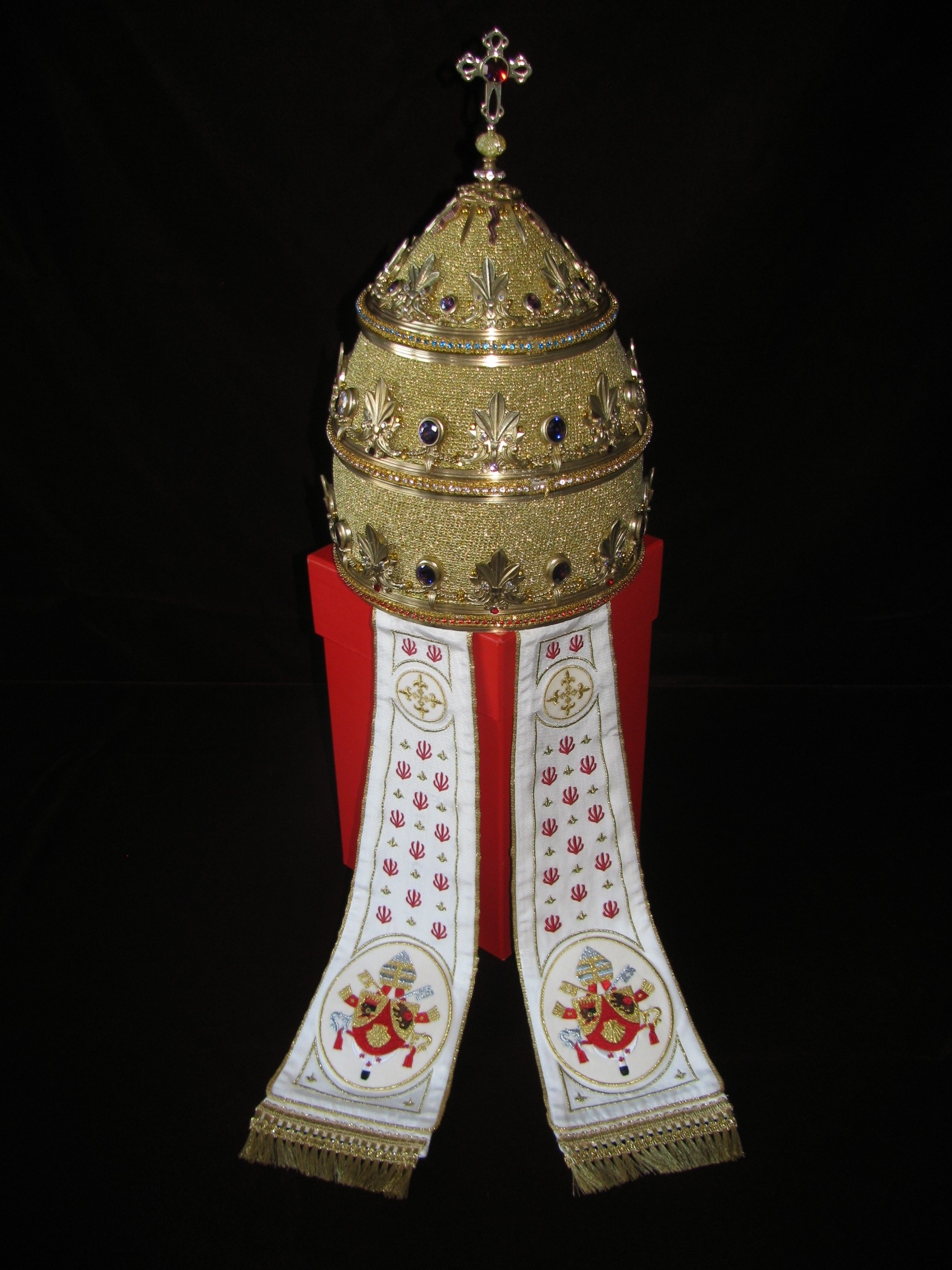
Tiara of Pope Benedict XVI (21st Century)

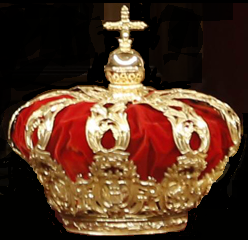
Spanish Royal Crown

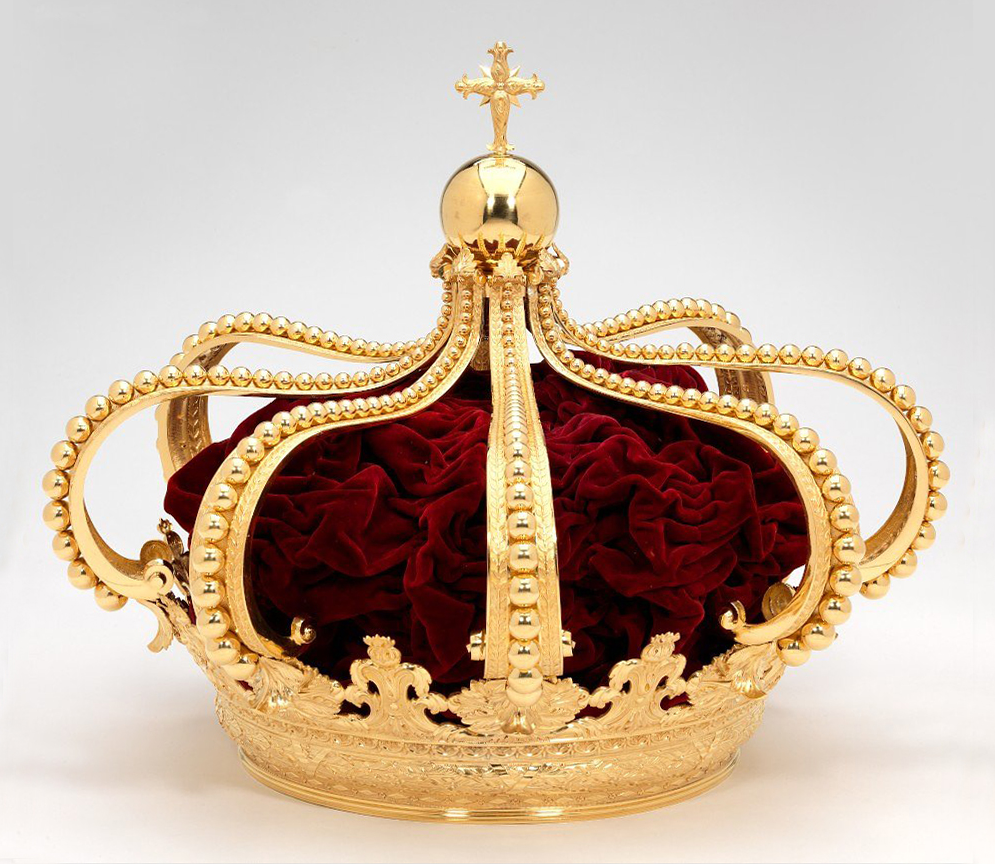
Crown of João VI

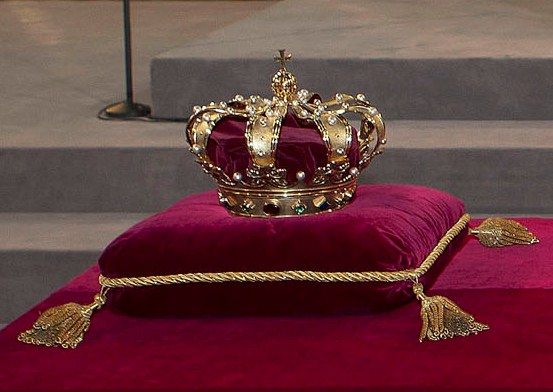
Crown of the Netherlands

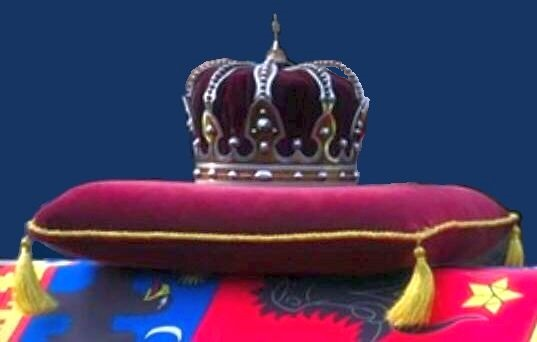
Crown of Carol I forged from an Ottoman cannon captured by the Romanian Army during the 1877-1878 War.

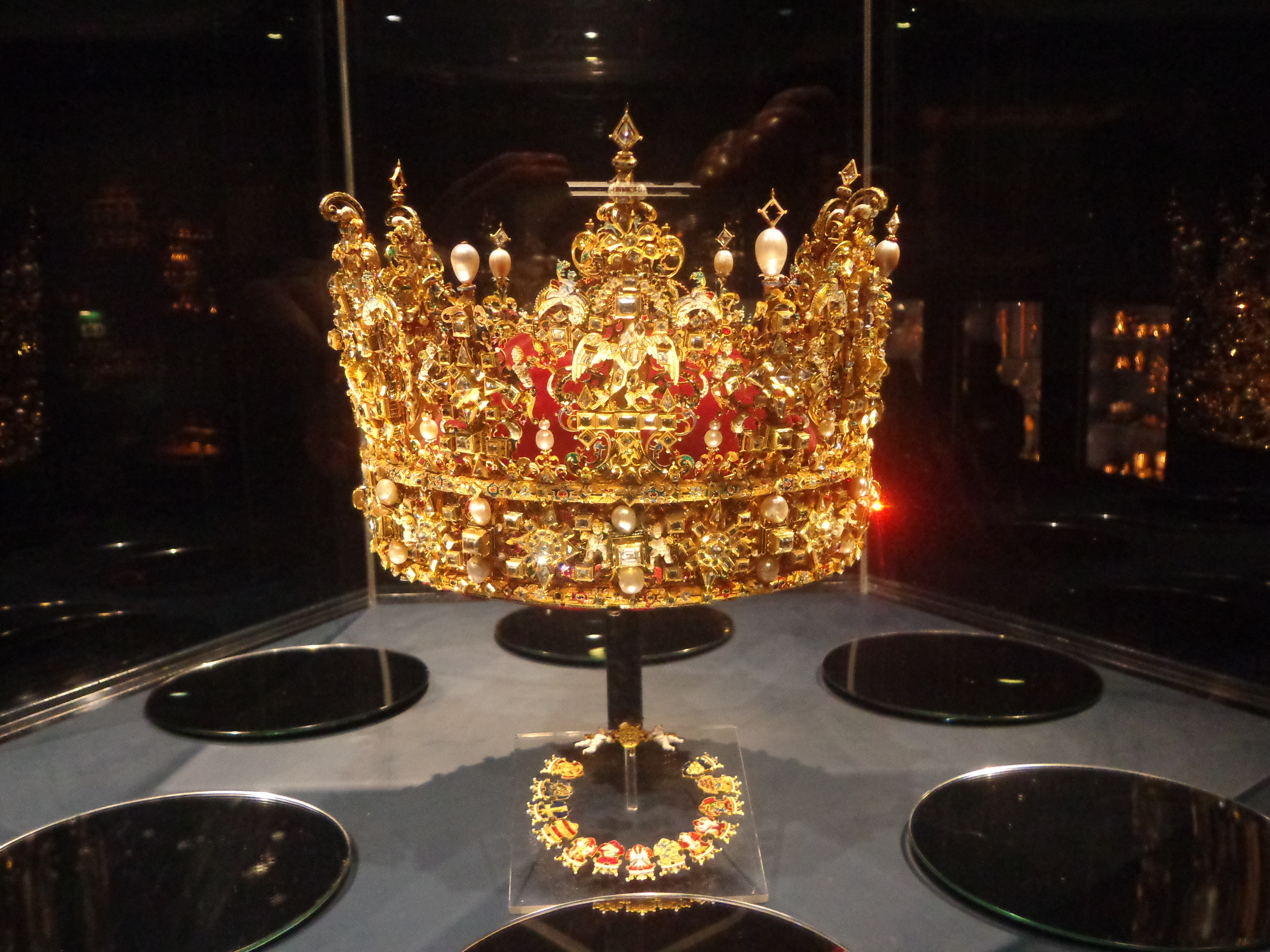
The Crown of Christian IV (16th century), currently located in Rosenborg Castle, Copenhagen.

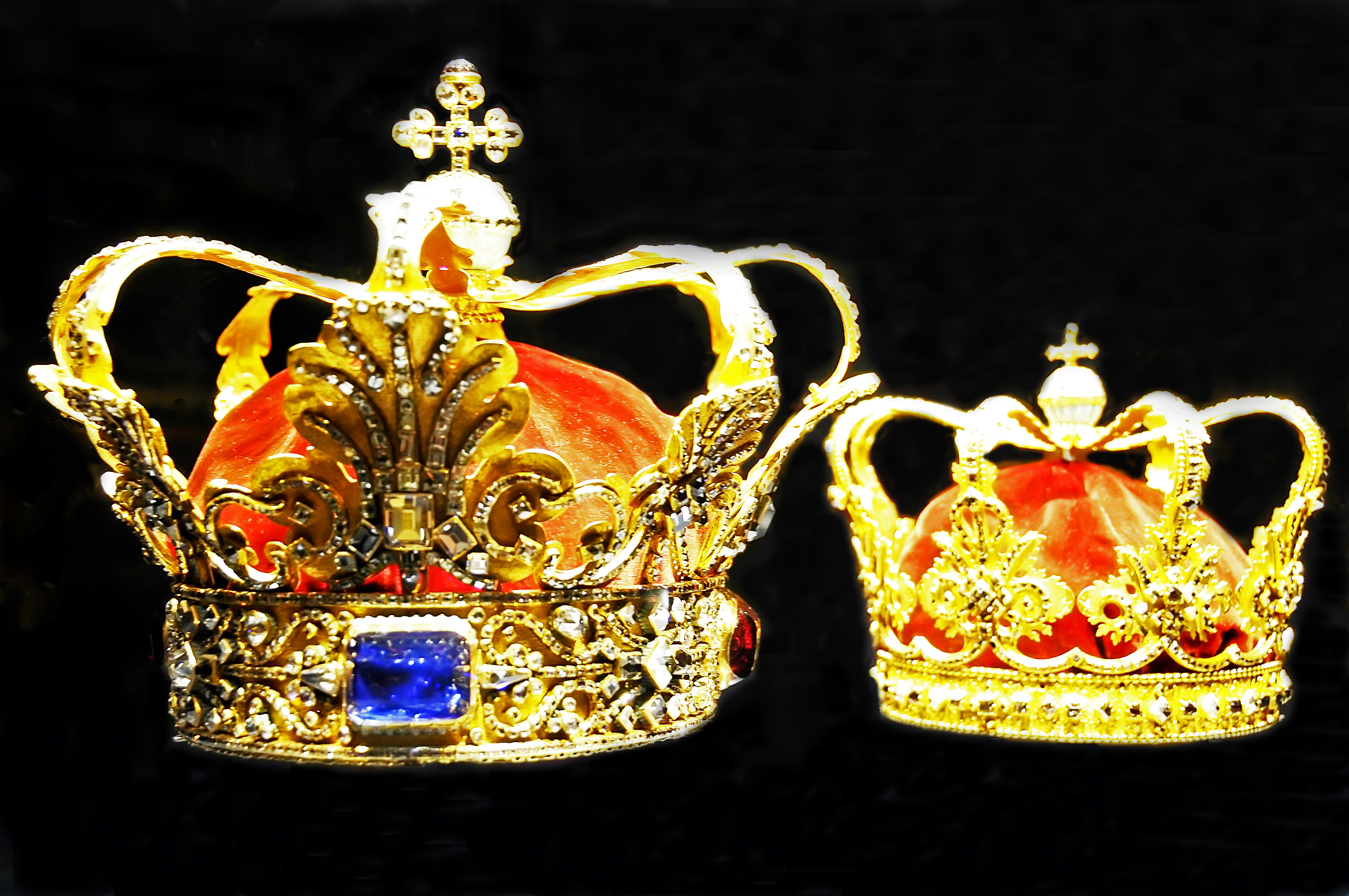
The Crown of Christian V (1671), currently located in Rosenborg Castle, Copenhagen.

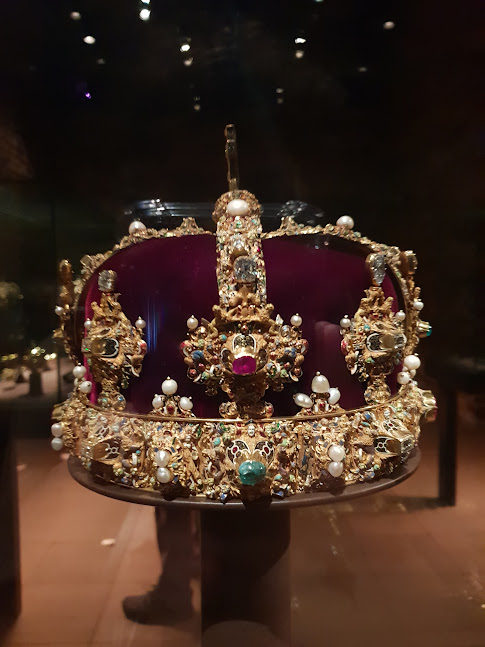
Royal Crown of Sweden (1561)

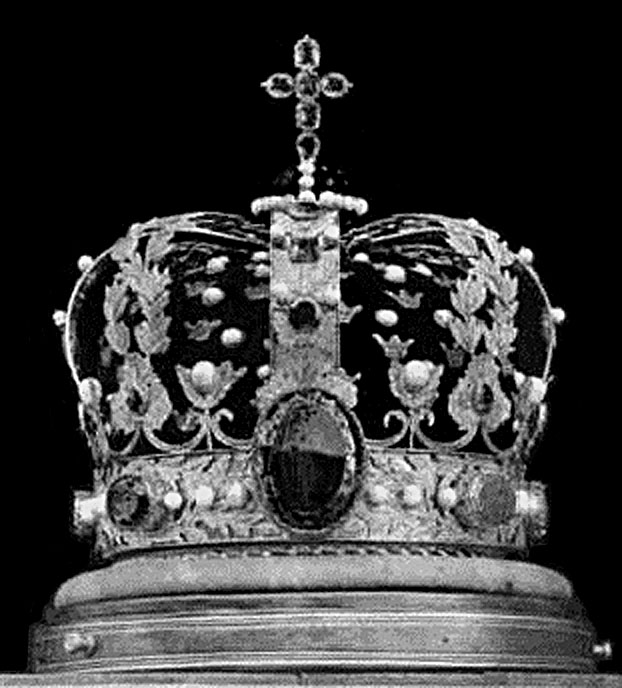
Crown of Norway

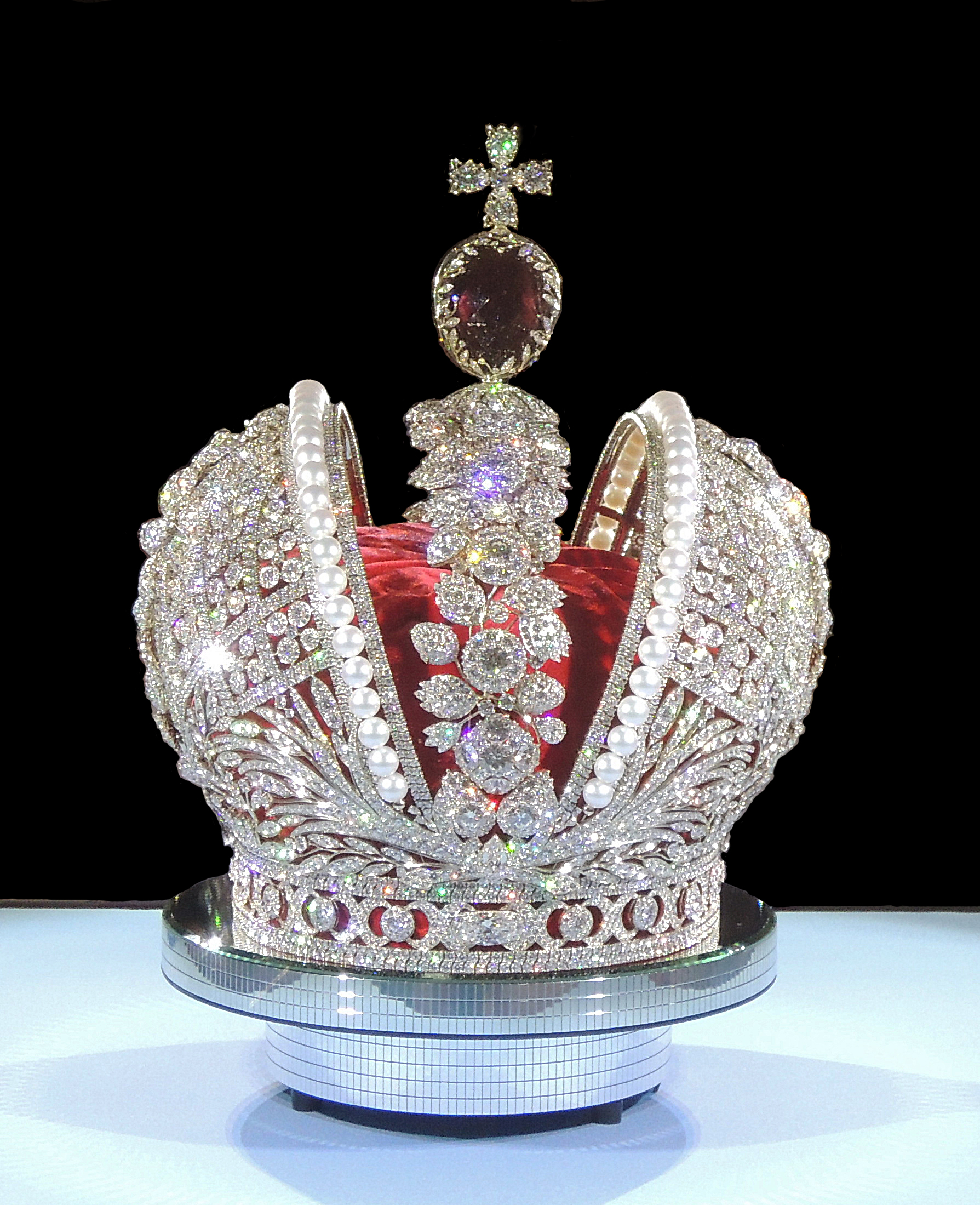
Great Imperial Crown of the Russian Empire.

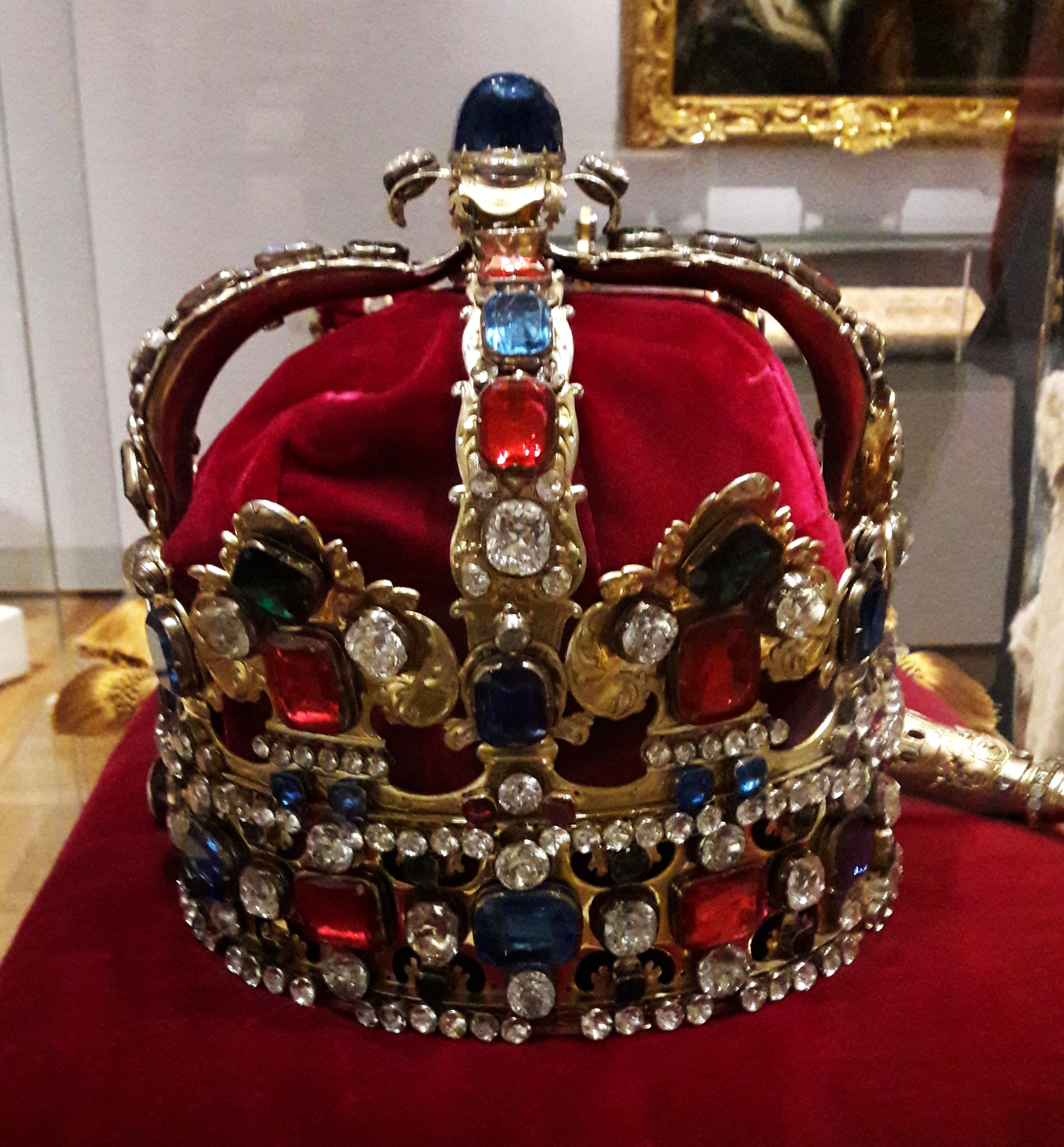
Crown of Augustus III of Poland c. 1733

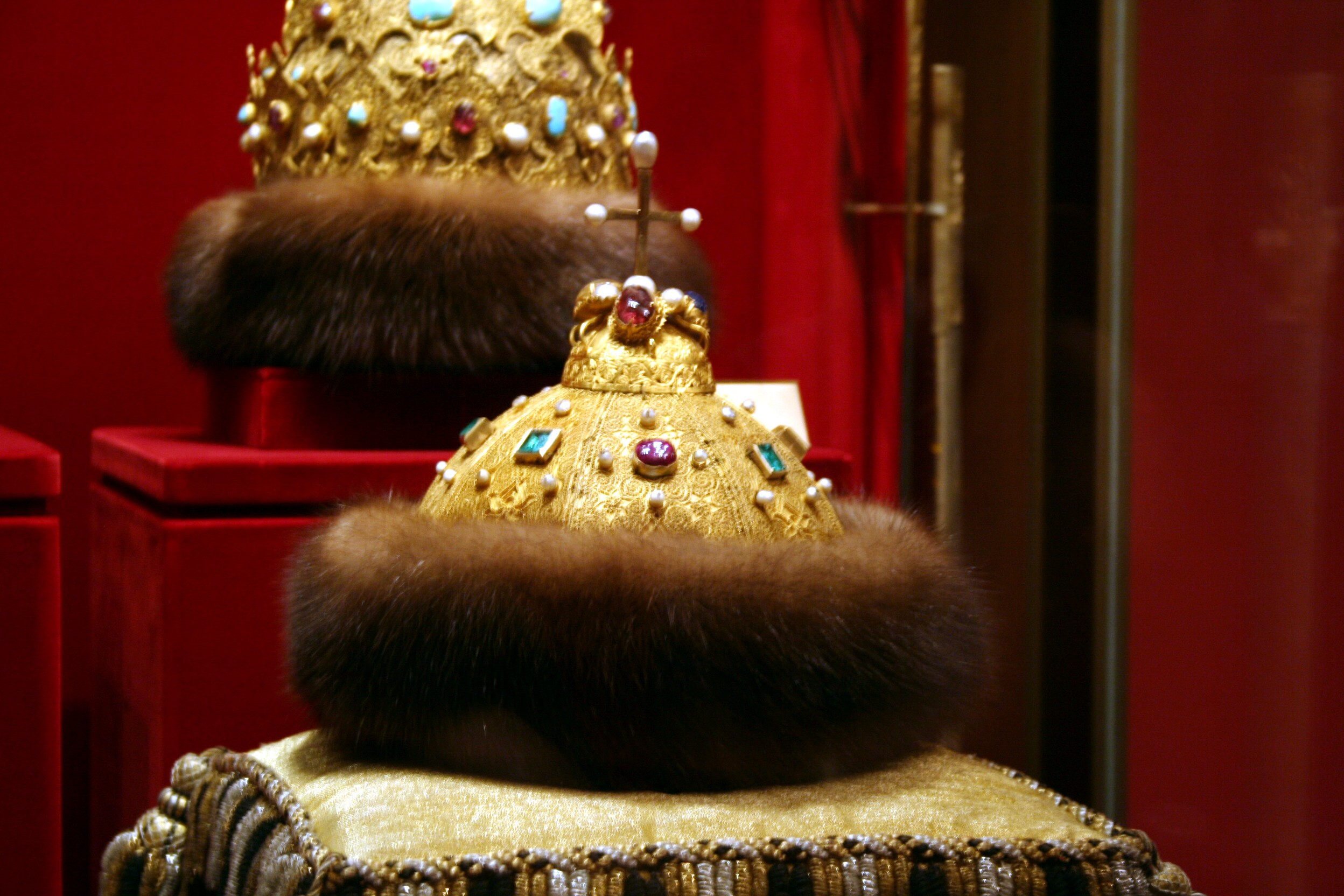
Russian tsar's crown (14th century)

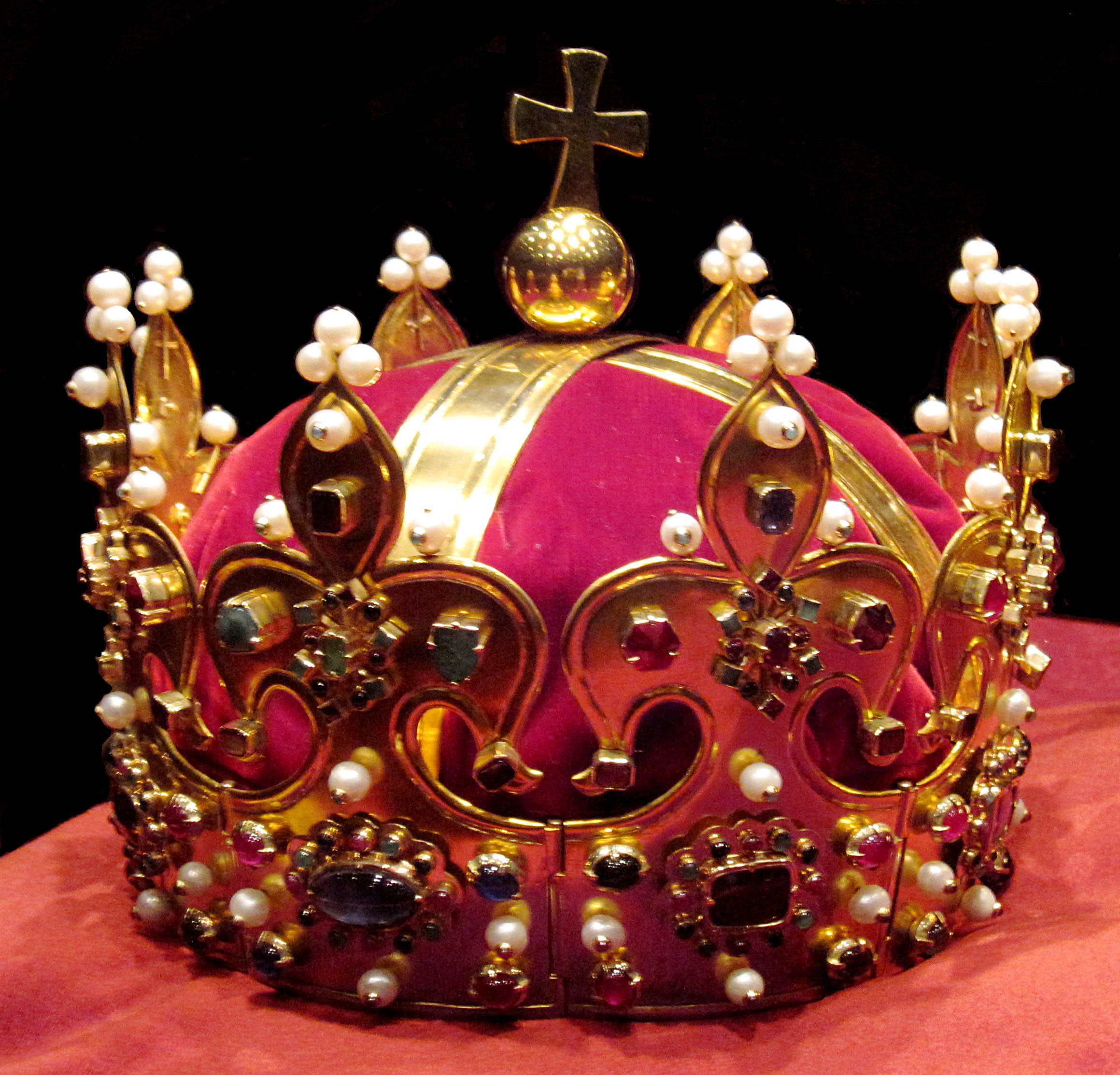
Replica of the destroyed Crown of Bolesław I the Brave of Poland.

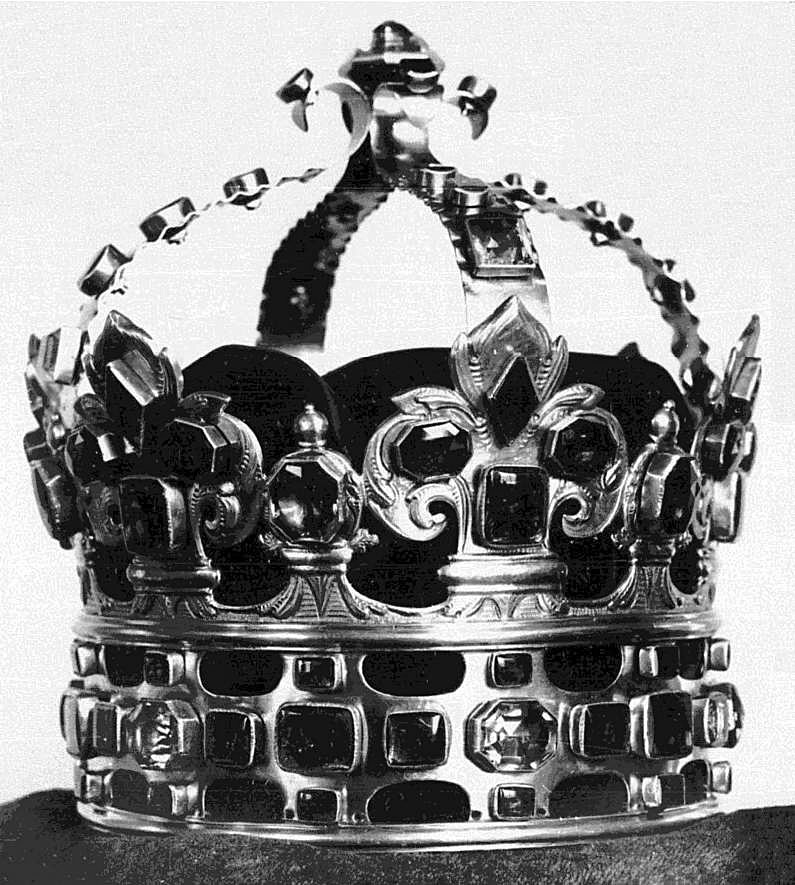
Crown of Augustus II the Strong

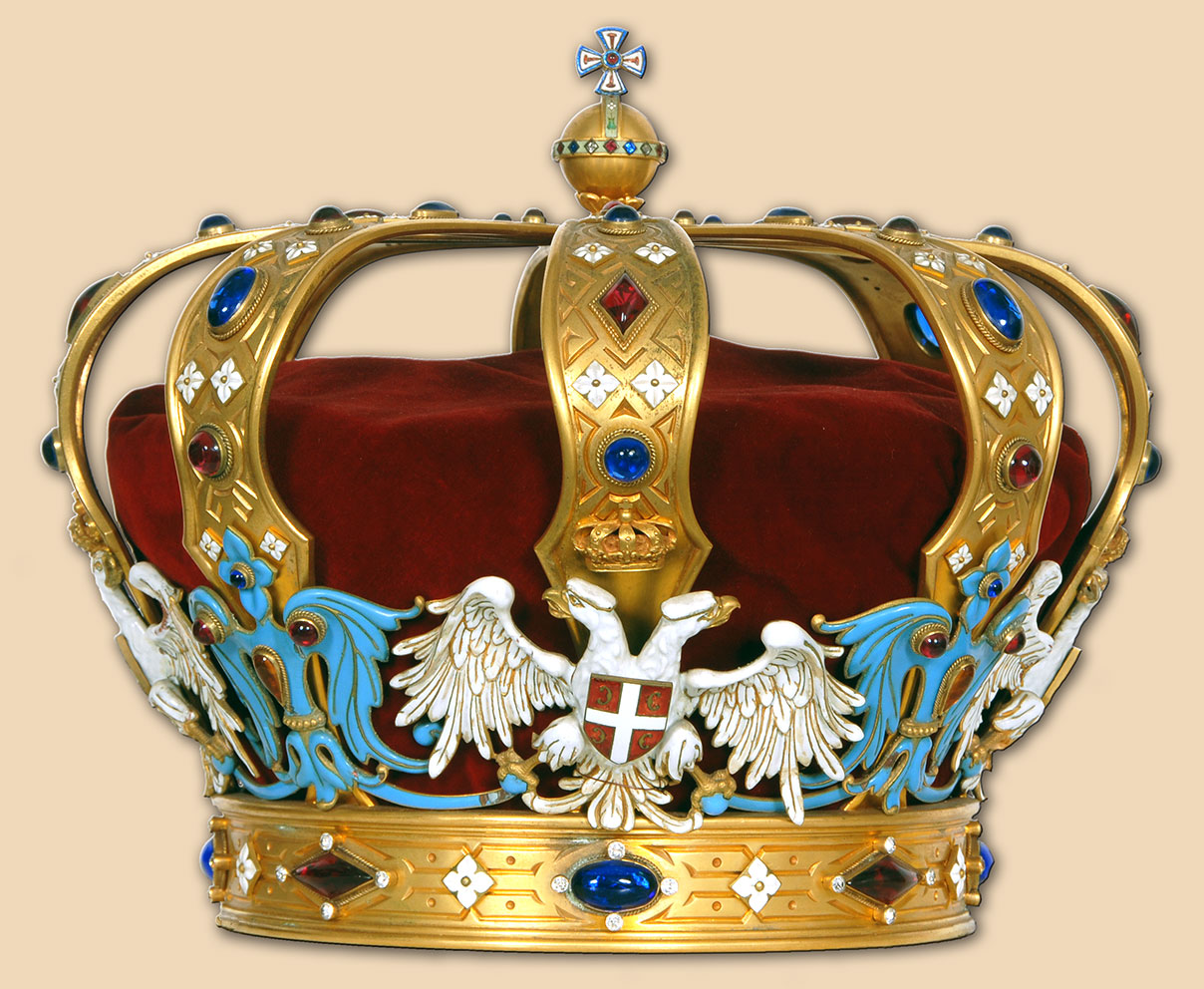
Karađorđević Crown (Serbia)

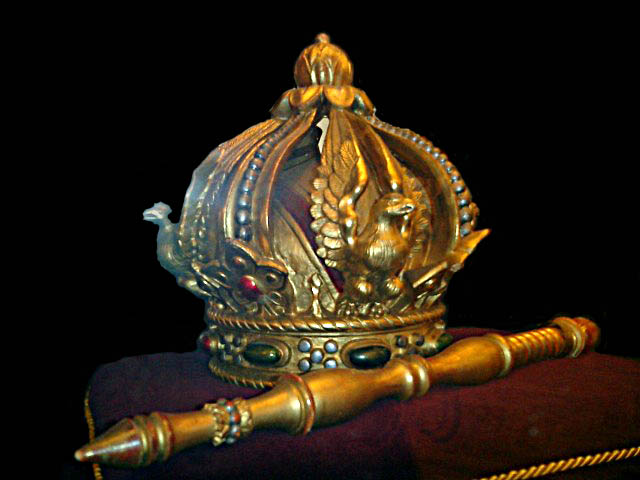
Imperial crown of Maximilian I of Mexico (1864-1867) as funerary insignia, located in the Imperial Furniture Collection in Vienna.

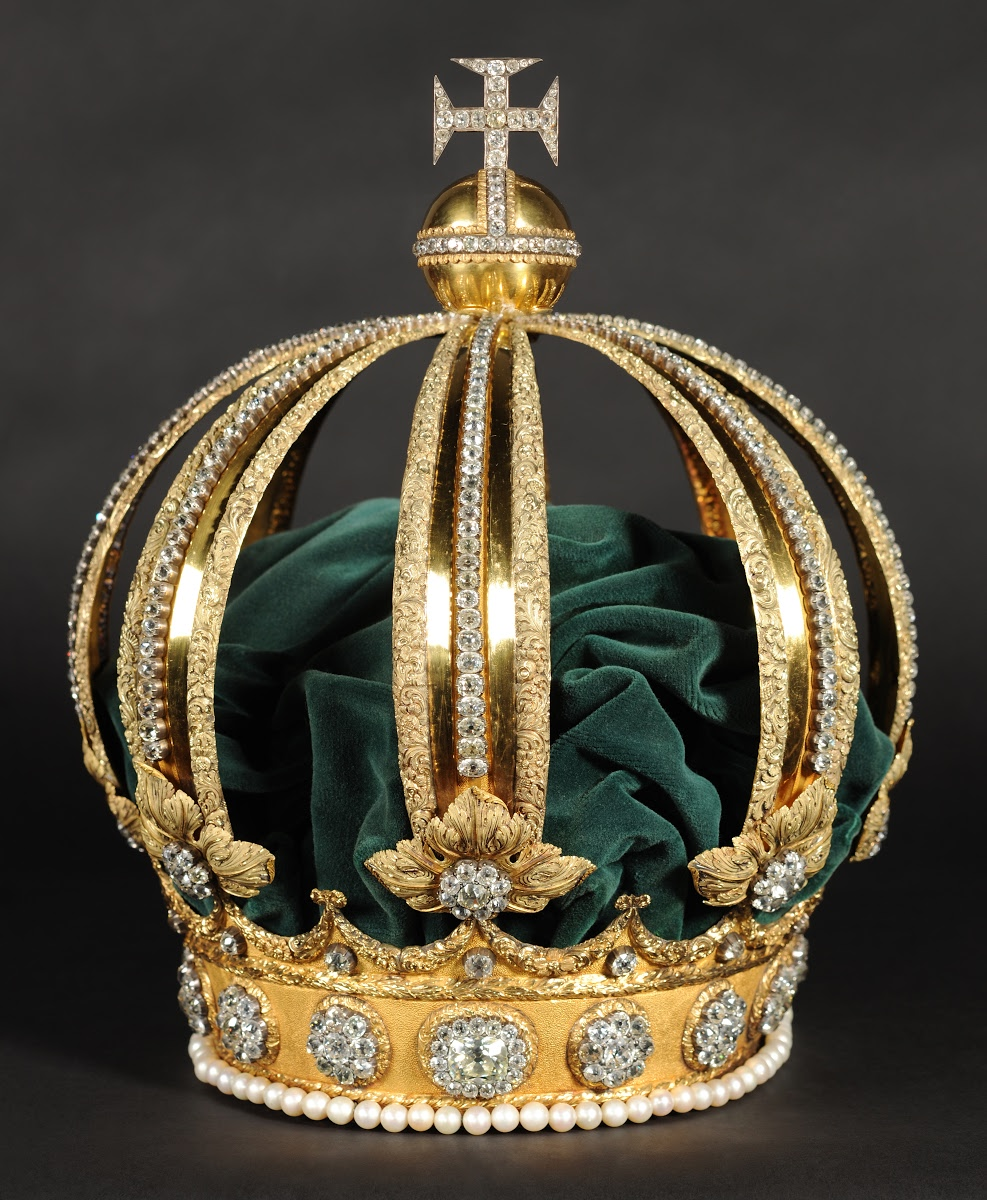
Imperial Crown of Pedro II of Brazil (1841)

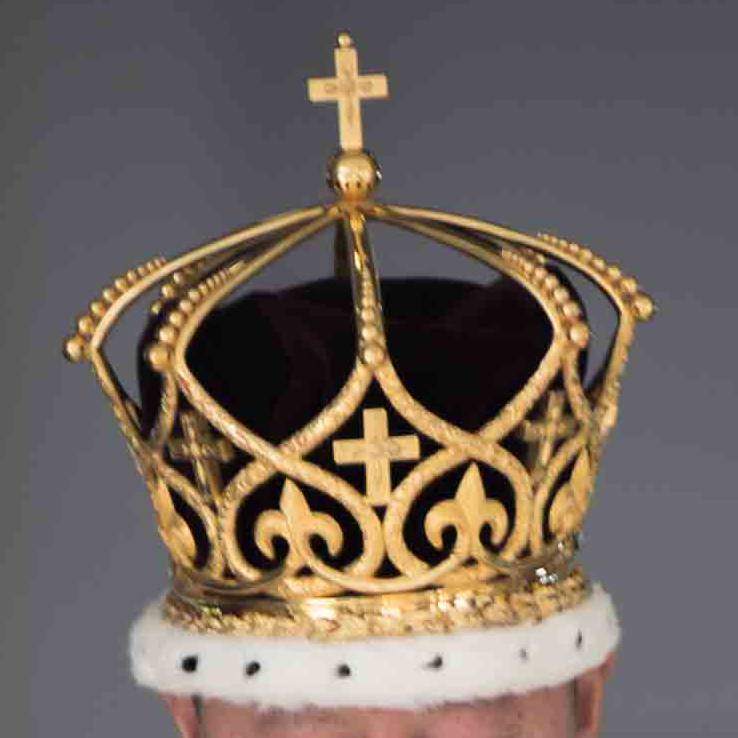
Crown of Tonga.

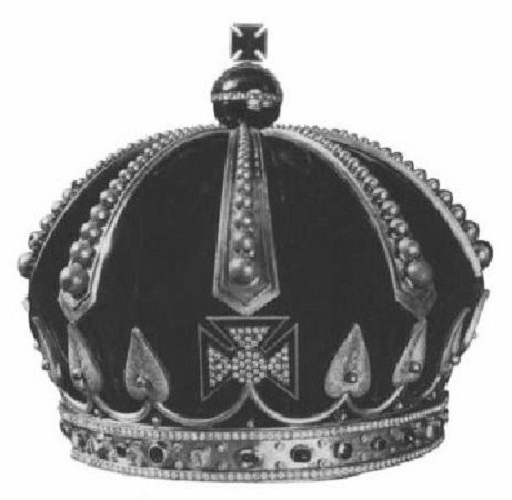
Crown of Hawaii

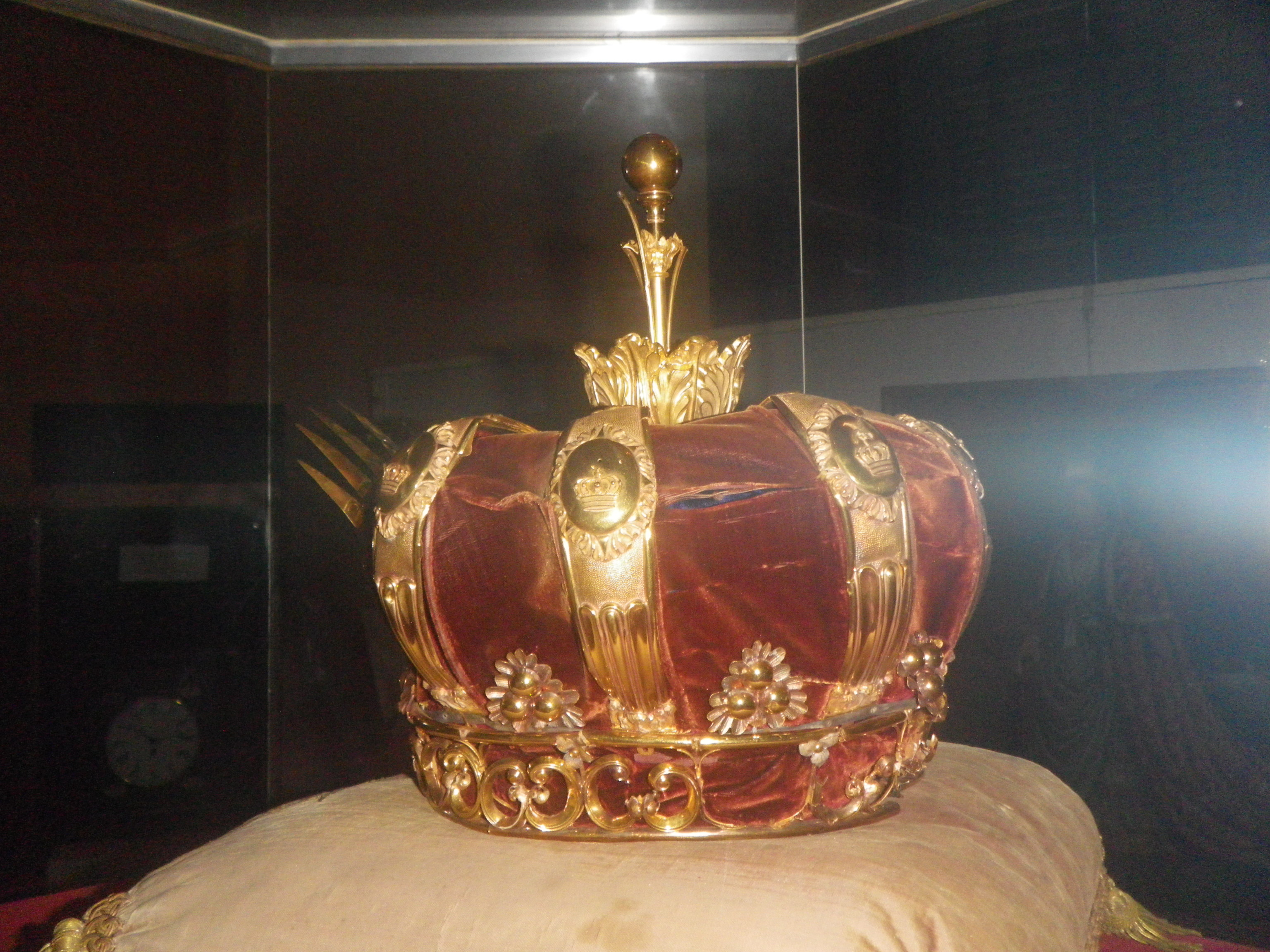
Crown of Madagascar

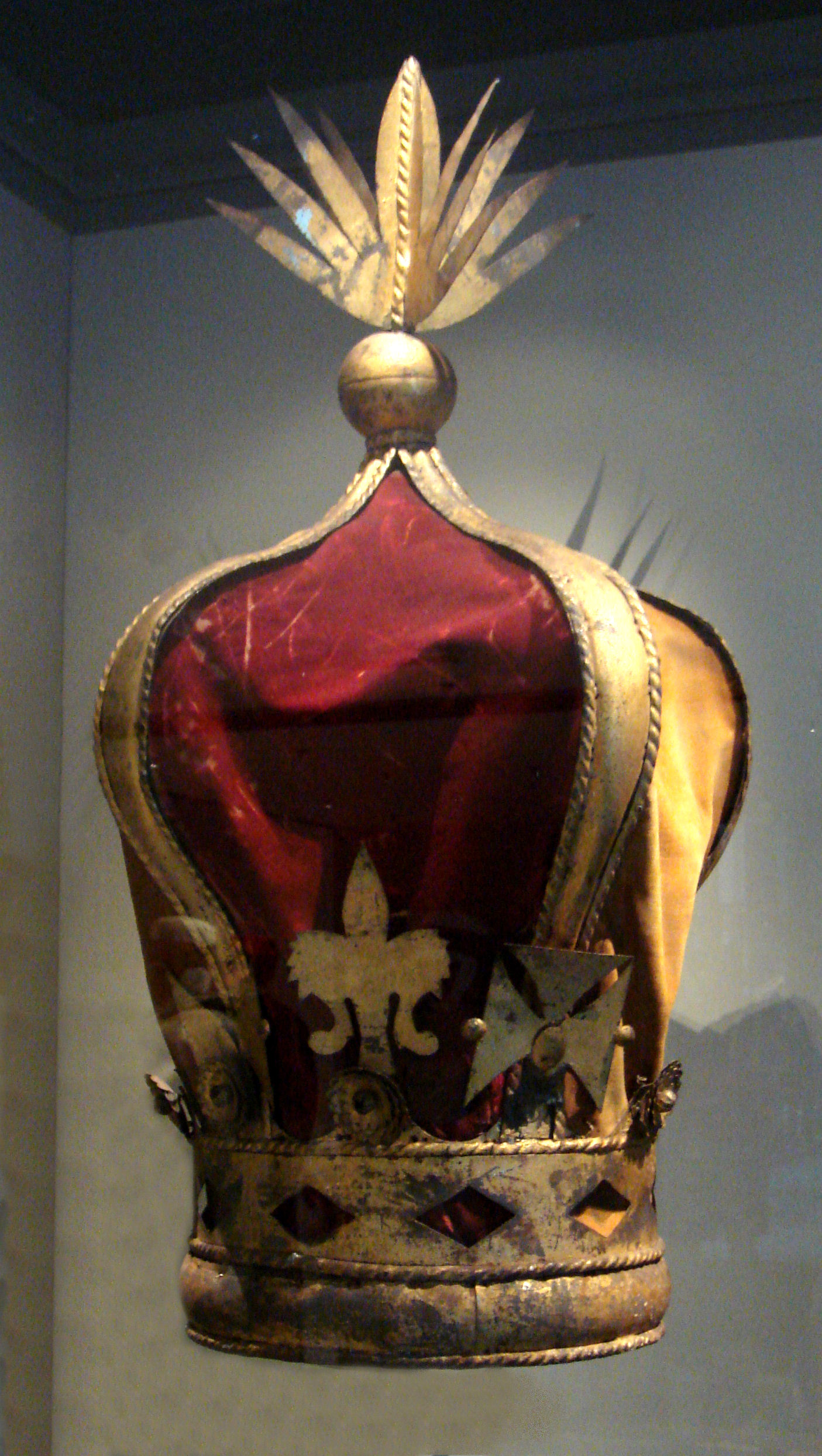
Crown of Ranavalona III

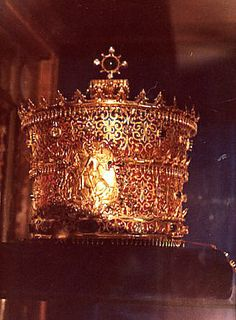
Crown of Ethiopia

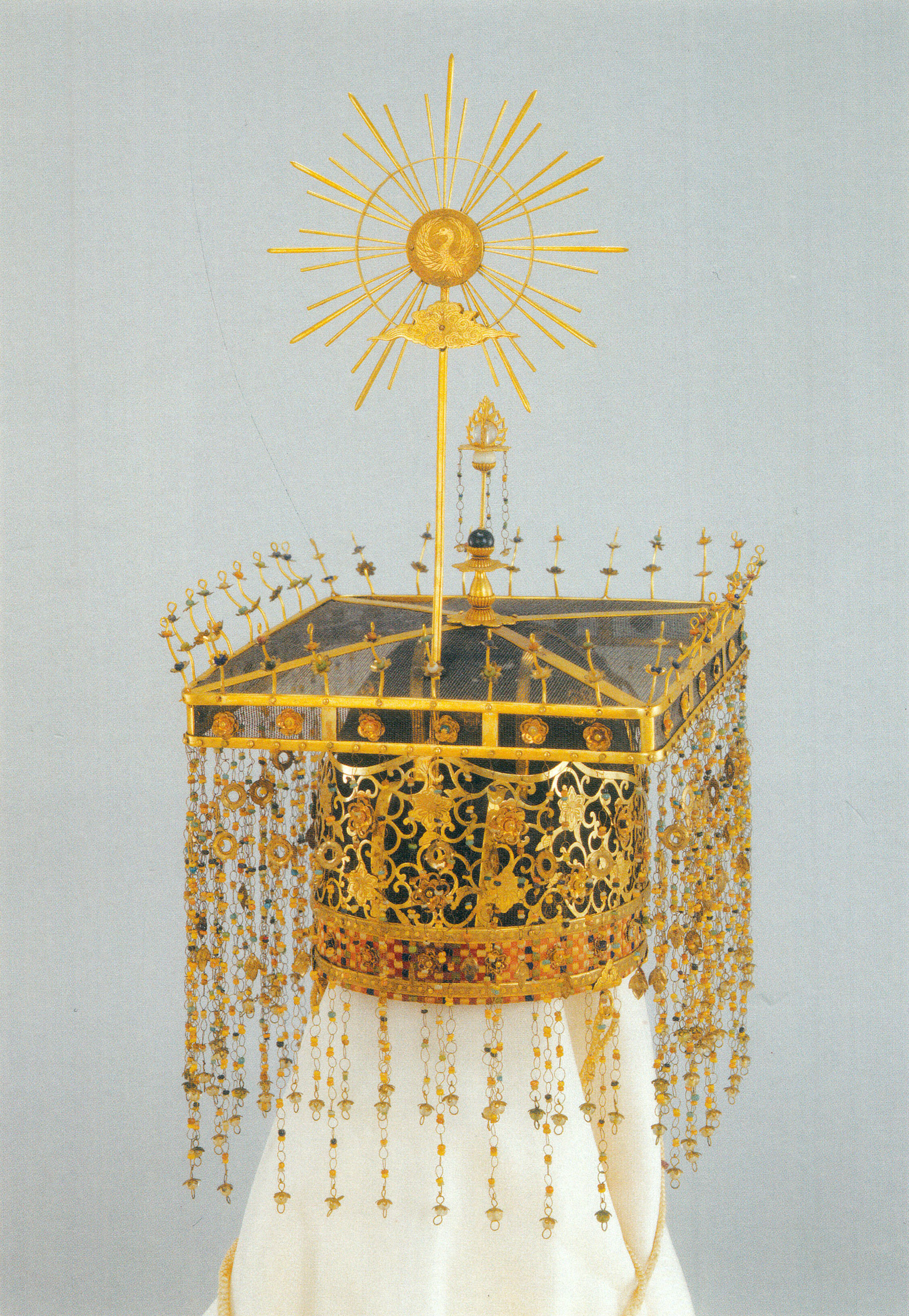
The Imperial crown of Japanese emperor Kōmei (1831–1867).

Imperial crown of Qing

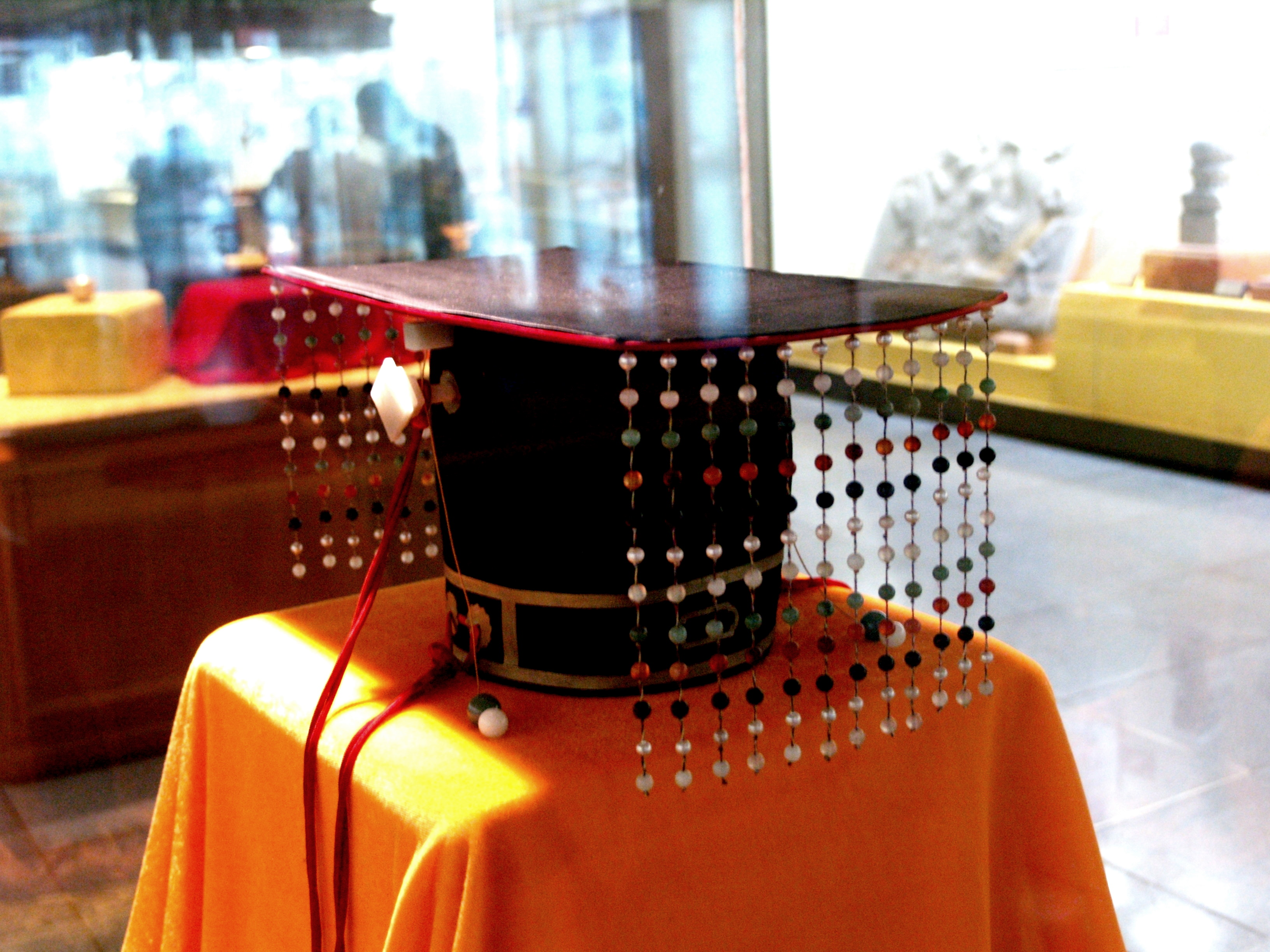
Imperial crown of Ming

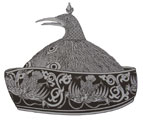
Crown of Kingdom of Bhutan

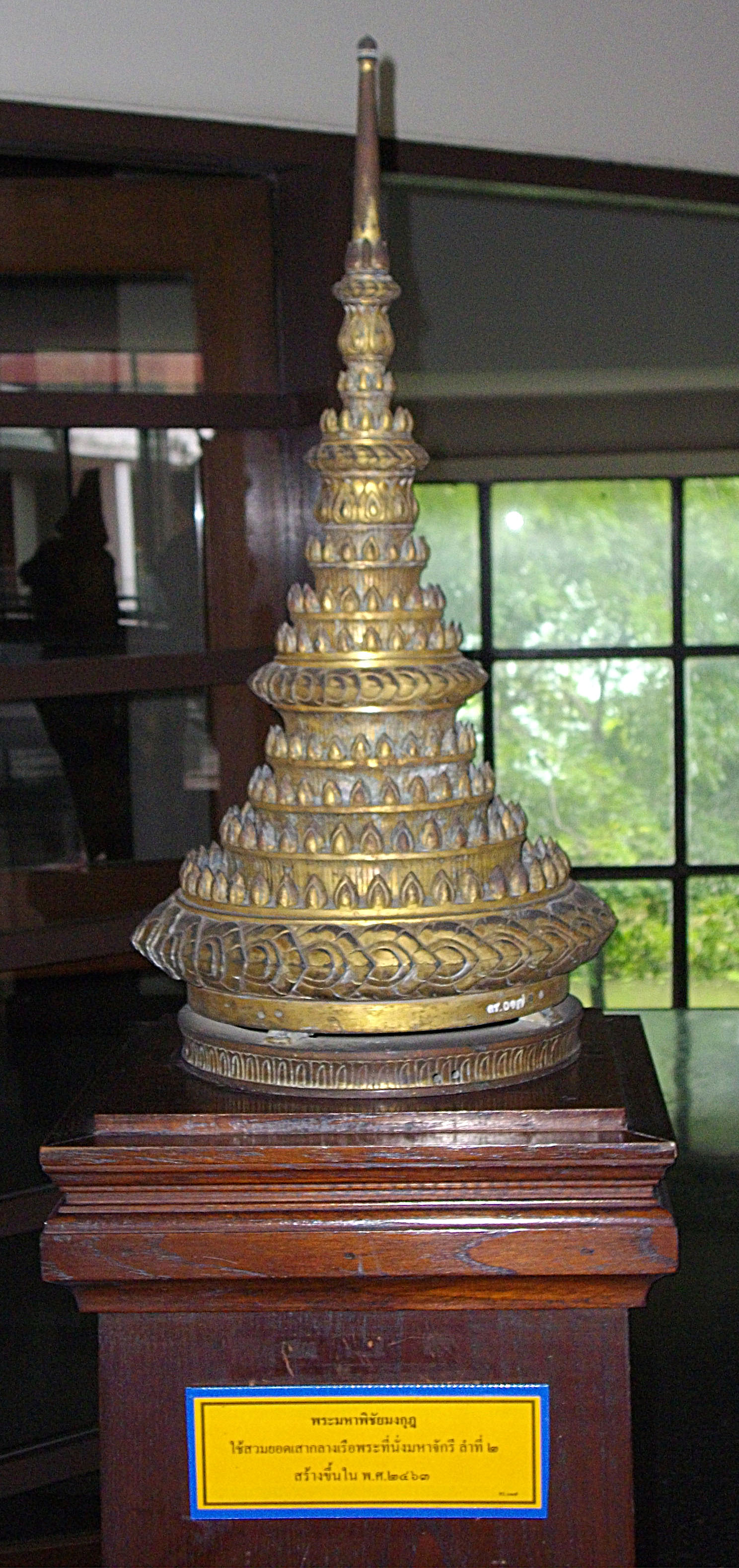
The Great Crown of Victory (Thailand)

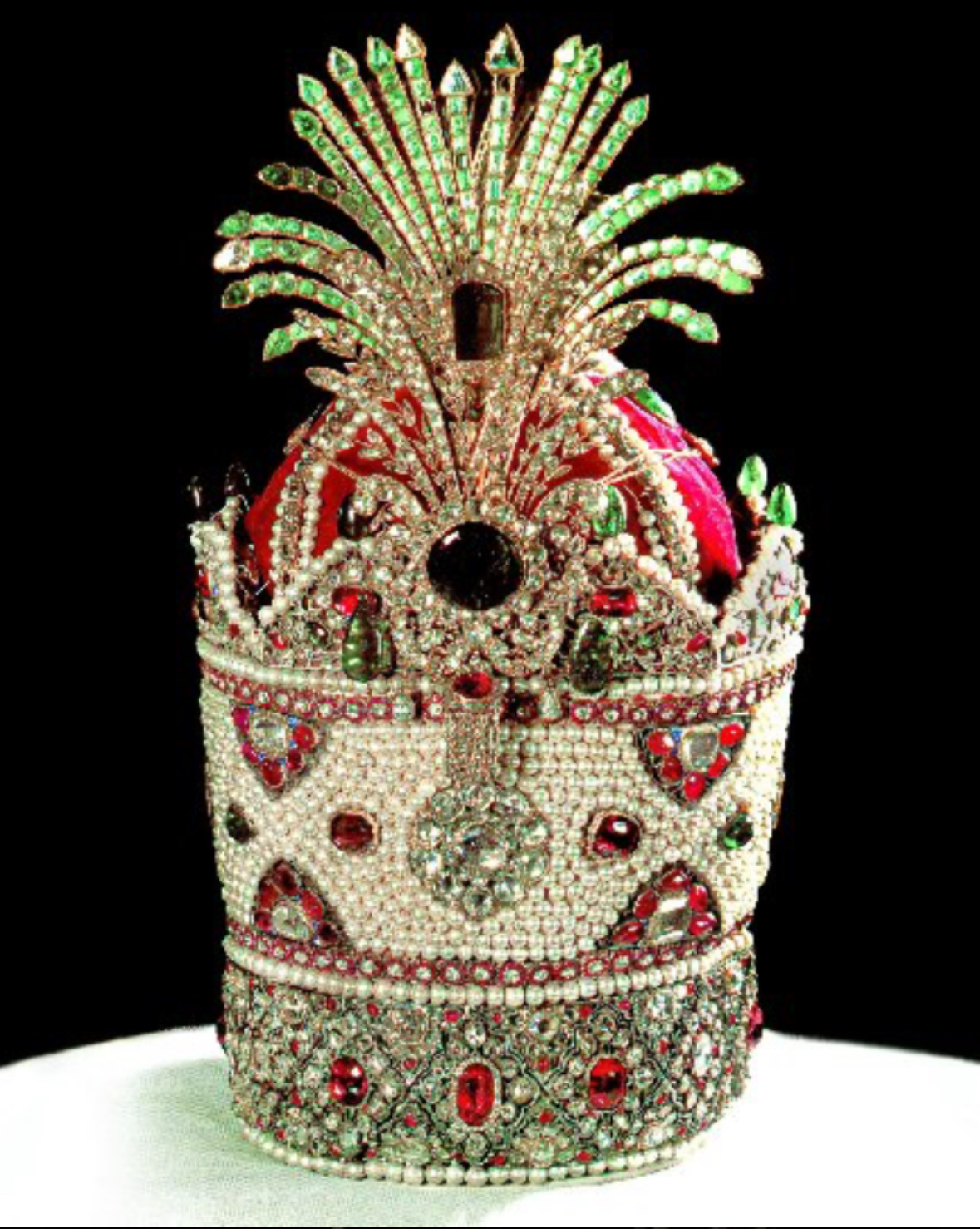
Kiani Crown (Iran-Qajar dynasty)

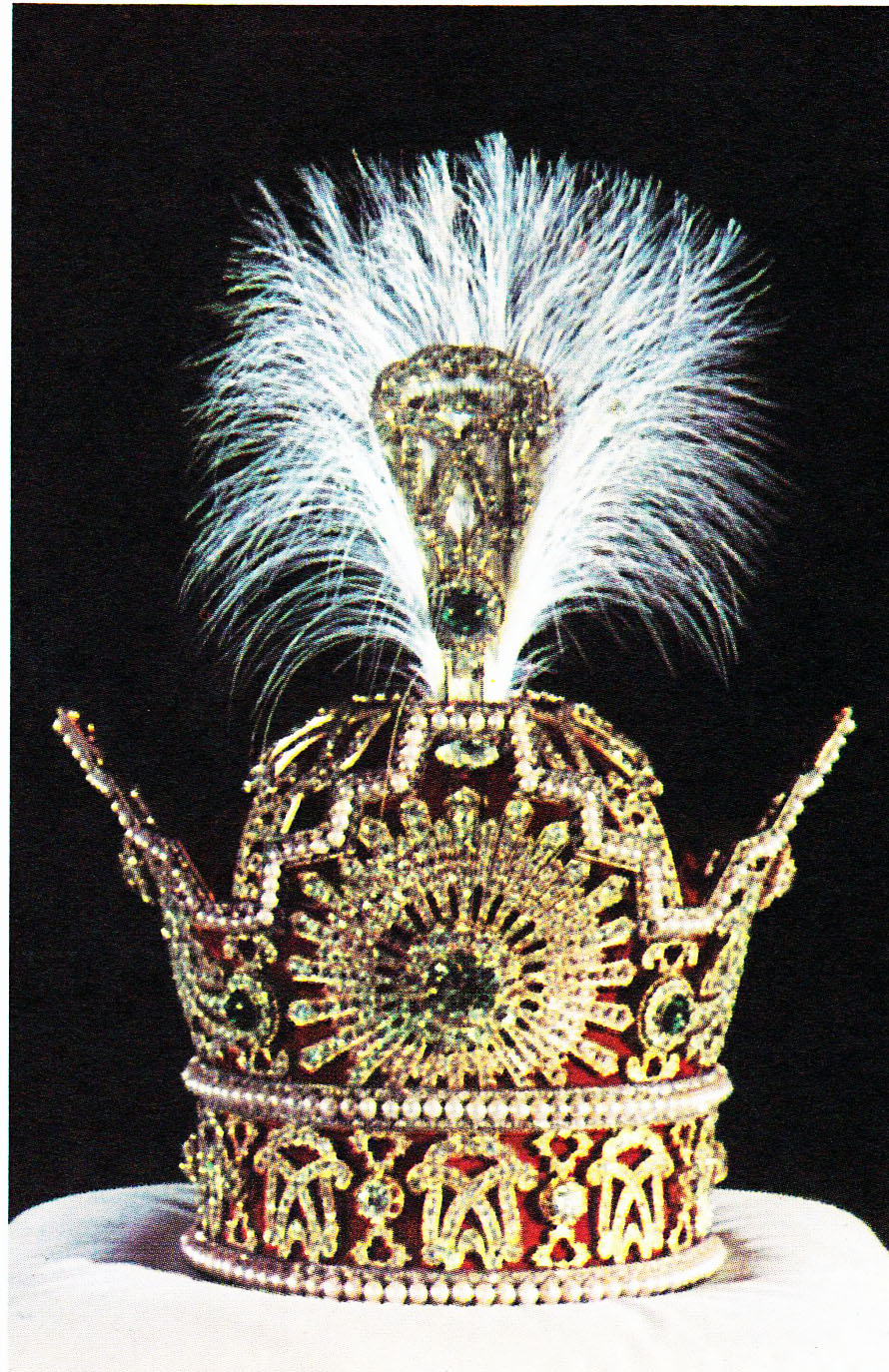
Pahlavi Crown (Iran-Pahlavi dynasty)

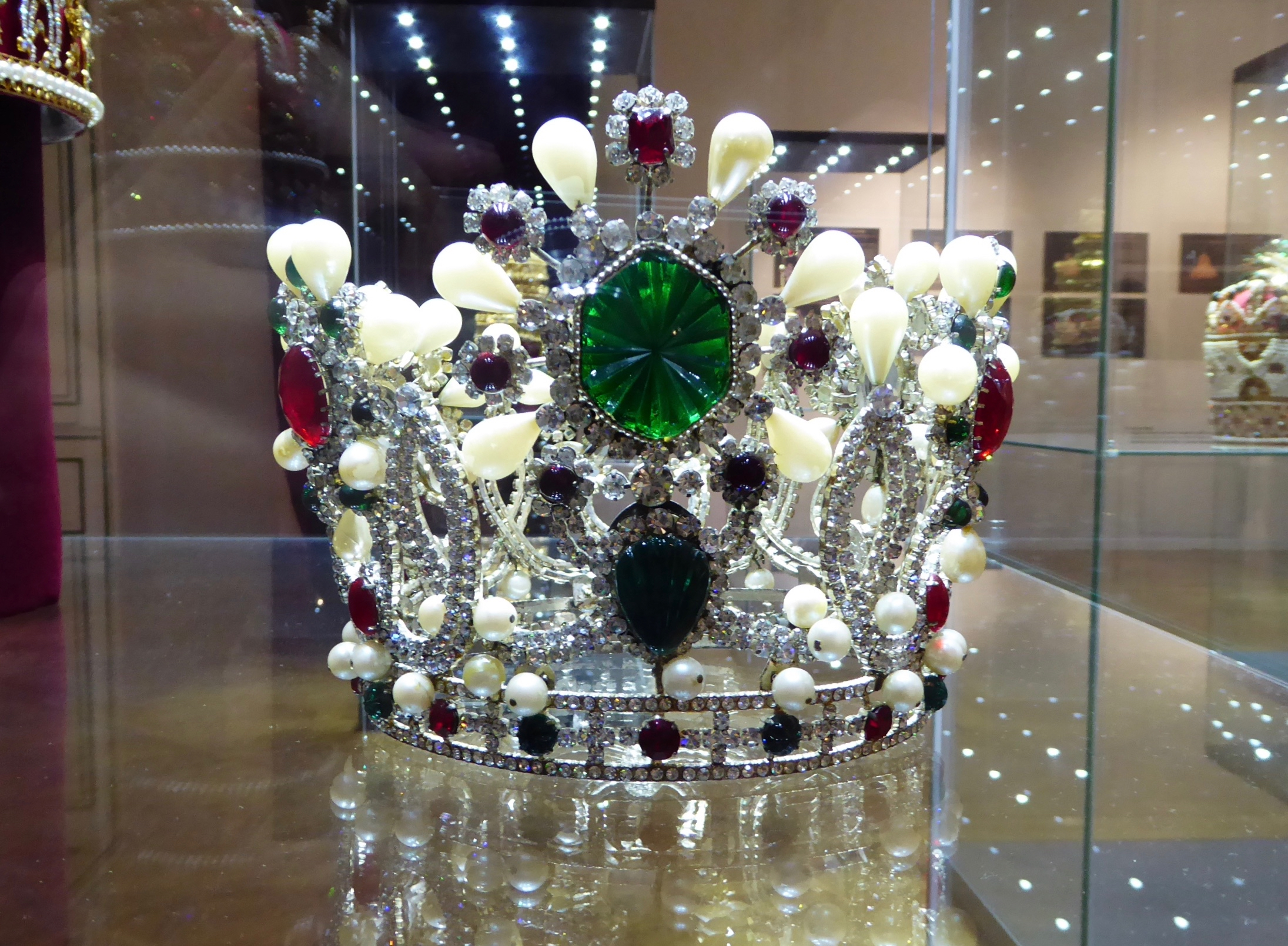
Empress Crown (Iran-Pahlavi dynasty)

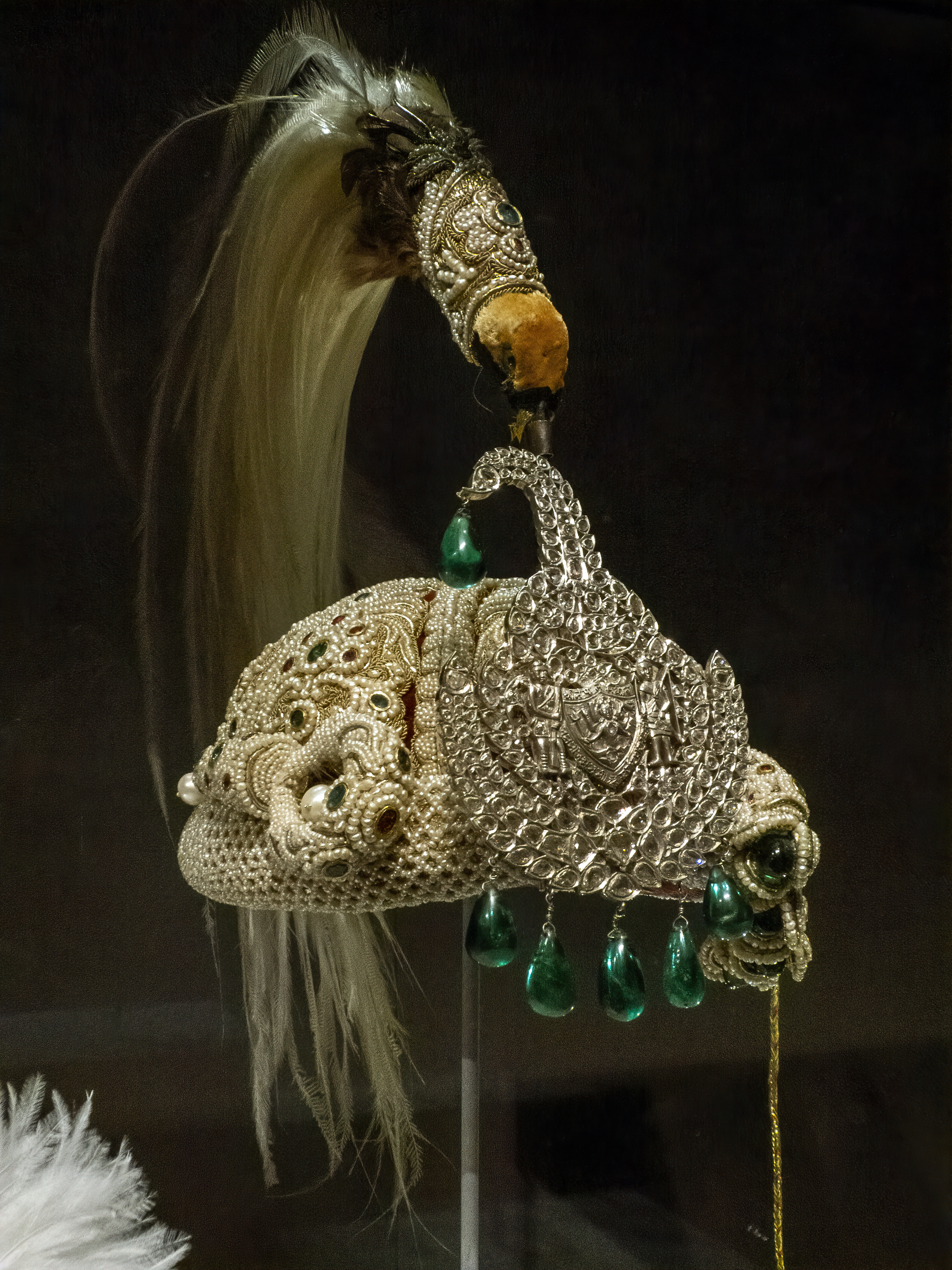
Rana Shripech, the crown of the Rana prime ministers of Kingdom of Nepal.

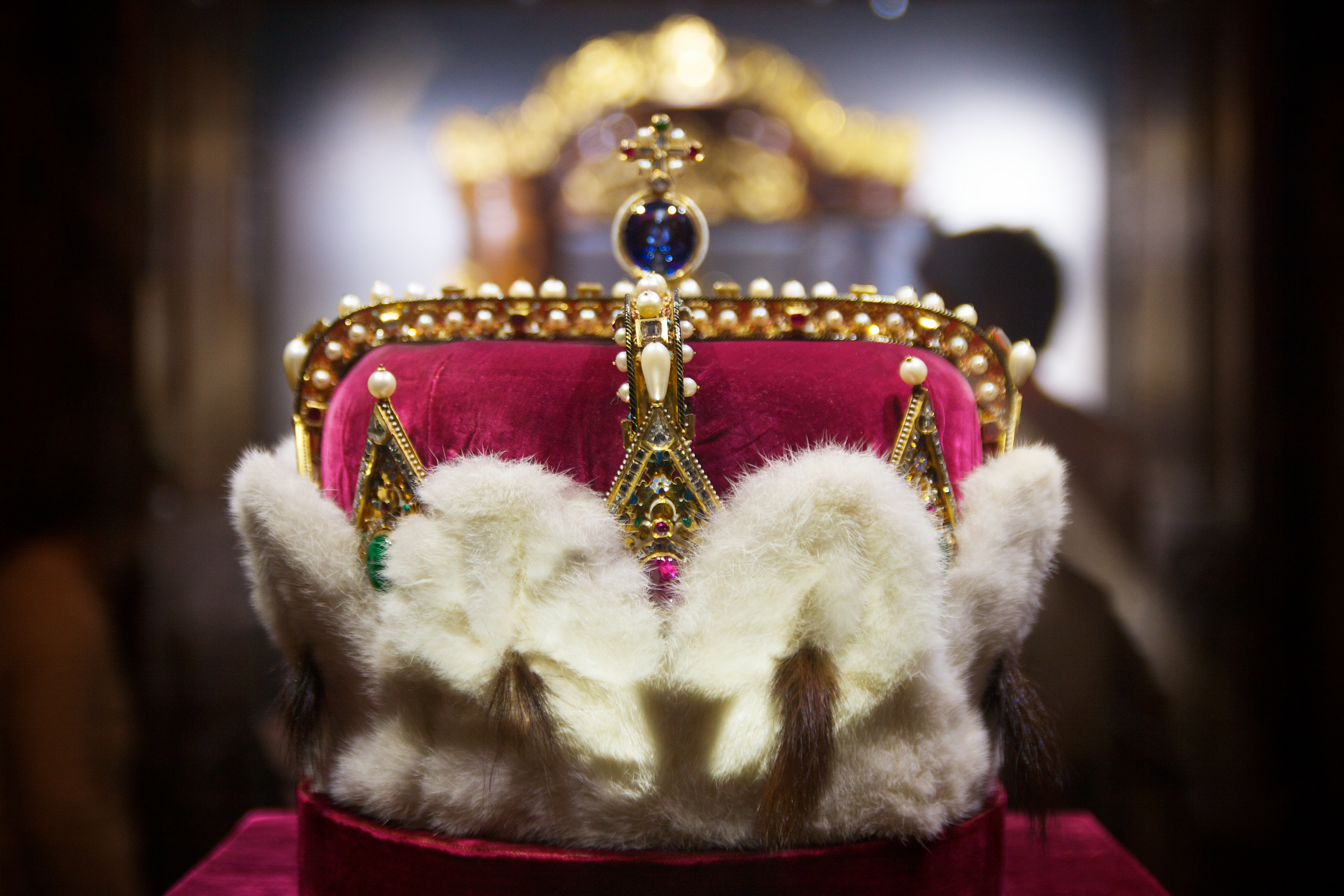
Archducal hat of Austria, c. 1616, Klosterneuburg Monastery

== See also ==
- Benkan
- Circlet
- Coronet
- Crown jewels
- Diadem
- Fengguan
- Guan
- Helmet
- Holy Crown of Hungary (Crown of St. Stephen)
- Hoop crown
- Heraldic crowns
- Imperial Crown
- Korymbos (headgear)
- Laurel wreath
- Makuṭa
- Mianguan
- Mitre
- Goffa
- Nemes
- Oba's crown
- Papal tiara
- Polos
- Presidential sash
- Pschent
- Tiara
- Chada and mongkut
- List of Royal Crowns
- Ukpe-okhue
- War bonnet
- Hat
- Tefillin
