= Coronation of Charles III and Camilla =

2023 coronation in the United Kingdom

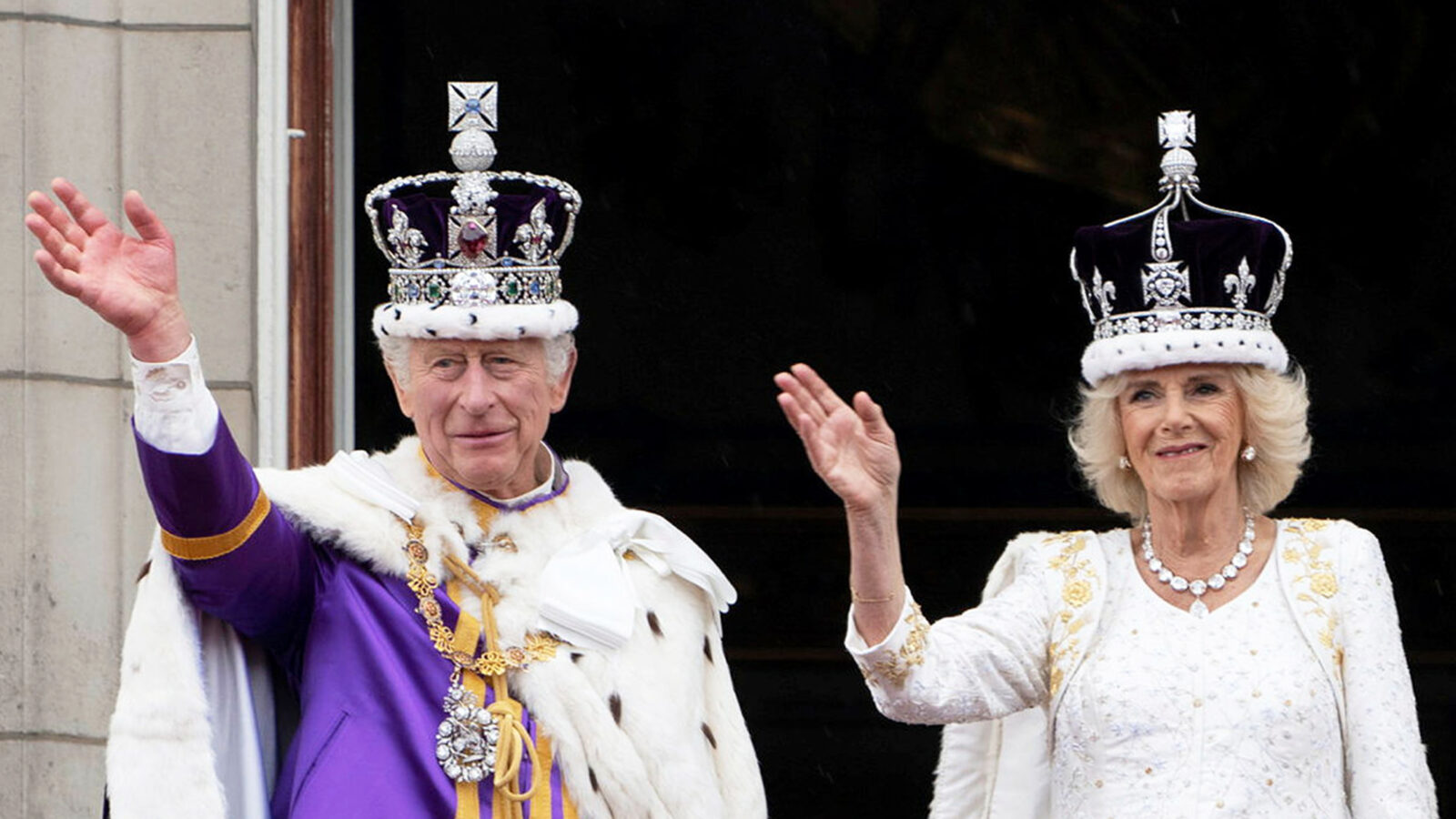
- The King and Queen waving from the balcony of Buckingham Palace following the coronation service
- Date: 6 May 2023; 3 years ago
- Venue: Westminster Abbey
- Location: London, England
- Participants: King Charles III; Queen Camilla; Great Officers of State; Bishops of the Church of England; Selected members of the armed forces of the Commonwealth; Heralds of the College of Arms and the Lyon Court; Selected Peers of the Realm; Faith representatives

The coronation of Charles III and his wife, Camilla, as king and queen of the United Kingdom and the 14 other Commonwealth realms, took place on Saturday, 6 May 2023 at Westminster Abbey. Charles acceded to the throne on 8 September 2022 upon the death of his mother, Elizabeth II.

The ceremony was structured around an Anglican service of Holy Communion. It included the King taking an oath, being anointed with holy oil, and receiving the coronation regalia, emphasising his spiritual role and secular responsibilities. (Note: The monarch of the United Kingdom is the supreme governor of the Church of England and is styled the Defender of the Faith.) Representatives of the Church of England and the British royal family declared their allegiance to him, and people throughout the Commonwealth realms were invited to do so. The Queen was crowned in a shorter and simpler ceremony. After the service, members of the royal family travelled to Buckingham Palace in a state procession and appeared on the palace's rear and front balconies. The service was altered from past British coronations to represent the multiple faiths, cultures, and communities of the United Kingdom, and was shorter than Elizabeth II's coronation. It had a peak UK television audience of 20.4 million, making it the most watched television broadcast of 2023, and attracted a global audience of 2 billion people across 125 countries.

The coronation elicited both celebrations and protest in the United Kingdom, with surveys carried out before the event suggesting that the British public was ambivalent towards the ceremony and its funding by taxpayers. The events in London and Windsor drew large crowds, but were also protested against by smaller republican groups; 64 individuals were arrested on the day. The celebrations included street parties, volunteering, special commemorative church services, and a concert at Windsor Castle on 7 May. The response in the other Commonwealth realms was similarly mixed; while there were many celebrations, some government officials and indigenous groups took the opportunity to voice republican sentiments and call for reparatory justice.

The coronation was the first of a British monarch in the 21st century and 3rd millennium, the previous having been that of Elizabeth II in June 1953, nearly 70 years prior. It was the 40th to be held at Westminster Abbey since the coronation of William the Conqueror in 1066. (Note: King Harold Godwinson was almost certainly crowned at the newly consecrated Westminster Abbey in January 1066, although this is not specifically confirmed by any contemporary source. If Harold's coronation is included, this was the 41st at the abbey.)

== Preparation ==
=== Background ===
Charles III became king immediately upon the death of his mother, Queen Elizabeth II, at 15:10 BST on 8 September 2022. He was proclaimed king by the Accession Council on 10 September, which was followed by proclamations in other Commonwealth realms. Charles's wife, Camilla, became queen consort. During Elizabeth II's reign, planning meetings for Charles's coronation, code-named Operation Golden Orb, were held at least once a year, attended by representatives of the UK government, the Church of England, and Charles's staff.

=== Service and procession ===
The organisation of the coronation was the responsibility of the earl marshal, the Duke of Norfolk. A committee of privy counsellors arranged the event. In October 2022, the date of the coronation was announced as 6 May 2023, a choice made to ensure sufficient time to mourn the death of Elizabeth II before holding the ceremony.

A Coronation Claims Office was established within the Cabinet Office to handle claims to perform a historic or ceremonial role at the coronation, replacing the Court of Claims. The posts of Lord High Steward and Lord High Constable of England, which are now only named for coronations, were given to General Sir Gordon Messenger and Admiral Sir Tony Radakin, respectively.

The holy anointing oil used in the service was consecrated at the Church of the Holy Sepulchre on 3 March 2023 by Greek Orthodox Patriarch Theophilos III of Jerusalem and Anglican Archbishop Hosam Naoum of Jerusalem. It was based on the same formula as the oil used in the coronation of Elizabeth II, but without animal products such as civet.

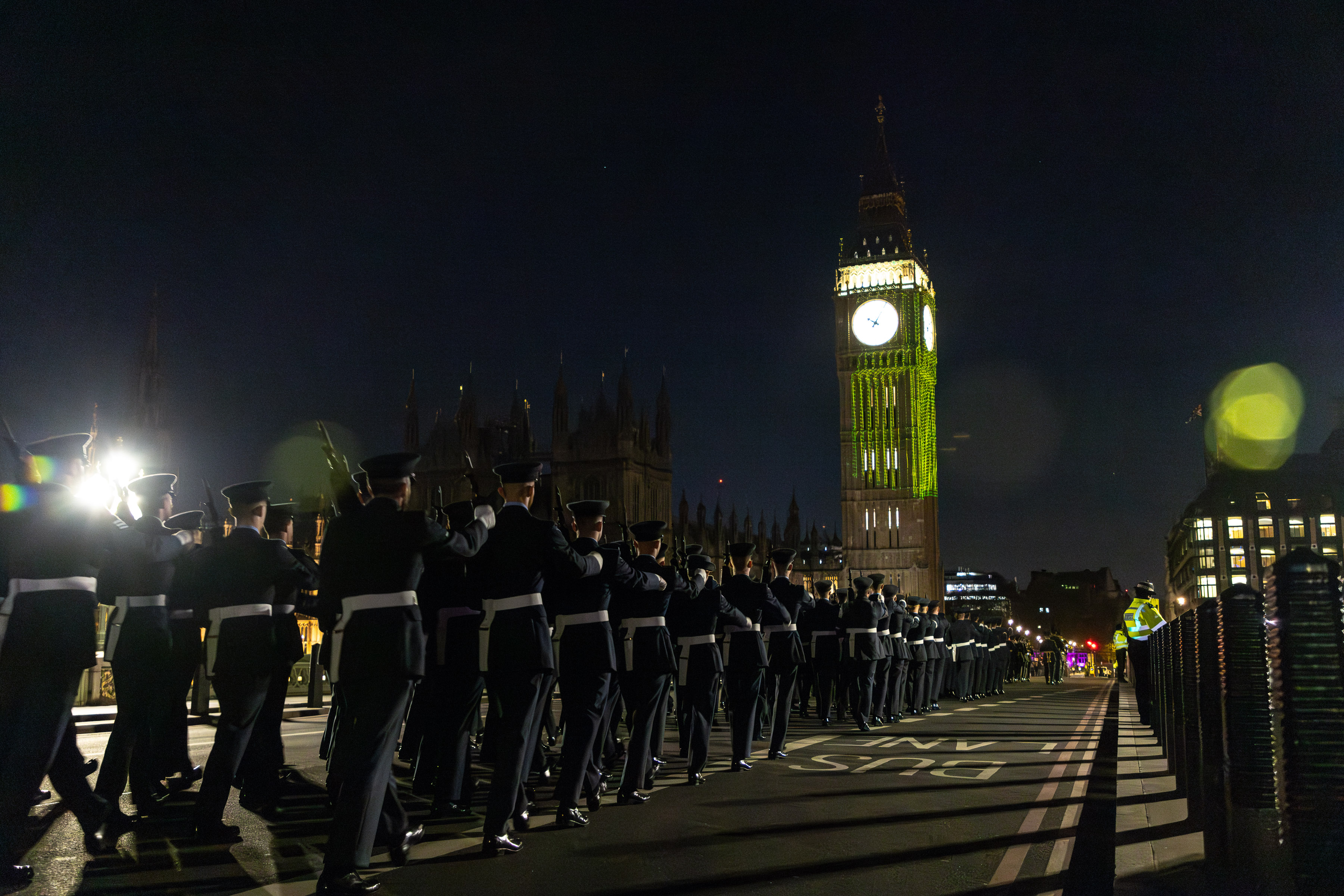
Members of the British Armed Forces conduct a rehearsal on 2 May

Military dress rehearsals took place on 17, 18, and 19 April. The King and Queen, the Prince and Princess of Wales and their children, and the Princess Royal attended coronation rehearsals at Westminster Abbey on 3 May.

Westminster Abbey was closed to tourists and worshippers from 25 April for preparations, and did not re-open until 8 May. As at previous coronations, many attendees had an obscured view, as the abbey's nave was filled to capacity. However, on this occasion some television screens were installed in the nave to mitigate this.

=== Guests ===
Countries that sent representatives

The coronation was a state event funded by the British government, which also decided the guest list. Approximately 2,200 guests from 203 countries were invited. They included members of the British royal family, representatives from the Church of England and other British faith communities, prominent politicians from the United Kingdom and the Commonwealth, and foreign heads of state.

The number of British political attendees was reduced significantly from 1953, when virtually the entire Parliament of the United Kingdom attended. Invitations were extended to 850 community and charity representatives, including 450 British Empire Medal recipients and 400 young persons, half of whom were nominated by the government. Following a tradition dating from 1189, fourteen barons of the Cinque Ports were also invited. Safety regulations at Westminster Abbey restricted the number of guests, as in contrast to earlier coronations no temporary stands were erected in the building.

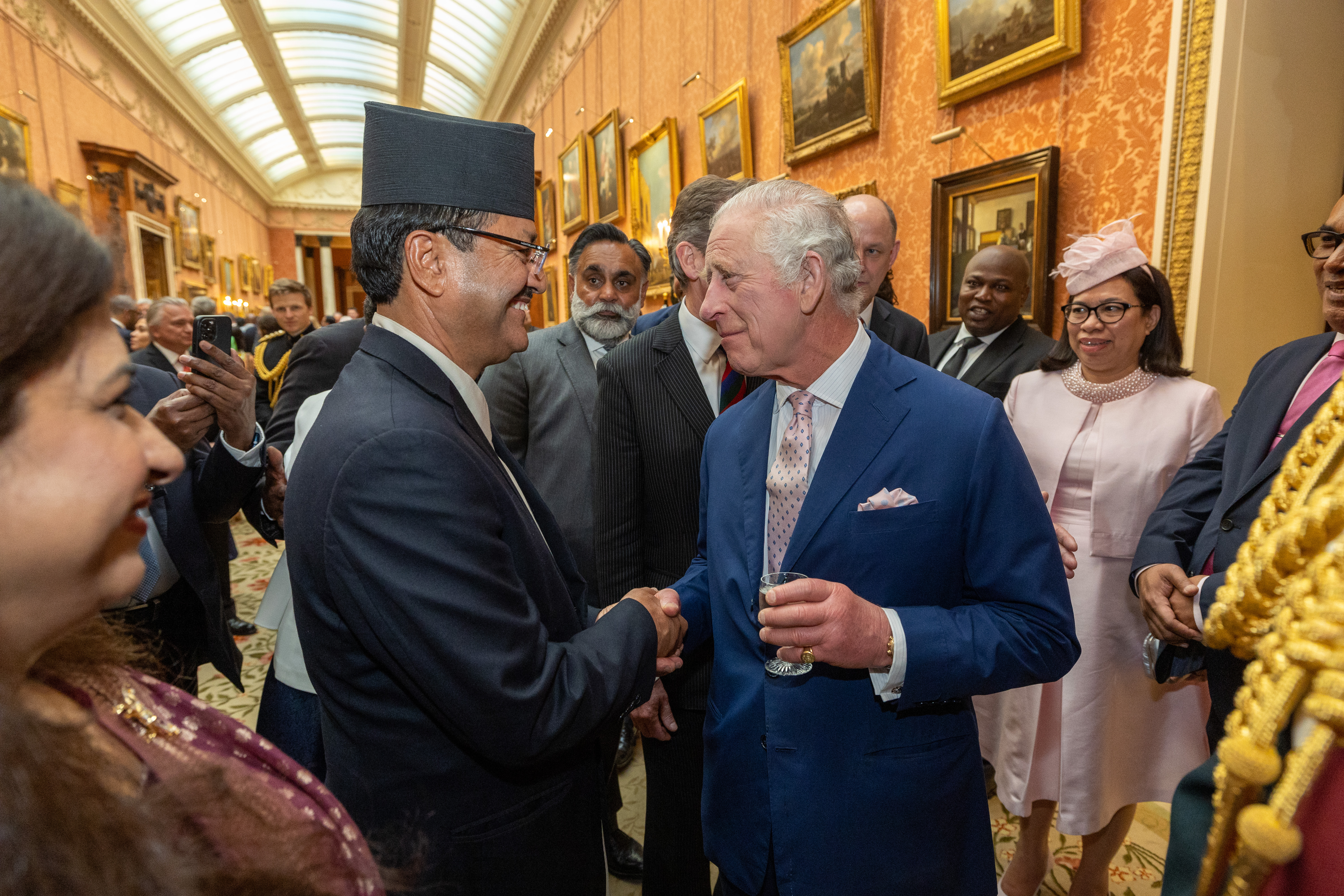
The King meeting with foreign dignitaries at a reception in the Picture Gallery of Buckingham Palace on 5 May

Many dignitaries invited to the coronation service also attended related gatherings, including receptions hosted by the King on 5 May at Marlborough House for leaders of the Commonwealth of Nations, and at Buckingham Palace for foreign royalty and other overseas dignitaries. Family members and guests also attended a reception at the exclusive private members' club Oswald's.

=== Vestments and crowns ===
In a break with tradition, Charles's coronation vestments were largely reused from previous coronations instead of being newly made. While it is customary for the supertunica and Robe Royal to be reused, the King also wore vestments used by George IV, George V, George VI, and Elizabeth II. The Queen similarly reused vestments, including Elizabeth II's robe of state, but also wore a new robe of estate featuring her cypher, bees, a beetle, and various plants and flowers. She also wore a new coronation gown, created by Bruce Oldfield and embroidered with wildflowers, the United Kingdom's floral emblems, her cypher, images of her two rescue dogs, and her children and grandchildren's names.

St Edward's Crown, which was used to crown the King, was removed from the Tower of London in December 2022 for resizing. In February 2023 Queen Mary's Crown, which was used to crown the Queen, was also removed from display to be reset with Cullinan III, IV and V and for four of its eight detachable half-arches to be removed. The Crown of Queen Elizabeth The Queen Mother was not used, to avoid a potential diplomatic dispute with India; the crown contains the Koh-i-Noor diamond, which is claimed by India.

The dress code for peers without a role in the ceremony was originally lounge suits or parliamentary robes, rather than the coronets, coronation robes, and court dress traditionally worn. This was changed in the week before the coronation after protests, with peers allowed to wear coronation robes but not coronets. The general dress code for men was morning dress, a lounge suit, formal military uniform or national dress.

=== Art ===
Invitation to the coronation of King Charles III and Queen Camilla

The official photographer of the coronation was Hugo Burnand, who had previously been the official photographer for Charles and Camilla's wedding in 2005. Eileen Hogan was selected to paint the coronation ceremony, and Peter Kuhfeld and Paul Benney to paint the coronation portraits of the King and Queen respectively. Three alumni of the Royal Drawing School, Fraser Scarfe, Phoebe Stannard and Gideon Summerfield, were picked to document the procession.

The United Kingdom coronation emblem

Andrew Jamieson was commissioned to create the coronation invitation, which featured the couple's coats of arms, the floral emblems of the United Kingdom, and a Green Man amid other British wildflowers and wildlife. The coronation emblem was designed by Jony Ive with his creative collective LoveFrom, and depicts the floral emblems of the United Kingdom in the shape of St Edward's Crown. There are versions of the emblem in both English and Welsh.

The procession into the abbey was led by the Cross of Wales, a new processional cross commissioned by Charles to mark the centenary of the Church in Wales. It includes relics of the True Cross gifted to the King by Pope Francis. The screen which concealed the King during his anointing was designed by iconographer Aidan Hart and embroidered by the Royal School of Needlework. It includes 56 leaves embroidered with the names of the members of the Commonwealth of Nations.

The Poet Laureate of the United Kingdom, Simon Armitage, released a new poem, An Unexpected Guest, to mark the coronation. The poem follows a woman invited to attend the coronation in Westminster Abbey, and quotes Samuel Pepys' experience at the coronation of Charles II in 1661.

In a tradition dating back to the coronation of King Edward II in 1308, the official account of the event, the Coronation Roll, was presented to the King and Queen on 3 May 2024. The roll of hand-stitched paper is 21 metres long and contains 11,500 words, crafted by calligrapher Stephanie von Werthern-Gill and illustrated by Timothy Noad. The roll will be kept with its predecessors at The National Archives, but has been digitised and is accessible online.

=== Music ===
Twelve new pieces were commissioned for the service and used alongside older works, including several used at previous coronations.

Six of the new commissions were performed by the orchestra before the service — those by Judith Weir; Sir Karl Jenkins; a vocal piece by Sarah Class performed by Pretty Yende; Nigel Hess, Roderick Williams, and Shirley J. Thompson; Iain Farrington; and a new march by Patrick Doyle. New compositions by Roxanna Panufnik, Tarik O'Regan, and Andrew Lloyd Webber were part of the service, and Debbie Wiseman composed two related pieces, one of which was performed by the Ascension Choir.

Existing works by William Byrd, George Frideric Handel, William Boyce, Edward Elgar, Walford Davies, William Walton, Hubert Parry, and Ralph Vaughan Williams were included, as they had been at previous coronations. Six pieces were performed in new arrangements by John Rutter.

In tribute to the King's 64-year tenure as Prince of Wales the Kyrie was set in Welsh by Paul Mealor and was sung by Sir Bryn Terfel. Psalm 71 was chanted to in Greek by a Byzantine choir, which was included in the service in tribute to the King's father, Prince Philip, Duke of Edinburgh, who was born a prince of Greece.

The director of music for the coronation was Andrew Nethsingha, the organist and master of the choristers at the abbey. During the service, the organ was played by Peter Holder, and before the service by Matthew Jorysz. Before the service, John Eliot Gardiner conducted the Monteverdi Choir and English Baroque Soloists. The main choir was a combination of the choirs of Westminster Abbey, the Chapel Royal, the octet from the Monteverdi Choir, Methodist College Belfast Girls' Choir and Truro Cathedral Girls' Choir. The orchestra players were drawn from the Philharmonia Orchestra, Royal Philharmonic Orchestra, BBC National Orchestra of Wales, Regina Symphony Orchestra, English Chamber Orchestra, Scottish Chamber Orchestra, Royal Opera House Orchestra and Welsh National Opera Orchestra, which are all patronised by Charles. The orchestra, situated in the organ loft, was conducted by Antonio Pappano and led by Vasko Vasilev. The State Trumpeters of the Household Cavalry and the Fanfare Trumpeters of the Royal Air Force played the fanfares.

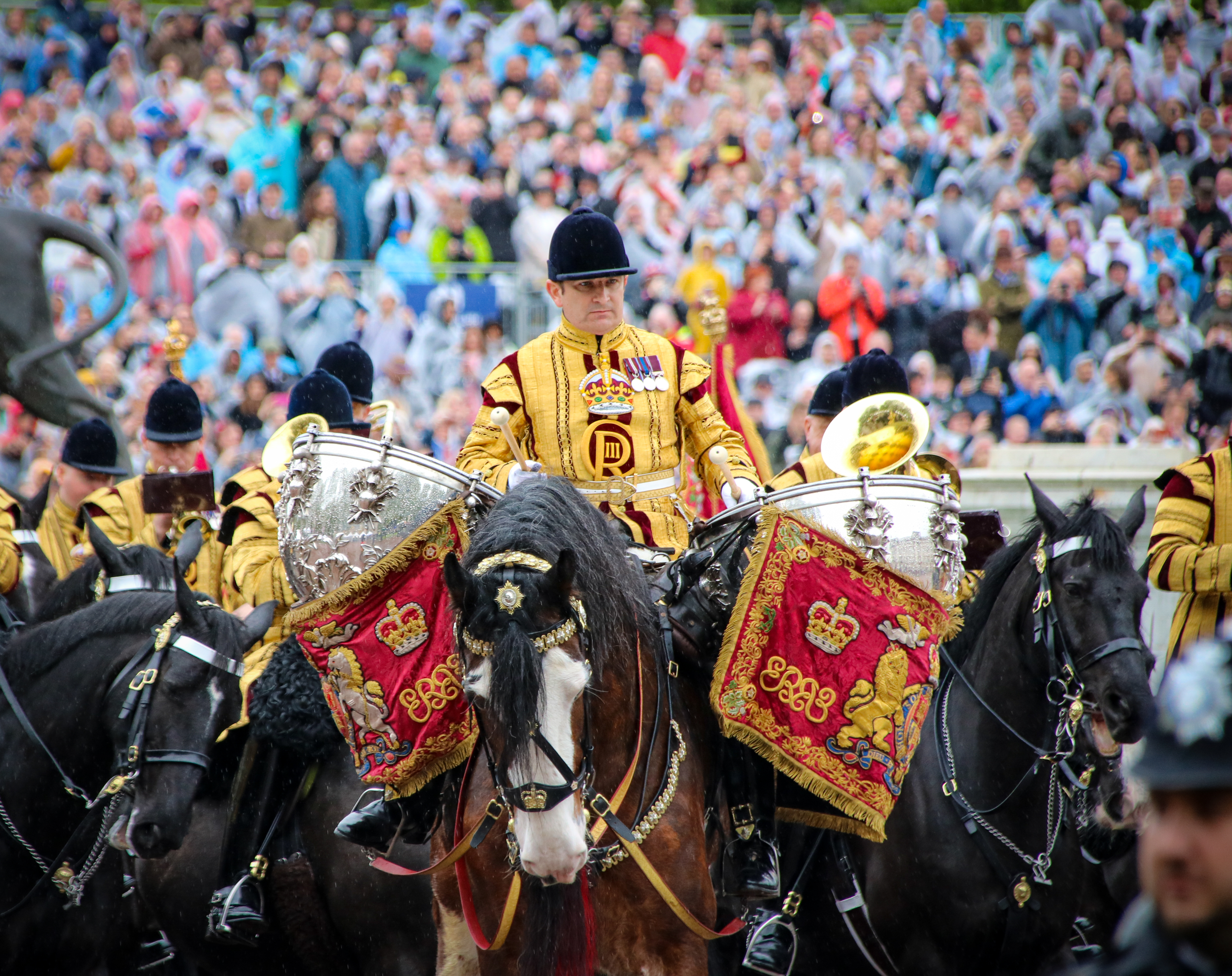
Percussionists of the Mounted Band of the Household Cavalry during the procession to Buckingham Palace

All eight of the massed bands in the coronation procession played the same music, keeping time with each other with the help of a radio broadcast click track – the first time such technology has been used in such a large-scale ceremonial event; previously bands would march to different pieces of music starting at different times. The tempo set was 108 beats per minute, slowed down from the regulation 116 beats per minute because of the size of the bands.

An official coronation album, which includes all music and spoken word from the pre-service and service was recorded and released by Decca Records after the ceremony.

List of music played at the coronation service
Title of piece	Composer	Notes
Opening voluntary
Magnificat in D Major	Johann Sebastian Bach	
Sunday After New Year	Bach	
Singet dem Herrn ein neues Lied	Bach	
Ecce sacerdos magnus	Anton Bruckner	
Alla breve in D Major	Bach	
Brighter Visions Shine Afar	Judith Weir	New composition
Jupiter, the Bringer of Jollity	Gustav Holst (arranged by Iain Farrington)	
Tros y Garreg ("Crossing the Stone")	Karl Jenkins	New arrangement
Sacred Fire	Sarah Class	New composition; lyrics by Grahame Davies
Crown Imperial	William Walton (arranged by John Rutter)	New arrangement; composed for the coronation of George VI
Fantasia on Greensleeves	Ralph Vaughan Williams	
Be Thou My Vision	Nigel Hess, Roderick Williams, Shirley Thompson	New composition
Voices of the World	Farrington	New composition
King Charles III Coronation March	Patrick Doyle	New composition
Trumpet Tune	Henry Purcell (arranged by Rutter)	New arrangement
The Arrival of the Queen of Sheba	George Frideric Handel	
Oh, had I Jubal's lyre	Handel	
Care selve	Handel	
Nimrod	Edward Elgar (arranged by Farrington)	New arrangement
Flourish for an Occasion	William Henry Harris	
Prelude on Rhosymedre	Vaughan Williams	
During the service
Fanfare for the Arrival of Their Majesties	Christopher Robinson	New composition
I was glad	Hubert Parry (arranged by Rutter)	New arrangement; Parry version used since coronation of Edward VII
Kyrie Eleison	Paul Mealor	New composition; sung in Welsh
The Recognition	Robinson	New composition
Prevent Us, O Lord	William Byrd	
Gloria	Byrd	
Alleluia (O Clap Your Hands)	Debbie Wiseman	New composition
Alleluia (O Sing Praises)	Wiseman	New composition
Veni Creator Spiritus	Traditional	English text by John Cosin for the coronation of Charles I
Zadok the Priest	Handel	Composed for the coronation of George II
Give The King Your Judgements		Byzantine Chant
Wiener Philharmoniker Fanfare	Richard Strauss (arranged by Mealor)	New arrangement
O Lord, Grant the King a Long Life	Thomas Weelkes	Probably composed for the coronation of James I
Homage Fanfare	Robinson	
Confortare	Walford Davies (arranged by Rutter)	New arrangement, composed for the coronation of George VI
Make A Joyful Noise	Andrew Lloyd Webber	New composition
Christ Is Made The Sure Foundation	Purcell (arranged by James O'Donnell)	
Coronation Sanctus	Roxanna Panufnik	New composition
Coronation Agnus Dei	Tarik O'Regan	New composition
Threefold Amen	Orlando Gibbons	Previously sung at the coronations of Edward VII and George V
Praise, My Soul the King of Heaven	J. Goss (arranged by Robinson)	New arrangement
The King Shall Rejoice: Opening Chorus	William Boyce	Composed for the coronation of George III
Coronation Te Deum	Walton (arranged by Rutter)	New arrangement, composed for the coronation of Elizabeth II
God Save the King	(arranged by Gordon Jacob)	
Closing voluntary
Pomp and Circumstance March No. 4 in G	Elgar (arranged by Farrington)	New arrangement
March from the Birds	Parry (arranged by Rutter)	New arrangement
Chorale Fantasia on "The Old Hundredth"	Parry	
Earl of Oxford's March	Byrd (arranged by Matthew Knight)	

List of music played at the state procession to Buckingham Palace
March	Composer
Coronation Bells	W. Partridge
The Bond Of Friendship	Lt Col J. Mackenzie-Rogan
Holyrood	Maj, K.J.Alford
The Great Little Army	Maj. K.J. Alford
The King's Company	Capt B. Mason
Under The White Ensign	Lt Col Sir F.V. Dunn
Scarlet and Gold	L. Thomas
The Kings Guard	J.H. Keith

=== Cost ===
As a state event, the event was paid for by the British government as well as Buckingham Palace through the Sovereign Grant and Privy Purse. Costs incurred by the Sovereign Grant for the Coronation came to £800,000 although that didn't include security and military costs which were paid by the government. The Department for Digital, Culture, Media and Sport stated that it was "unable to give costs, or a breakdown of funding" until after the coronation, but unofficial estimates of £50 million to £250 million have been reported. In November 2024 the Department for Culture, Media and Sport released figures showing that it had spent just over £50 million in its role coordinating the event, while the Home Office paid £22 million in policing costs, totalling £72 million government spend on the Coronation.

The cost of the coronation was criticised by the campaign group Republic and the Scottish National Party MP Ronnie Cowan in light of the ongoing cost-of-living crisis in the United Kingdom. In comparison, Elizabeth II's coronation cost £912,000 in 1953, equating to £20.5 million in May 2023, while George VI's cost £454,000 in 1937, equating to £24.8 million in May 2023. George VI's coronation prior to the coronation of Charles III and Camilla was the most expensive in the last 300 years. The elevated expenses for the 2023 coronation has been partly attributed to the increased cost for security measures.

== Coronation service ==
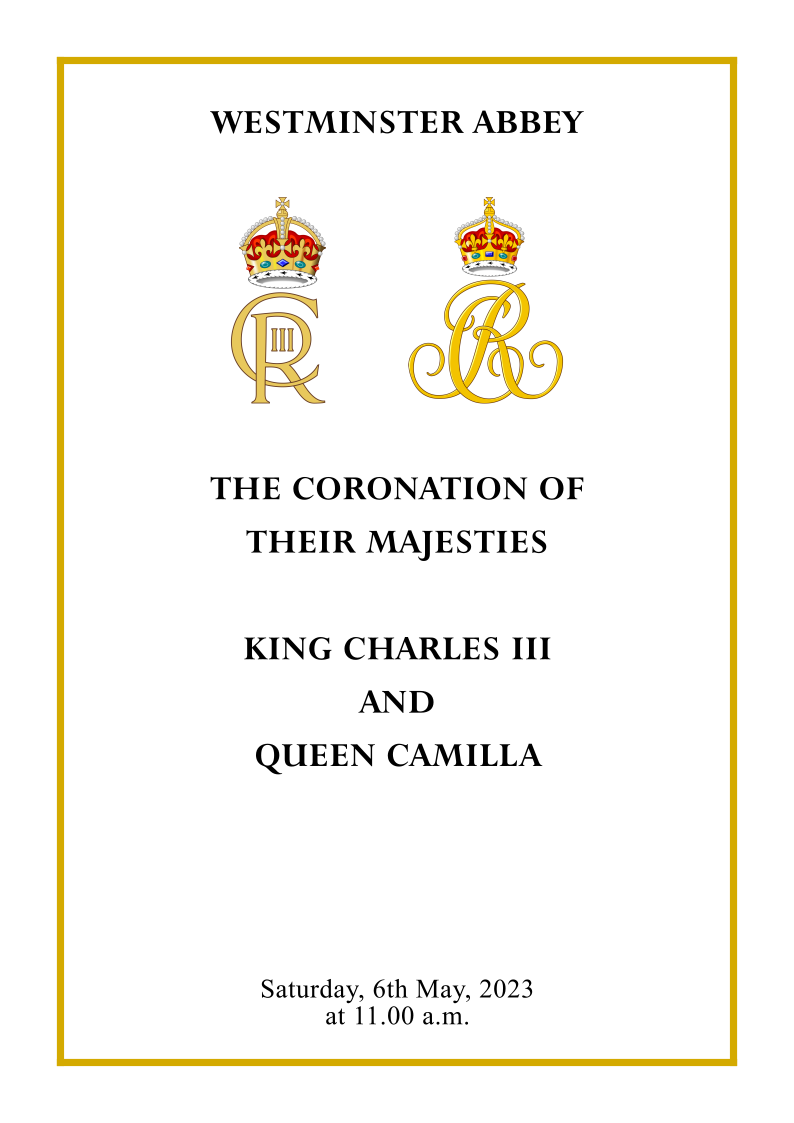
Coronation Order of Service front page

The events of coronation day included a procession from Buckingham Palace to Westminster Abbey, the coronation service itself, a procession back to Buckingham Palace, and an appearance by the King and Queen, with other members of the royal family, on the palace balcony for a flypast by the Royal Air Force.

The coronation was conducted by the Church of England and contained several distinct elements, which were structured around a service of Holy Communion. The King and Queen first proceeded into the abbey, then the King was presented to the people and recognised as monarch. After this the King took an oath stating that he will uphold the law and maintain the Church of England. He then was anointed with holy oil, invested with the coronation regalia, and crowned with St Edward's Crown. After this he was enthroned and received homage from Justin Welby, Archbishop of Canterbury, and William, Prince of Wales, and the people were invited to swear allegiance. The Queen then was anointed, crowned, and enthroned. The King and Queen ended the service by taking Holy Communion, and processed out of the abbey.

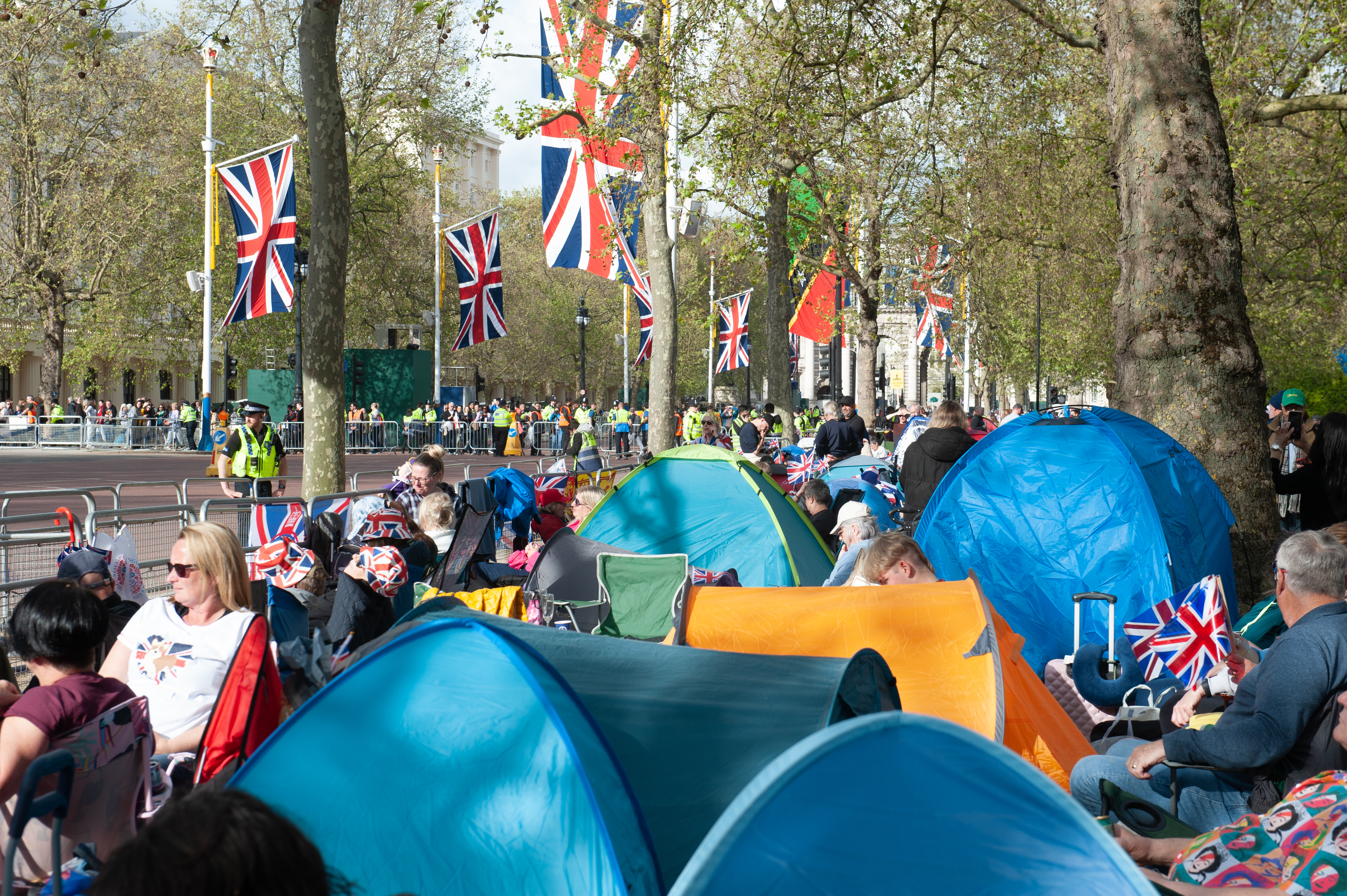
Spectators camping in a public viewing area along the procession route a day before the event

Several public viewing spots of the procession were prepared. Tens of thousands of people from the UK and the rest of the world were estimated to have lined the procession route. Despite the forecast for rain, spectators started camping along the procession route days before the event. On the morning of the event, authorities announced the procession route had reached capacity at 8:29.

=== Procession to the abbey ===
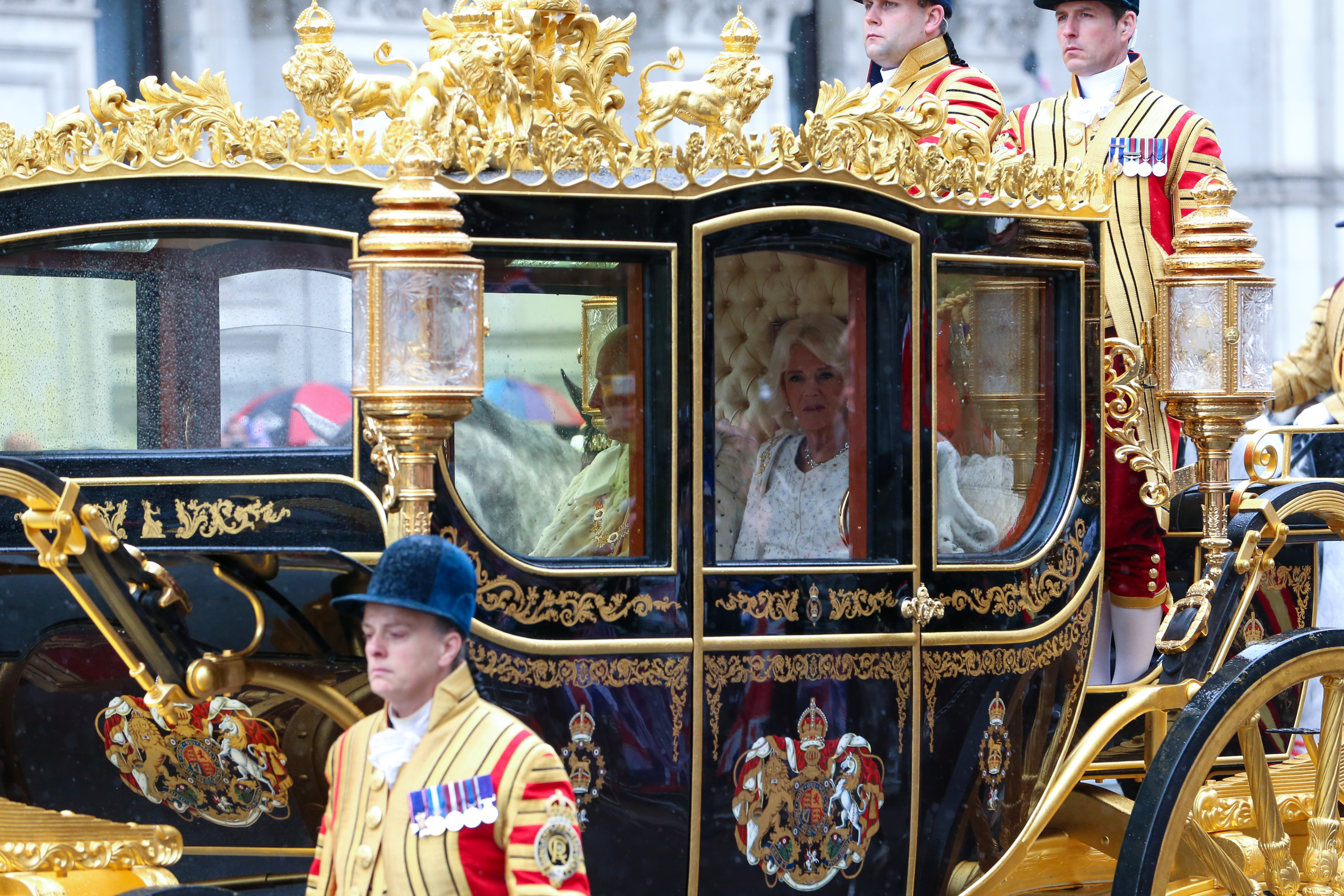
The Diamond Jubilee State Coach carrying the King and Queen to Westminster Abbey

On the day of the coronation the King and Queen travelled to Westminster Abbey in procession. They departed Buckingham Palace at 10:20 BST and went along The Mall, down Whitehall and along Parliament Street, and around the east and south sides of Parliament Square before reaching the Great West Door of Westminster Abbey, a distance of 1.42 miles (2.29 km). The King and Queen used the Diamond Jubilee State Coach, drawn by six Windsor Greys, and were accompanied by the Sovereign's Escort of the Household Cavalry Mounted Regiment. A new carriage, in production since 2018, was intended to carry the monarch, but as it could not be completed in time the Diamond Jubilee Coach was used instead.

=== Procession into the abbey ===
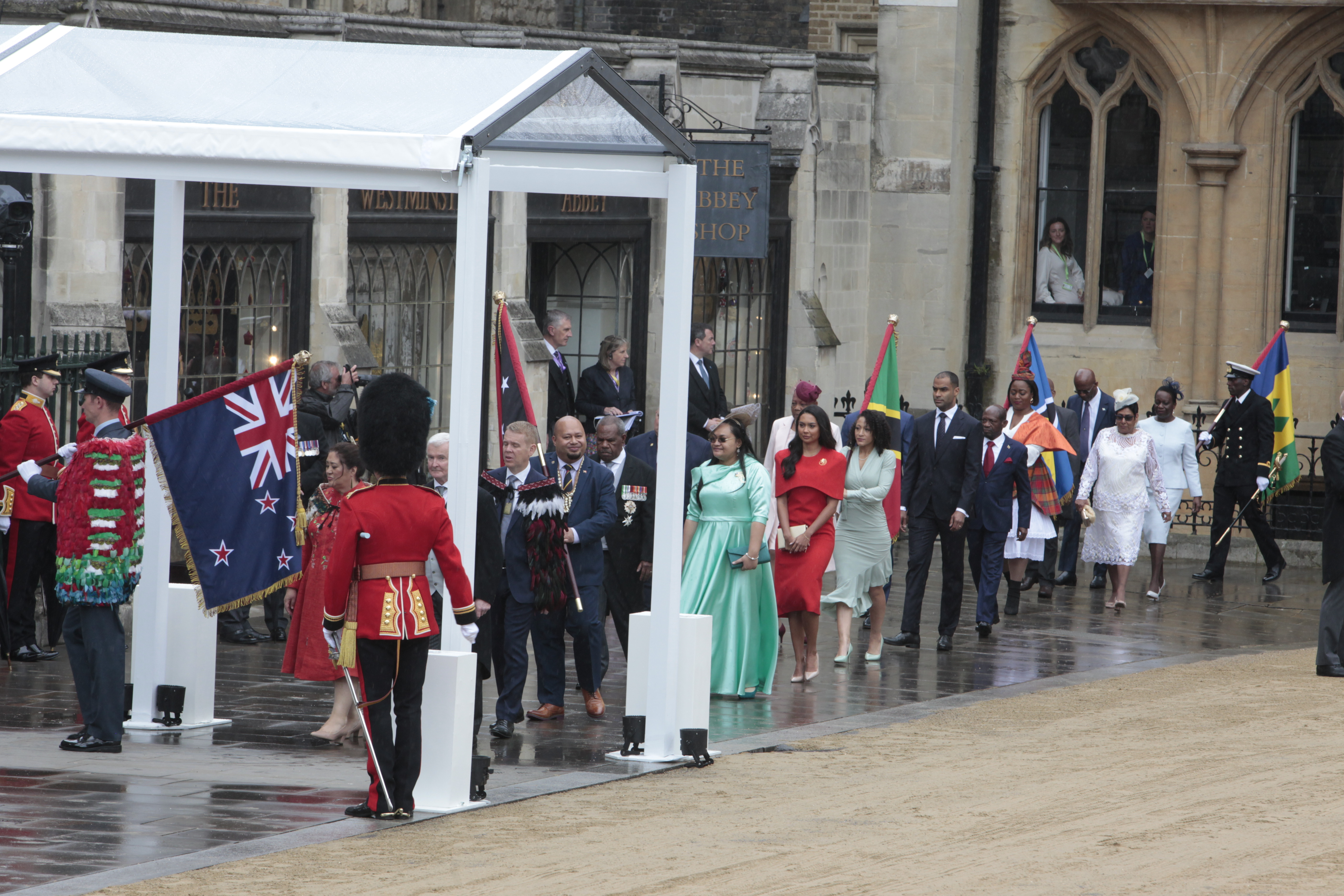
Flag bearers and leaders from the Commonwealth realms prior to their procession into the abbey

The procession into the abbey was led by leaders and representatives from non-Christian religions, including the Baháʼí, Buddhist, Hindu, Jain, Jewish, Shia and Sunni Muslim, Sikh, and Zoroastrian communities. They were followed by leaders from different Christian denominations, including the Church of England. After this the flags of the Commonwealth realms were carried by representatives, accompanied by their governors general and prime ministers. The choir followed.

The King and Queen arrived shortly before 11:00 and formed their own procession. It was led by four peers (Note: The Marquess of Anglesey, the Duke of Westminster, the Earl of Caledon and the Earl of Dundee) carrying heraldic standards displaying the arms of England, Northern Ireland, Scotland, and Wales, followed by the King's Champion, Francis Dymoke, carrying the Royal Standard. The Lord High Constable of England and the Earl Marshal also took part. The King and Queen were each attended by four pages of honour, including Prince George of Wales and Camilla's grandsons. (Note: For Charles: Prince George of Wales, Lord Oliver Cholmondeley (son of the Marquess and Marchioness of Cholmondeley), Nicholas Barclay (grandson of Sarah Troughton), and Ralph Tollemache (son of the Hon. Edward Tollemache). For Camilla, her grandsons Gus and Louis Lopes (sons of Laura Lopes) and Frederick Parker Bowles (son of Tom Parker Bowles), and her great-nephew, Arthur Elliot (son of Ben Elliot).) The Queen was also accompanied by two ladies in attendance: Annabel Elliot, her sister, and the Marchioness of Lansdowne. Unexpectedly the Prince and Princess of Wales and their two younger children arrived at the Abbey after the King, "whose horses went a lot faster than they had in the practice", and joined the procession after the King and Queen. The choir sang Hubert Parry's "I was glad", during which the King's Scholars of Westminster School sang "Vivat Regina Camilla" and "Vivat Rex Carolus" ('Long live Queen Camilla' and 'Long live King Charles').

After this the coronation regalia was carried in procession to the altar. At the King's request, the sixth-century St Augustine Gospels was also carried in the procession.

Bearers and presenters of regalia
Regalia	Bearer	Presenter	Ref.
King's Regalia
St Edward's Staff	The Baroness Manningham-Buller	—N/a	
Sword of Temporal Justice	The Lord Houghton of Richmond	—N/a	
Sword of Spiritual Justice	The Lord Richards of Herstmonceux	—N/a	
Sword of Mercy	The Lord Peach	—N/a	
Sword of State	The Rt Hon. Penny Mordaunt, Lord President of the Council	—N/a	
Sword of Offering	Petty Officer Amy Taylor (arrival); Penny Mordaunt (departure)	Justin Welby, Archbishop of Canterbury	
Golden Spurs	The Lord Hastings and The Earl of Loudoun	The Lord Carrington, Lord Great Chamberlain	
Armills	—N/a	The Lord Kamall	
Stole Royal	—N/a	Paul Butler, Bishop of Durham	
Robe Royal	—N/a	The Prince of Wales and The Baroness Merron	
Sovereign's Orb	Dame Elizabeth Anionwu	John McDowell, Archbishop of Armagh	
Sovereign's Ring	Brigadier Andrew Jackson, Keeper of the Jewel House	The Lord Patel	
Coronation Glove	—N/a	The Lord Singh of Wimbledon	
Sceptre with the Cross	The Duke of Buccleuch and Queensberry	Mark Strange, Bishop of Moray, Ross, and Caithness	
Sceptre with the Dove	The Baroness Benjamin	Andrew John, Bishop of Bangor	
St Edward's Crown	General Sir Gordon Messenger, Lord High Steward of England	Justin Welby, Archbishop of Canterbury	
Queen's Regalia
Queen Consort's Ring	The Lord Chartres	Brigadier Andrew Jackson	
Queen Mary's Crown	The Duke of Wellington	Justin Welby, Archbishop of Canterbury	
Queen Consort's Sceptre with the Cross	General Sir Patrick Sanders	The Lord Chartres	
Queen Consort's Rod with the Dove	The Baroness Kennedy of The Shaws	Rose Hudson-Wilkin, Bishop of Dover	

=== Recognition ===
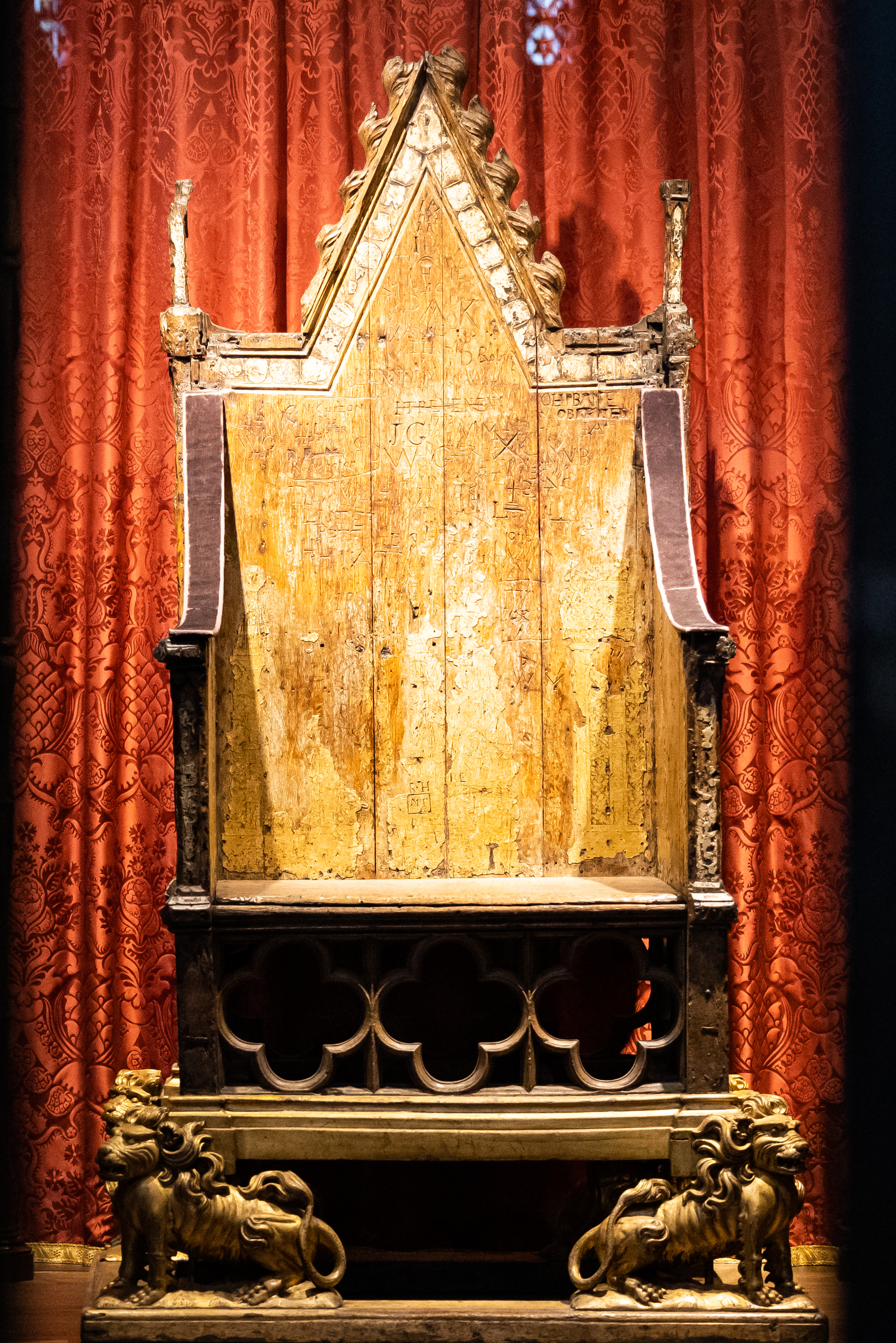
The Coronation Chair, which housed the Stone of Scone, was used by Charles during the ceremony. For this coronation, the chair was fitted with a new seat cushion and armrests.

The service, conducted by the Archbishop of Canterbury, began with the King and Queen having a silent moment of prayer before seating themselves on their chairs of estate, made for the 1953 coronation. In a new element of the service, the King was welcomed by one of the Children of the Chapel, to which he replied that he came "not to be served but to serve". Paul Mealor's "Coronation Kyrie" was sung in Welsh by Sir Bryn Terfel. After this the Archbishop of Canterbury, Lady Elish Angiolini, Christopher Finney, and Baroness Amos stood facing east, south, west, and north and in turn asked the congregation to recognise Charles as king; the crowd replied "God save King Charles!" each time. Charles was then presented with a new Bible by the Moderator of the General Assembly of the Church of Scotland.

=== Oath and accession declaration ===
The Archbishop of Canterbury acknowledged the existence of multiple faiths and beliefs in the United Kingdom. The King then took the coronation oath, in which he swore to govern each of his countries according to their respective laws and customs, to administer law and justice with mercy, and to uphold Protestantism in the United Kingdom and protect the Church of England. Subsequently, he made the statutory accession declaration. Charles then signed a written form of the oath, before kneeling before the altar and saying a prayer.

The service of Holy Communion continued and the Archbishop of Canterbury delivered the collect. The epistle was read by the Prime Minister of the United Kingdom, Rishi Sunak, and the Gospel by the bishop of London, Sarah Mullally. Then "The Ascension Choir" sang Alleluia (O Sing Praises) This was followed by a sermon by the Archbishop of Canterbury.

=== Anointing ===
The King removed his robe of state and was seated on the Coronation Chair. He then was anointed with holy oil by the Archbishop of Canterbury, using the ampulla and a medieval spoon, the latter the oldest part of the coronation regalia. The anointing emphasised the spiritual role of the sovereign. It was a private part of the service; as in 1953 it was not televised, and the King was concealed by a screen. During this the choir sang the anthem Zadok the Priest.

=== Investment ===
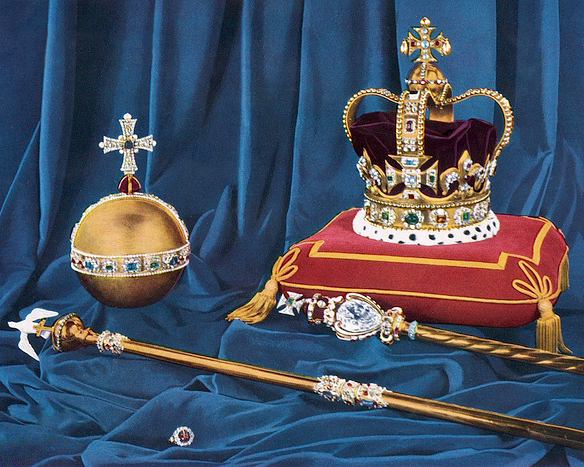
St Edward's Crown, the Orb, the Sovereign's Sceptre with Cross, the Sovereign's Sceptre with Dove, and the Sovereign's Ring

In the next part of the service, the King was presented with several items from the coronation regalia.

The spurs, armills, Sword of State, and Sword of Offering were given to the King, who touched them with his hand, before they were removed again. During this, Psalm 71 was chanted in Greek by an Orthodox choir in tribute to the King's father, Prince Philip, who was born a prince of Greece. The King was invested with the stole royal, robe royal, and the Sovereign's Orb, and presented with the sovereign's ring, which he touched but did not wear. He was then invested with the Coronation glove, the Sovereign's Sceptre with Cross, and the Sovereign's Sceptre with Dove.

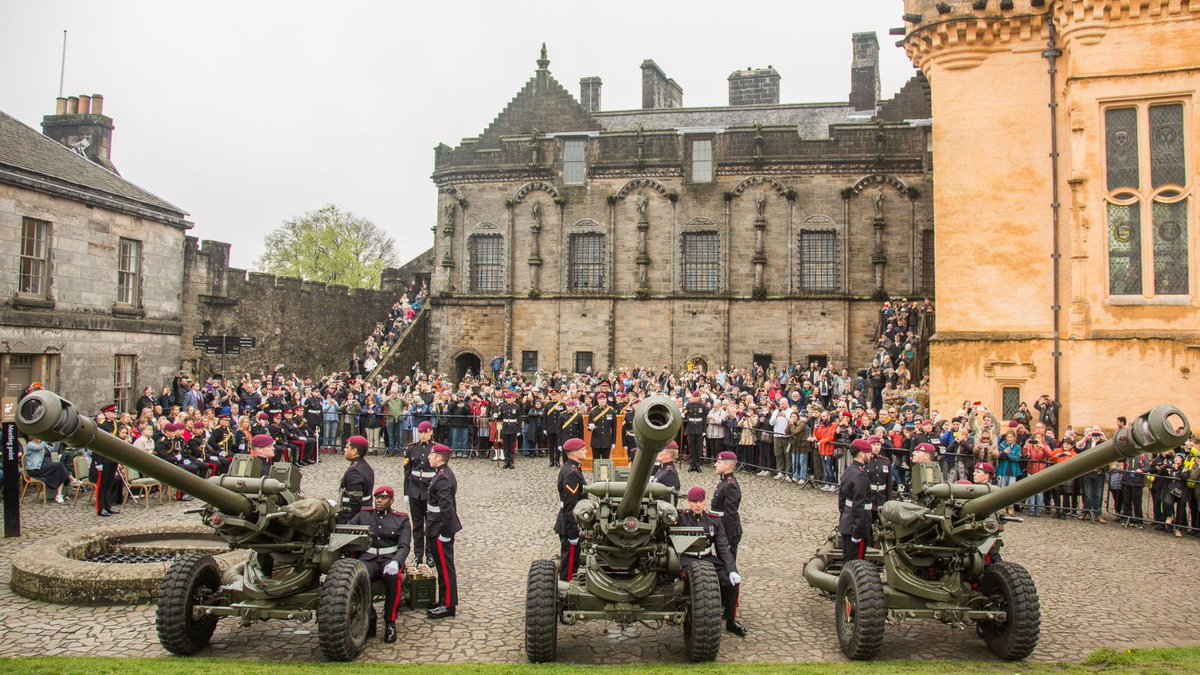
Gun salute by 5th Regiment Royal Artillery at Stirling Castle, at the moment Charles is crowned

=== Crowning ===
The King then was crowned with the St Edward's Crown by the Archbishop of Canterbury, with the Archbishop and then the congregation chanting, "God save the King!".

At the moment of crowning the church bells of the abbey rang, 21-gun salutes were fired at 13 locations around the United Kingdom and on deployed Royal Navy ships, and 62-gun salutes and a six-gun salvo were fired from the Tower of London and Horse Guards Parade.

The King then received a blessing read by the following: Stephen Cottrell, Archbishop of York; Nikitas Loulias, the Greek Orthodox Archbishop of Thyateira and Great Britain; the Moderator of the Free Churches; the Secretary General of Churches Together in England; His Eminence Vincent Cardinal Nichols, Archbishop of Westminster, all representing the Anglican, Greek Orthodox, Nonconformist, ecumenical, and Roman Catholic traditions respectively, as well as the Archbishop of Canterbury.

=== Enthronement and homage ===
The King moved to the throne (originally made for George VI in 1937) and the Archbishop of Canterbury and William, Prince of Wales, offered him their fealty. The Archbishop of Canterbury then invited the people of the United Kingdom and the other Commonwealth realms to swear allegiance to the King, the first time this has occurred.

=== Coronation of the Queen ===
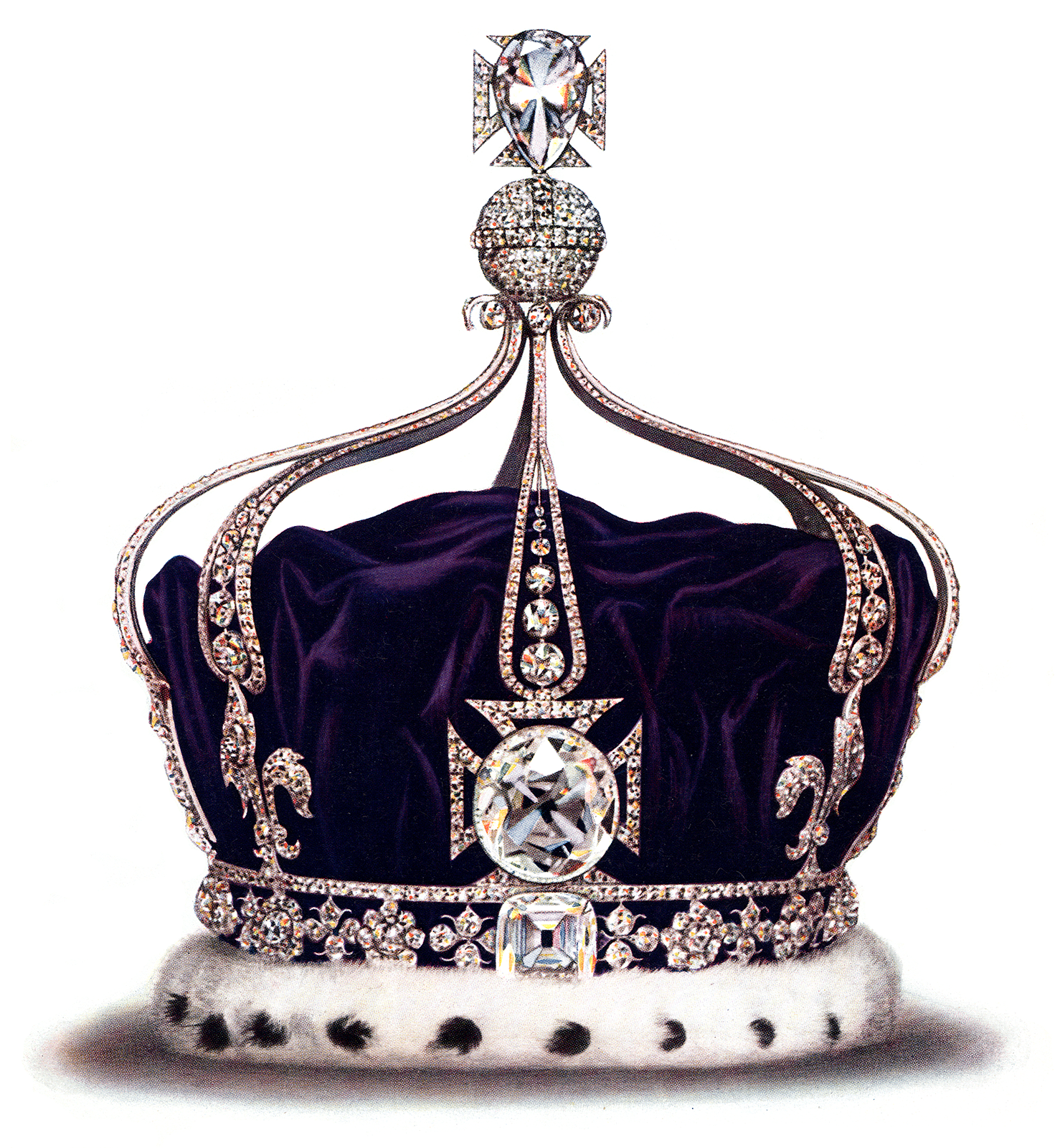
Queen Mary's Crown (here depicted in its original form) was used to crown Queen Camilla

Queen Camilla was anointed in public view, thought to be the first time this has occurred, and then presented with the Queen Consort's Ring.

=== Crowning ===
The Queen then was crowned by the Archbishop of Canterbury using Queen Mary's Crown. Queen Camilla then was presented with the Queen Consort's Sceptre with Cross and the Queen Consort's Rod with Dove (which, unlike other queens consort, she chose not to carry), before sitting on her own throne (originally made for Queen Elizabeth the Queen Mother in 1937) beside the King.

This was the first coronation of a consort since that of the King’s grandmother, Coronation of George VI and Elizabeth.

=== Holy Communion ===
The offertory followed, during which gifts of bread and wine were brought before the King and prayed over; the prayer was a translation from the Liber Regalis, which dates from c. 1382 and is one of the oldest sources for the English coronation service. The King and Queen then received Holy Communion from the Archbishop of Canterbury and the congregation recited the Lord's Prayer, before a final blessing.

=== End of the service ===
At the end of the service the King changed into the Imperial State Crown, during which the congregation sang Praise, my soul, the King of heaven.

The King and Queen then proceeded to the west door of the abbey as the national anthem, "God Save the King", was sung. At the end of the procession the King received a greeting by governors-general of the realms and representatives from the Jewish, Hindu, Sikh, Muslim, and Buddhist faiths. The abbey bells rang a full peal of "Cambridge Surprise Royal".

=== State procession to Buckingham Palace ===
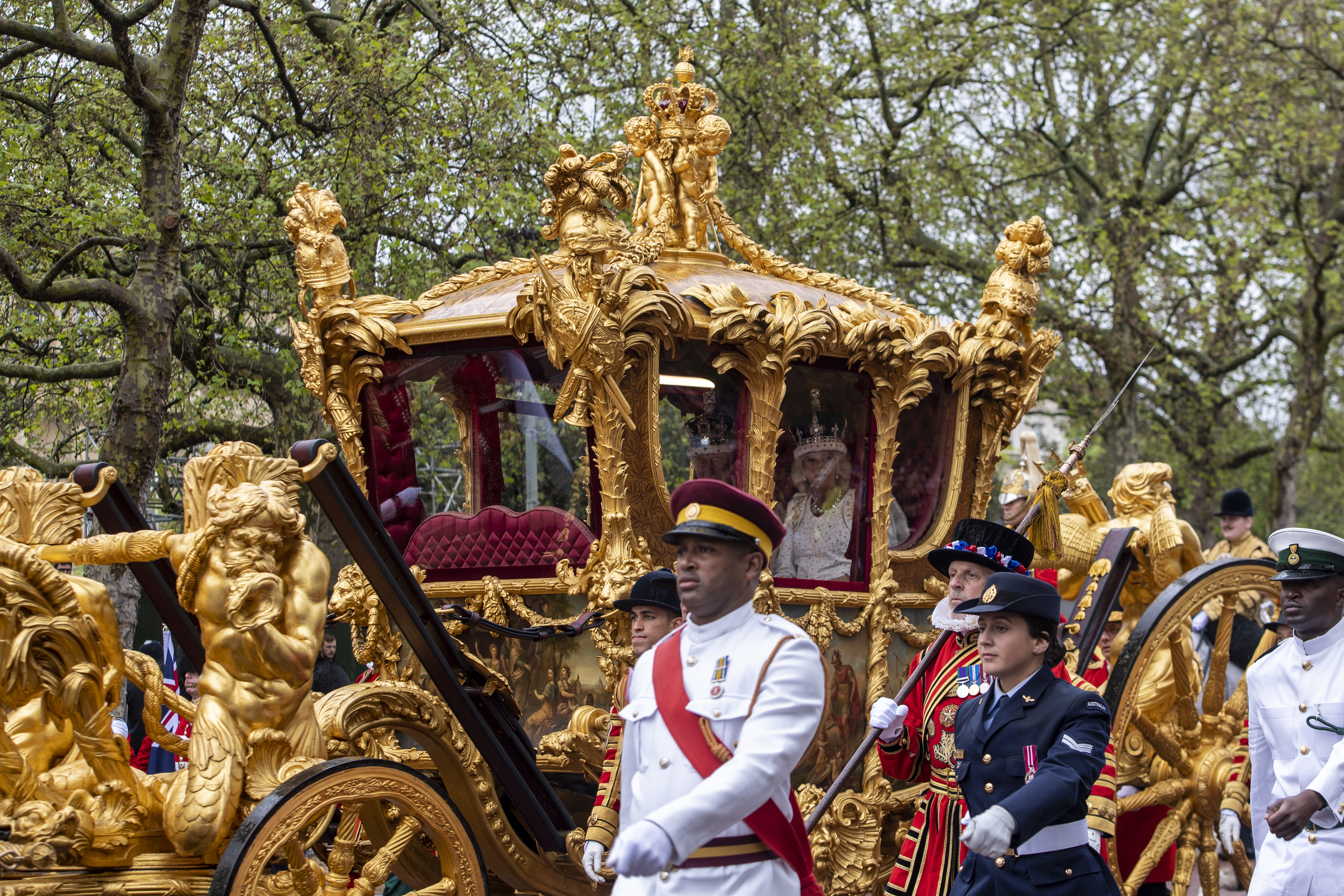
The King and Queen returning to Buckingham Palace in the Gold State Coach

The second procession followed the same route as the first, but in reverse and on a larger scale. The King and Queen were carried in the Gold State Coach, drawn by eight Windsor Grey horses, with other members of the royal family in other vehicles, including the Australian State Coach, (Note: The Prince and Princess of Wales, Prince George, Prince Louis, and Princess Charlotte of Wales travelled in this carriage.) the Irish State Coach (Note: The Duke and Duchess of Edinburgh, Lady Louise Mountbatten-Windsor, and Earl of Wessex travelled in this carriage.) and the Scottish State Coach. (Note: The Duke and Duchess of Gloucester and Sir Timothy Laurence travelled in this carriage.)

The armed forces of the United Kingdom, other countries of the Commonwealth, and the British Overseas Territories played a significant part. Over 5,000 members of the British Armed Forces and 400 Armed Forces personnel from at least 35 other Commonwealth countries were part of the two processions, and 1,000 lined the route. The Sovereign's Bodyguard, the Royal Canadian Mounted Police, and Royal Watermen also took part in the procession, and the Royal British Legion formed a Guard of Honour of 100 Standard Bearers in Parliament Square. The Princess Royal and the Commander of the Household Cavalry served as the Gold Stick-in-Waiting and Silver Stick-in-Waiting, respectively.

=== Balcony appearances ===
At Buckingham Palace, the King and Queen stood on the rear balcony and received a royal salute and three cheers from the armed forces, who were massed in the palace garden.

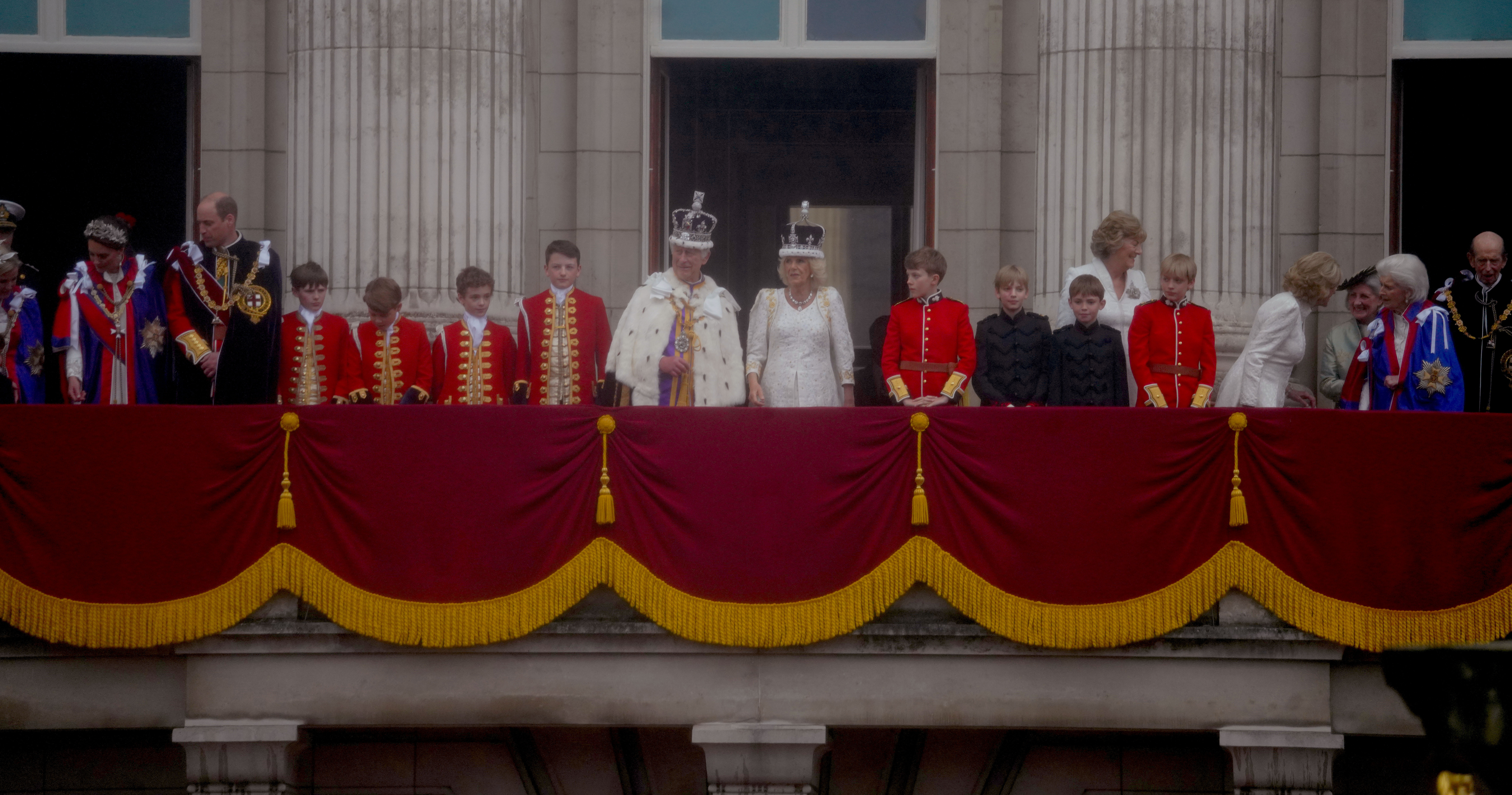
The King and Queen and other members of the royal family on the balcony of Buckingham Palace

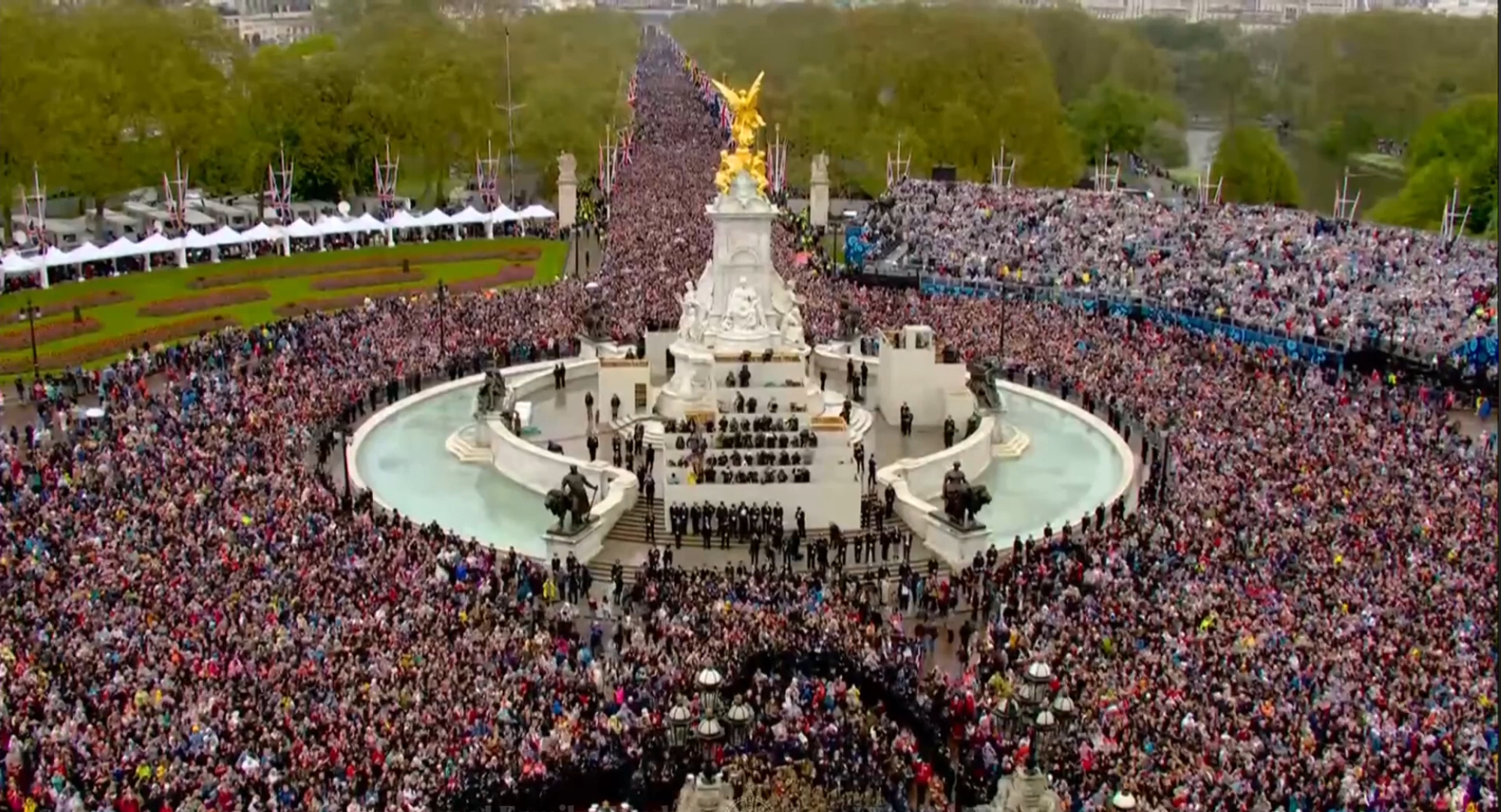
A large crowd gathered outside Buckingham Palace

They later joined other members of the royal family on the front balcony to review a flypast by helicopters and the Red Arrows aerobatic team. (Note: Members of the royal family that made an appearance on the front balcony include the King and Queen, the Prince and Princess of Wales and their children, the Princess Royal and Sir Timothy Laurence, the Duke and Duchess of Edinburgh and their children, the Duke and Duchess of Gloucester, the Duke of Kent, and Princess Alexandra, The Honourable Lady Ogilvy.) A six-minute flypast of 68 aircraft was planned, but prevented by rain and low clouds. (Note: Other aircraft, which were removed from the flypast on safety grounds, included Spitfires, a Lancaster and Hurricanes; F-35B Lightning jets; the P-8A Poseidon maritime patrol aircraft; transport aircraft from the RAF Air Mobility Force; 18 Eurofighter Typhoons; and the RAF's new Envoy IV CC1 The aircraft took part at the Trooping the Colour ceremony the following month instead.) A grandstand was built in front of Buckingham Palace from which to watch the procession and flypast, with 3,800 seats offered to Armed Forces veterans, NHS and social care workers, and representatives of charities with links to the King and Queen. In addition, 354 uniformed cadet forces viewed the procession at Admiralty Arch.

== Public events and commemorations ==
Several Commonwealth countries held events and issued commemorative items to mark the coronation. Events, including themed parties and public viewings, were also privately organised in countries like the United States.

=== United Kingdom ===
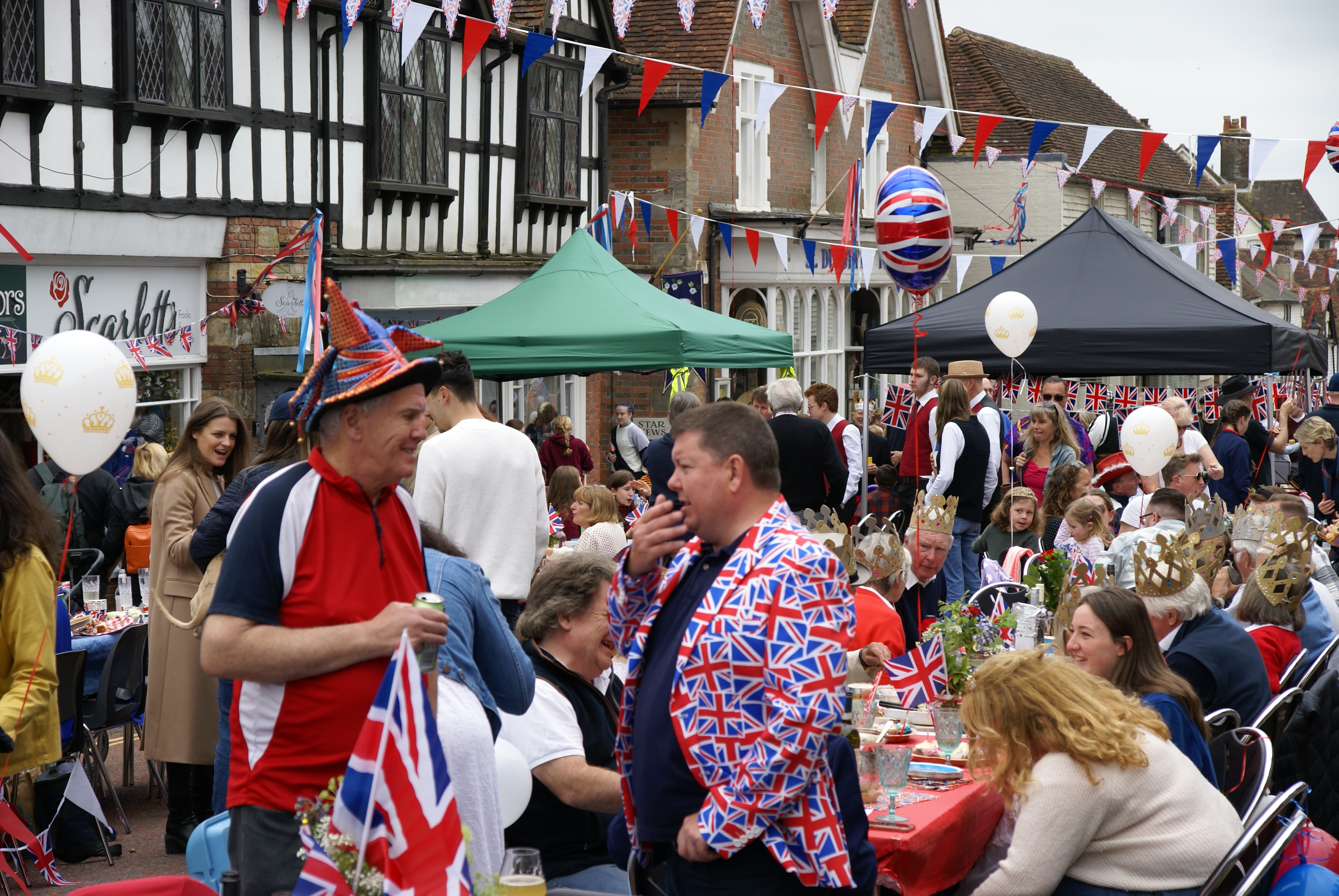
A Coronation Big Lunch held in Mayfield, Kent

In April 2023, Buckingham Palace revealed a new hashflag emoji depicting St Edward's Crown for use on Twitter. The King and Queen attended a celebratory pre-coronation reception at Westminster Hall on 2 May. They hosted coronation garden parties at the Buckingham Palace on 3 and 9 May, at Hillsborough Castle on 24 May and at the Palace of Holyroodhouse on 4 July. On 5 May, the King, together with the Prince and Princess of Wales, greeted crowds at The Mall during a walkabout.

On 6 May, players lined up as the national anthem was played before football and cricket matches throughout the country. There were special ceremonies held at the Newmarket horse race meeting, Rugby Union Premiership as well as at the Badminton Horse Trials.

"Coronation Big Lunches" and street parties were planned on 6–8 May people throughout the UK. More than 67,000 Coronation Big Lunch events took place, with local councils having approved the closure of 3,087 roads. Most street parties were scheduled for Sunday, 7 May. Eden Project Communities, which organised the nationwide community events, said that 13.4 million people across the country took part in a Coronation Big Lunch and raised £14.4 million for good causes. Queen Camilla had been Patron of The Big Lunch since 2013.

Coronation quiche was chosen by the King and Queen as the official dish of the Coronation Big Lunch. Coronation Trifle was the official pudding, it was created by Adam Handling and is made with Parkin, ginger custard and strawberry jelly. Pubs also remained open until 01:00 on the coronation weekend.

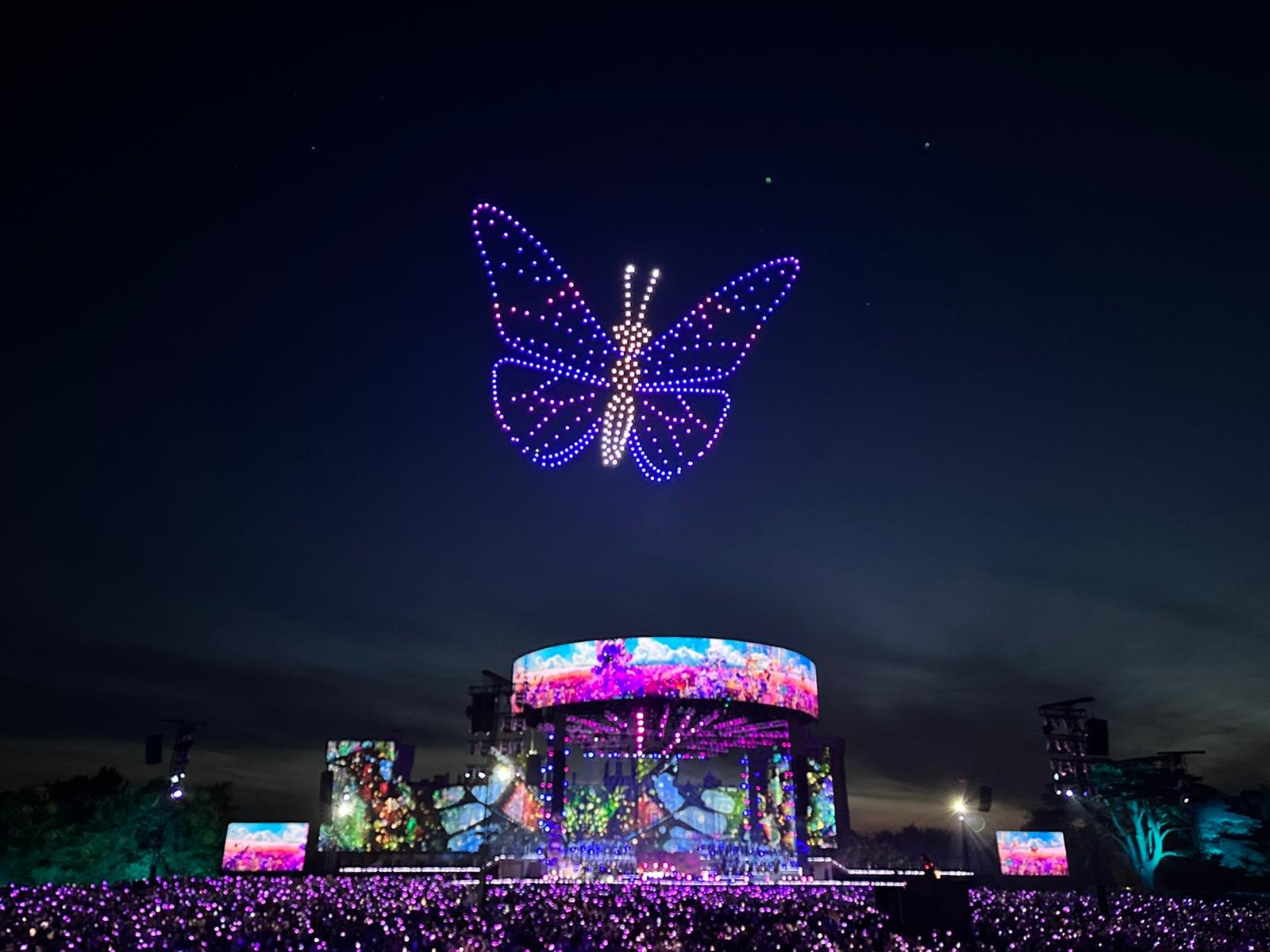
The Coronation Concert, with drones in formation overhead

Across the UK, local authorities spent over £3.8 million on events to mark the coronation.

The Coronation Concert was planned for 7 May to be held on the east lawn of Windsor Castle. In addition to performances by singers, musicians, and stage and screen actors, the show also featured a "Coronation Choir" composed of community choirs and amateur singers. During the concert, landmarks, areas of natural beauty, and street parties were featured. 5,000 pairs of free tickets were distributed by public ballot, and volunteers from the King and Queen's charities were also invited. Several musical performers reportedly turned down the palace's invitation to perform citing scheduling conflicts.

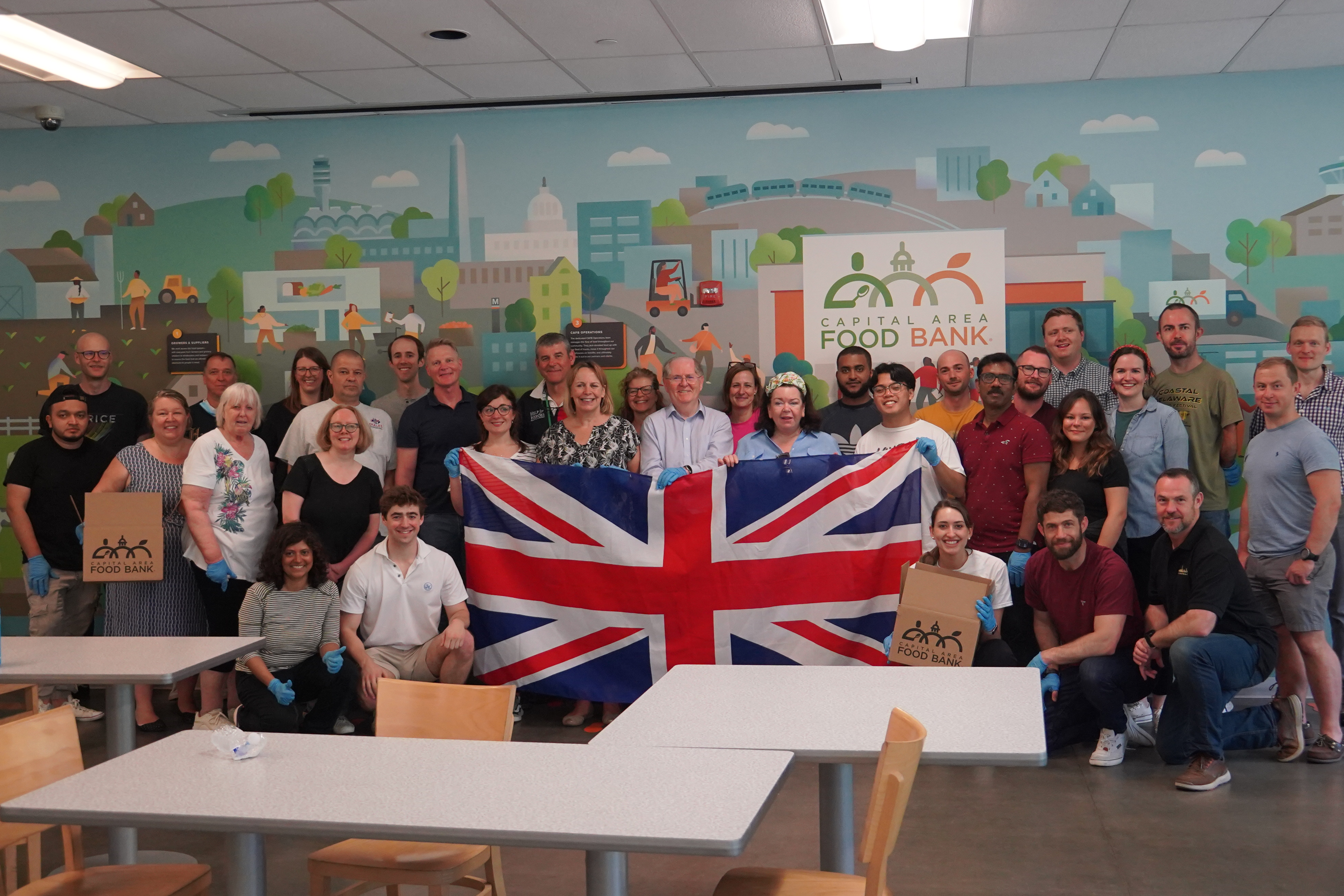
Staff from the British Embassy in Washington D.C. volunteer at the Capital Area Food Bank on 8 May as a part of the Big Help Out initiative

A public holiday was declared on 8 May to commemorate the coronation. On the same day, the Together Coalition, in partnership with The Scout Association, the Royal Voluntary Service, and various faith groups, organised the Big Help Out initiative to encourage volunteering and community service. An estimated 6 million took part in the initiative. The Royal Voluntary Service, of which Camilla is president, also launched the Coronation Champions Awards, which recognised 500 volunteers nominated by the public. The National Literacy Trust, of which Camilla is patron, announced the opening of 50 special primary school libraries to mark the coronation.

The Coronation Theatre was on display at Westminster Abbey from 8 to 13 May.The Tower of London explored the history of the Crown Jewels in a new exhibition to mark Coronation year, which opened to the public on 26 May. Between 14 July and 24 September 2023, outfits worn by the King and Queen at the Coronation were on display in the Ballroom as part of the summer opening of Buckingham Palace. Six pairs of Coronation Chairs were auctioned by Christie's and the sale raised funds for four charities chosen by the King and Queen.

The King and Queen, along with the Duke and Duchess of Rothesay, marked the coronation in Scotland by attending a national service of thanksgiving on 5 July. The Honours of Scotland were collected from Edinburgh Castle and taken to St Giles' Cathedral following a "People's Procession" involving 100 people that represented aspects of Scottish life. The King and Queen and the Duke and Duchess of Rothesay travelled from the Palace of Holyroodhouse to the cathedral in the "Royal Procession" along the Royal Mile. Following a service of thanksgiving at the cathedral where the King was presented with the Honours, a 21-gun salute from Edinburgh Castle and a fly past by the Red Arrows took place.

On his 75th birthday in November 2023, the King launched the Coronation Food Project, an initiative aimed at tackling food poverty and insecurity by reducing food waste through redistribution.

==== Ecclesiastical initiatives ====
Twenty-eight days prior to the coronation, the Church of England established a period of prayer for them, and to this end, published a Book of Daily Prayers that included "daily themes, reflections and prayers for use by individuals, churches or groups".

Congregations of the Church of England held special commemorative services throughout the country on 6–7 May 2023.

==== Government initiatives ====
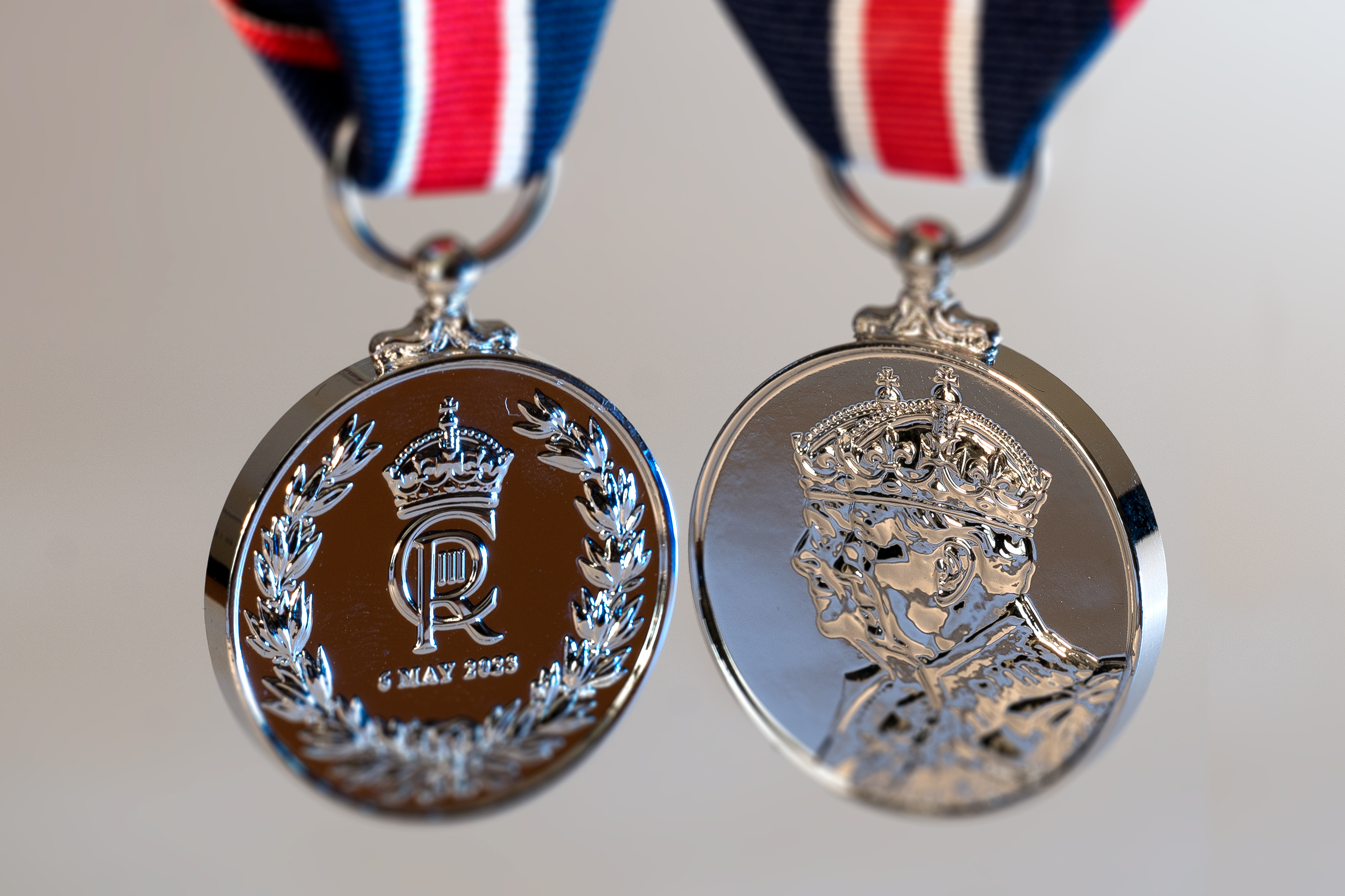
Coronation medals issued in the United Kingdom

The government of the United Kingdom issued coronation medals to 400,000 individuals, including those involved in supporting the coronation, front line emergency and prison services workers, and members of the British Armed Forces. The medals are made of nickel silver and plated in nickel and feature an effigy of the King and Queen, on a red, white and blue ribbon.

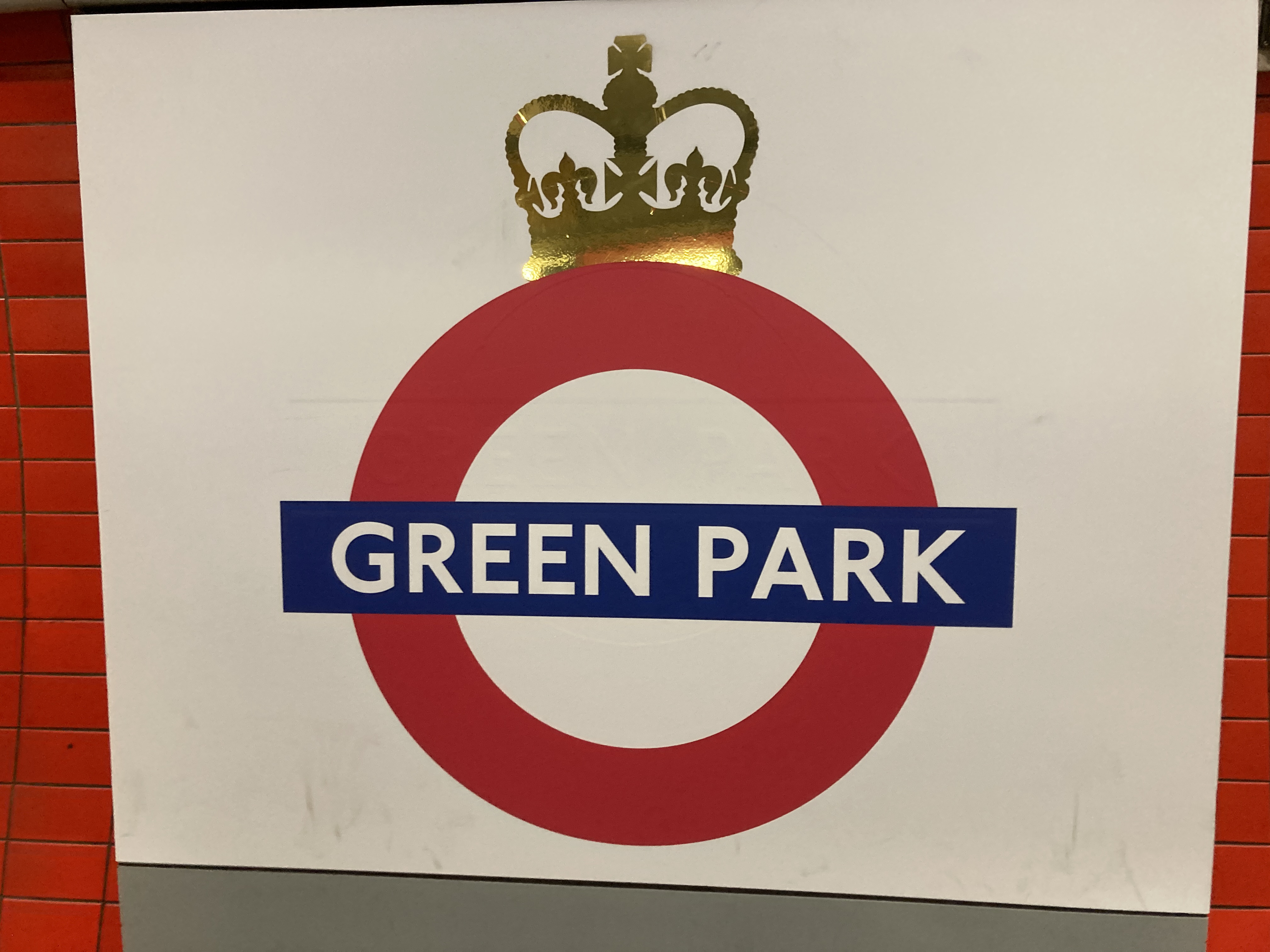
A crowned roundel for Green Park tube station

Transport for London announced several initiatives. The roundels used by the London Underground, Overground, and Elizabeth line were redesigned to include a crown for the coronation. Voice announcement were also replaced by announcements recorded by the King and Queen on 5 May, and were used on railway station and all Underground stations throughout the coronation weekend and bank holiday on Monday. London North Eastern Railway named its daily 11:00 passenger train from London King's Cross to Edinburgh Waverley the Carolean Express, starting on 6 May. Great Western Railway named its daily 8:48 passenger train from London Paddington to Swansea the Flying Carolean, as well as naming one of their Intercity Express Trains as Flying Carolean and Y Carolean Hedegog – with the Welsh paying homage to Charles' tenure as Prince of Wales.

Natural England will mark the coronation with the creation of the King's Series of National Nature Reserves, which will see five major national nature reserves named every year for the next five years. A new Coronation Garden in Newtownabbey which features music, moving plants, bubbles and a large metal bandstand named in honour of the King and Queen was opened on 24 May. In August, a government fund was launched to plant thousands of trees to mark the coronation and celebrate Charles' interest in the environment.

Government Art Collection commissioned leading British and British-based artists to create new artworks to mark the coronation, which was display at the National Archives from May 2025 to April 2026.

==== Memorabilia ====
The Royal Mint released a new collection of coins, including 50p and £5 coin depicting the King wearing the Tudor Crown.

Royal Mail issued four stamps to mark the King's coronation, as it did for the coronations of King George VI and Queen Elizabeth II. The company also unveiled four specially decorated postboxes and applied a special postmark from 28 April to 10 May to celebrate the coronation.

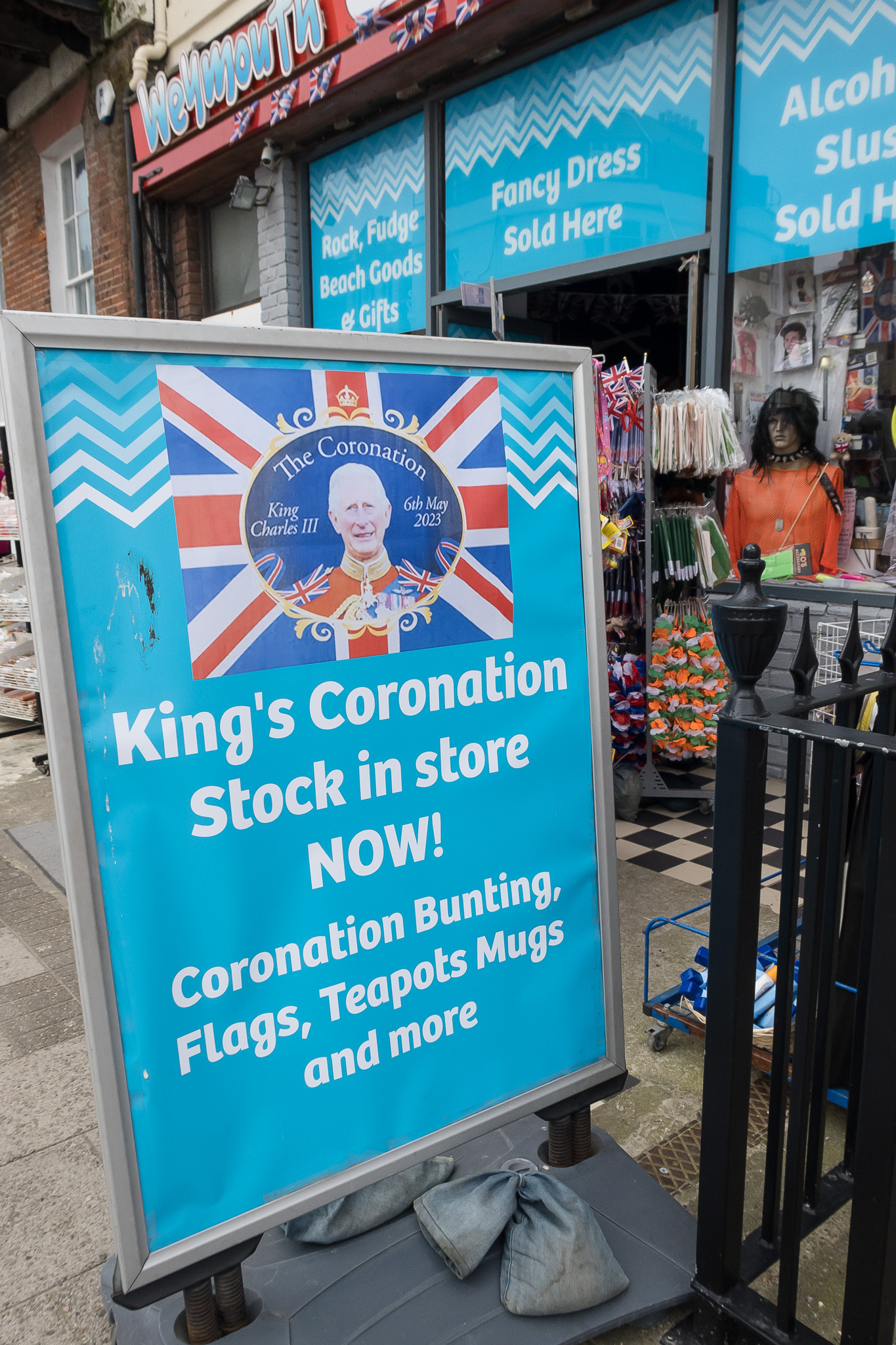
Signage for a store advertising the sale of coronation memorabilia in Weymouth

The Royal Collection Trust released official coronation memorabilia to mark the occasion. In February 2023, Buckingham Palace announced it would temporarily relax the "rules governing the commercial use of royal photographs and official insignia" to allow other groups to produce coronation memorabilia.

Companies that have produced coronation memorabilia include Emma Bridgewater, Jan Constantine, Merrythought, and Royal Crown Derby. Greene King produced a special brew to mark the coronation and auctioned several unopened crates of a special brew created for the cancelled coronation of Edward VIII in 1937, with proceeds from the auction going to The Prince's Trust. Ian Fleming Publications commissioned Young Bond series author Charlie Higson to write a new James Bond adventure, “On His Majesty’s Secret Service,” to celebrate the coronation.

==== Crown Dependencies ====
A public holiday was declared on 8 May in Guernsey, the Isle of Man, and Jersey. As in the United Kingdom, Big Help Outs were also organised in all three Crown Dependencies on the day of the holiday.

The states of Guernsey planned events to celebrate the coronation from 5 to 8 May. A vigil was held on 5 May at Forest Methodist Church to reflect on the coronation's spiritual element. On 6 May, bells rang from Town Church, Vale, Forest, and St Pierre du Bois. A live broadcast of the coronation service was played on a large screen at the King George V Sports Ground (KGV), followed by a military parade from Fort George to the Model Yacht Pond. A 21-gun salute was fired at noon from Castle Cornet as part of the national salute. On 7 May, a Coronation Big Lunch was held at Saint Peter Port seafront, along with a service of thanksgiving at the Town Church. That evening the Coronation Concert was planned to be screened live at the KGV playing fields, and buildings including Castle Cornet and Fort Grey were illuminated in red, white, and blue in the evening.

In Jersey, on 6 May, Coronation Park hosted a large-screen broadcast of the coronation, musical entertainment, and activities. Licensed establishments were encouraged to open ahead of the ceremony's broadcast, and seventh category licensed establishments could apply for special extensions to stay open until 3 am on 7 May. On 7 May, the Coronation Big Lunch took place in Liberation Square, where a public screening of the coronation concert was also held.

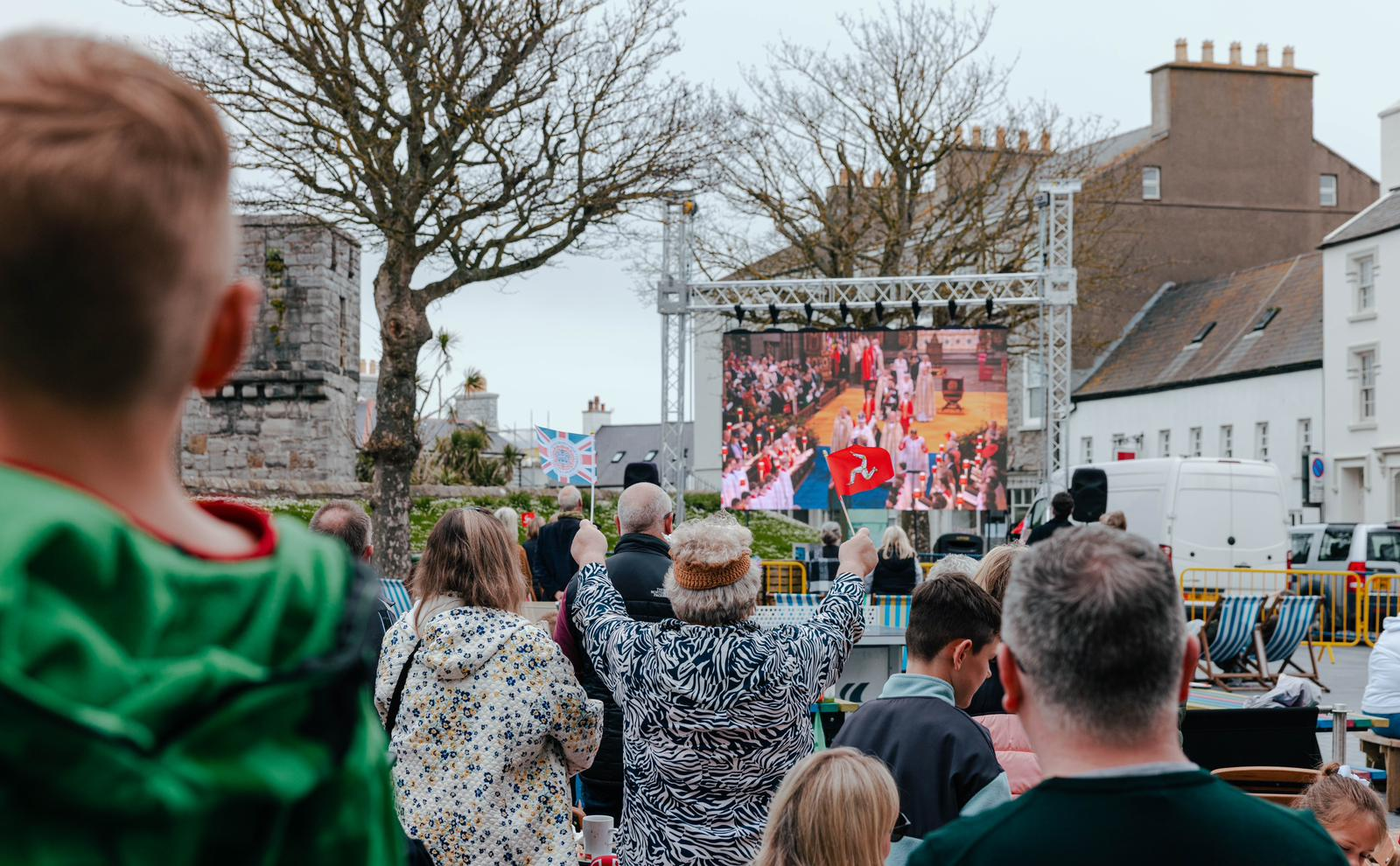
A crowd in the Isle of Man watches the coronation

The Isle of Man government organised three days of festivities from 6 to 8 May. A Coronation Event Fund was established to assist local authorities, community groups, and charities help finance celebrations. On 7 May, a Biosphere Bee Community Picnic took place, and the Legislative Buildings in Douglas was also lit up. A collection of 12 Isle of Man stamps featuring photos of the King and Queen, portraits of the King, and the royal cypher were also released in April 2023. In keeping with the Manx tradition of giving two peregrine falcons to the Lord of Mann upon their coronation, the Isle of Man gifted the King a wooden bowl adorned with two silver falcons made by local crafts people.

==== British Overseas Territories ====
A public holiday was declared in Bermuda, the Cayman Islands, and Gibraltar on 8 May.

Several events were planned in Bermuda. On 6 May, commemorative tree planting and the opening of a Coronation Garden, designed to reflect Prince Charles's work in support of the environment and sustainable farming, took place at Bermuda Botanical Gardens. On 7 May, a service of thanksgiving was held at the Cathedral of the Most Holy Trinity, and on 8 May the Children's Reading Festival took place to recognise the Queen’s commitment to literacy, particularly for young people.

Celebrations in the Falkland Islands included a children's fancy dress party, a live music and karaoke event for young adults, as well as the Big Lunch and the Big Help Out.

In Gibraltar, festivities took place on 3 May, including a parade of British Forces Gibraltar and essential services, garden and street parties, concerts, and a 21-gun salute performed by the Royal Gibraltar Regiment. A live screening of the event also took place at Grand Casemates Square.

=== Canada ===
==== Emblem and commemorative items ====
The Canadian coronation emblem

A Canadian coronation emblem was created by Cathy Bursey-Sabourin, Fraser Herald of Arms, and registered with the Canadian Heraldic Authority. It includes Charles III's royal cypher inside a ring of 13 triangular shapes, the number corresponding to Canada's provinces and territories. The circular arrangement symbolises inclusion and the Indigenous concept of equity and the natural world's cycles. The colour green is a reference to the King's commitment to the natural environment, while the white spaces may be viewed as a sunburst, symbolising innovation and new ideas.

A special edition of Canadian Geographic, which focused on the King, was distributed and the Royal Canadian Mint produced several commemorative coins.

The Canadian Heritage Mint, a private mint, produced and sold coronation medallions designed by Susan Taylor, a former senior engraver at the Royal Canadian Mint, and approved by the King. These came in two forms: One shows, on the obverse, the King, wearing the Imperial State Crown, next to his royal cypher and, on the reverse, the encircling words "King Charles III • coronation • 6th May 2023" with St Edward's Crown at the centre of a wreath of six maple leaves. Each leaf represents a coronation of a Canadian monarch since Confederation: Victoria, Edward VII, George V, George VI, Elizabeth II, and Charles III. (Note: Edward VIII did not have a coronation before his abdication.) The second medallion features ultra-high relief effigies of the King and Queen, along with the coronation date, while maintaining a consistent arrangement of maple leaves encircling St Edward's Crown on the reverse. Of the single-effigy, 3,500 were produced from one ounce of silver and 5,000 were rendered in bronze. Six hundred of the dual-effigy medallions were struck in five ounces of silver and 1,800 were made from eight ounces of bronze with an antique finish.

==== Federal initiatives ====
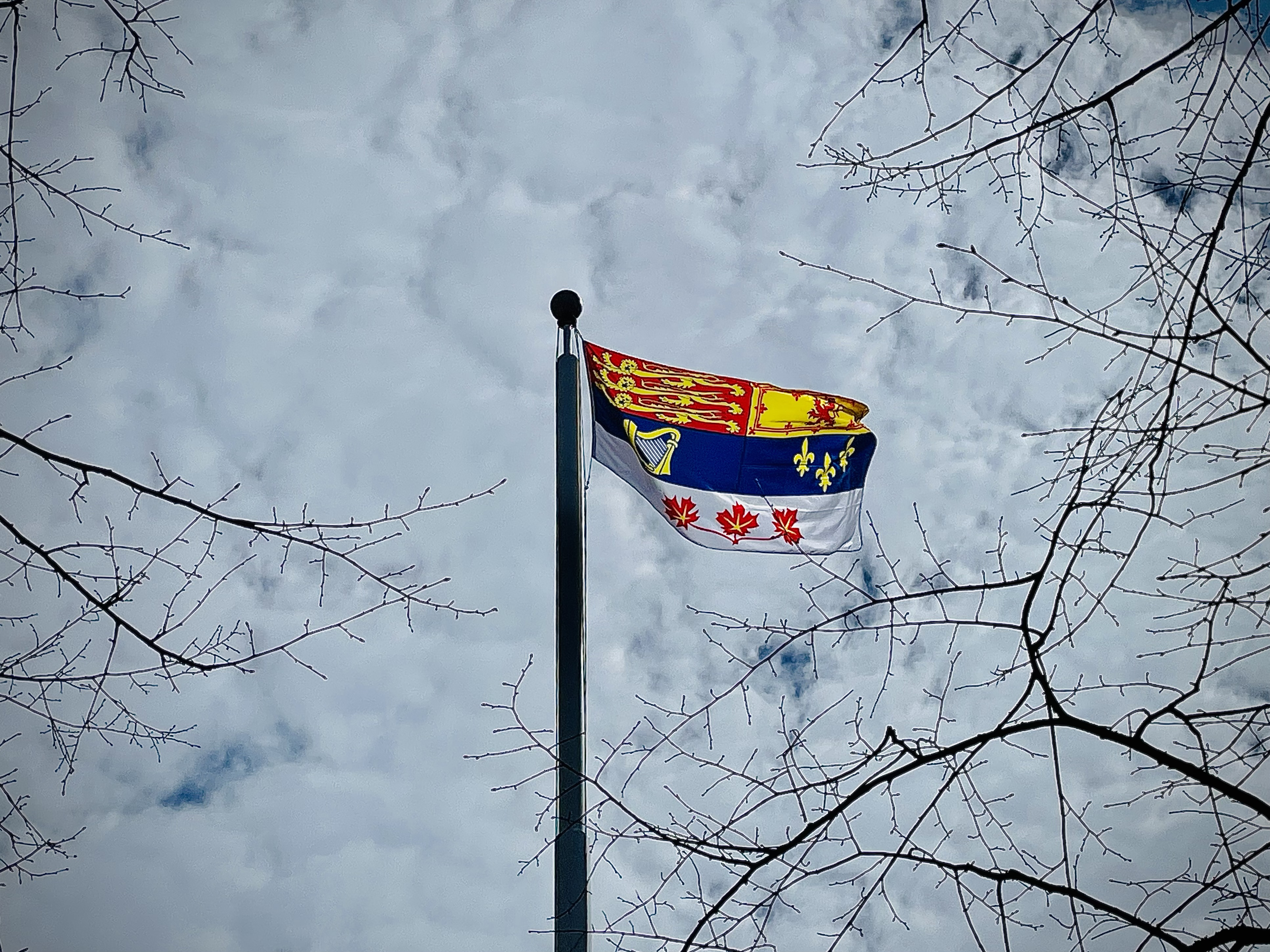
The new royal standard of Canada, flown outside Government House, Halifax, after its unveiling on 6 May

On 6 May, a televised national ceremony to mark the coronation of the King of Canada took place at the Sir John A. Macdonald Building in Ottawa. It featured speeches by Algonquin spiritual leader Albert Dumont and aerospace engineer Farah Alibay, and performances by the Eagle River Singers, Sabrina Benaim, Florence K, Inn Echo, and the Ottawa Regional Youth Choir. During the event, Dominic Laporte created a spray-paint artpiece thematically linked to flowers, as an homage to the King’s support for the natural environment. Several items were unveiled at the ceremony, including a new standard for the monarch, a heraldic crown incorporating distinctly Canadian elements, and a definitive stamp with an image of the King by Canada Post. It was also announced that an effigy of Charles III would replace that of Elizabeth II on Canadian coinage and the Canadian twenty-dollar note. The ceremony concluded with a 21-gun salute and a performance by the Central Band of the Canadian Armed Forces on Parliament Hill.

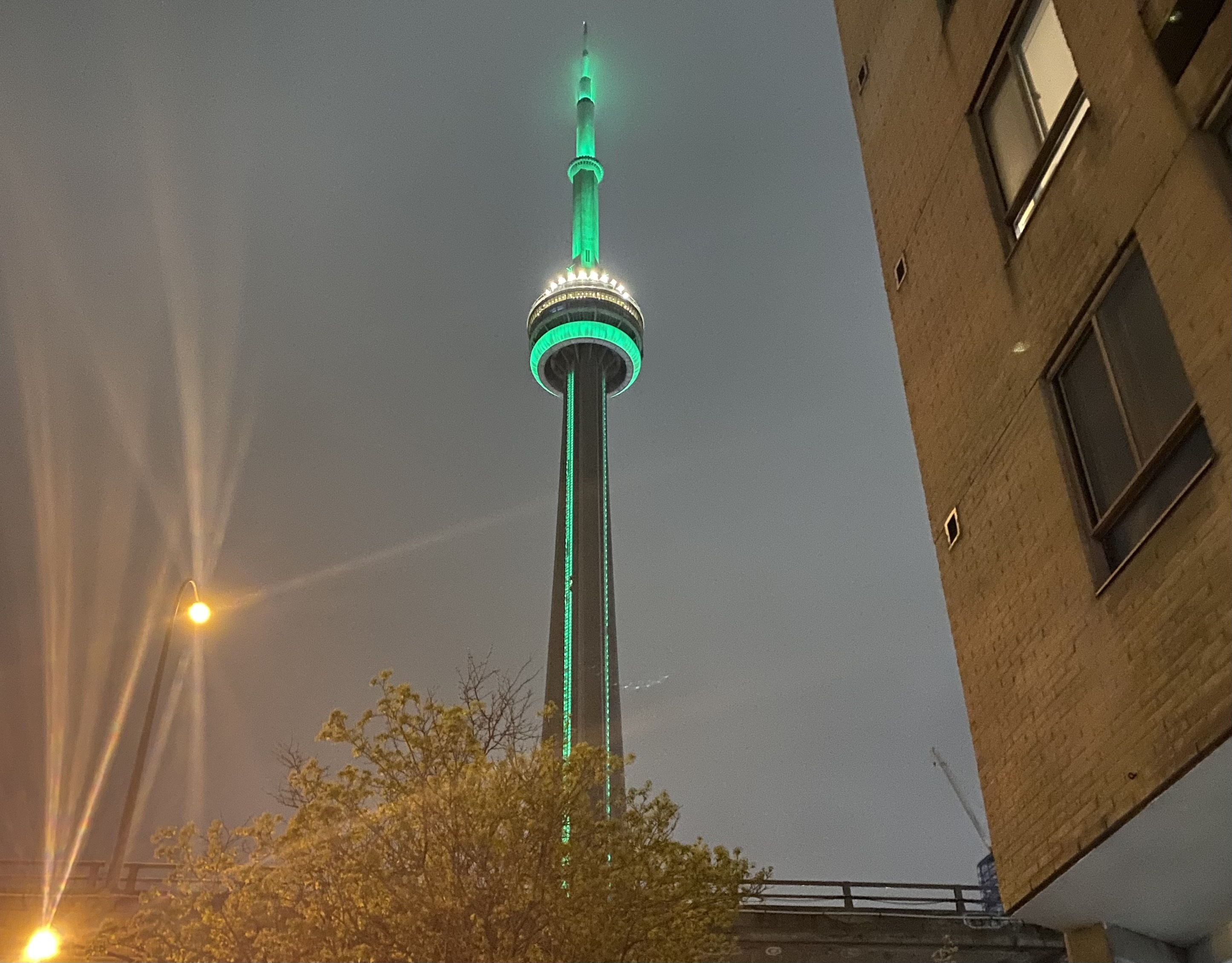
The CN Tower, in Toronto, lit green to mark the coronation

Landmarks across Canada were illuminated emerald green on 6 and 7 May. Tours were offered at Rideau Hall, the official residence of the monarch and governor general of Canada, and the Central Band of the Canadian Armed Forces performed there, while members of the Governor General's Foot Guards performed changing of the guard ceremonies. Several Royal Canadian Legion branches hosted receptions. On 8 May the government announced a donation of $100,000 to the Nature Conservancy of Canada to mark the coronation.

The Department of Canadian Heritage provided $257,000 to the Royal Canadian Geographical Society to produce educational material for schools on the King's association with Indigenous peoples in Canada and his tours of the country, Innovation, Science and Economic Development Canada approved the use of a special call sign in Canada for amateur radio operators to use from 5 May to 2 June.

The government will issue coronation medals to 30,000 Canadians who made significant contributions to the country or their local region. The medal was announced several days before the coronation, on 3 May, although the unveiling its design and its first conferral did not take place until 6 May 2024.

==== Provincial initiatives ====
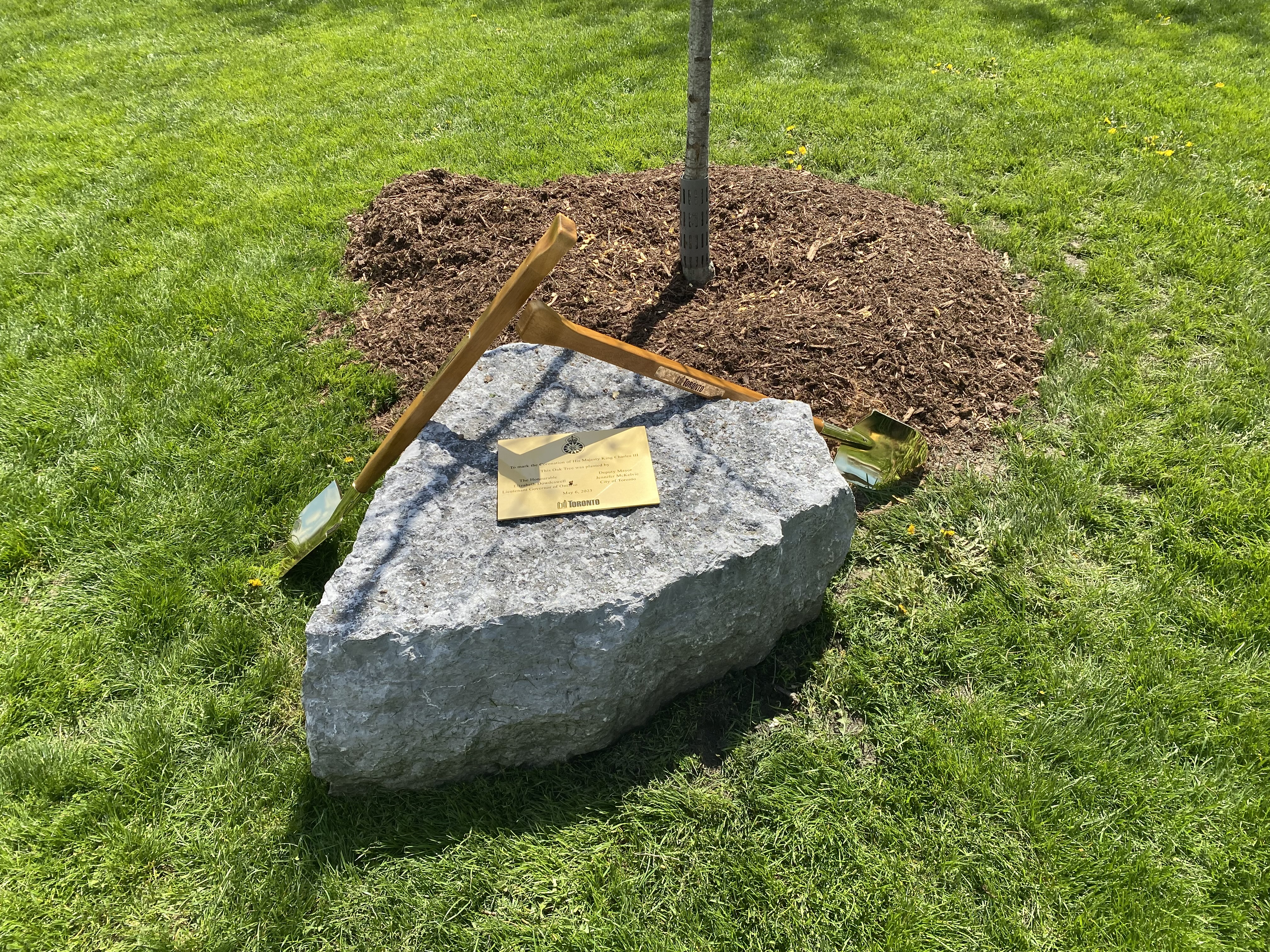
Ceremonial shovels placed next to a plaque to mark the ceremonial tree planting at Coronation Park in Toronto

Lieutenant governors and territorial commissioners organised events that included exhibitions, military parades, and tree plantings. The lieutenant governors of British Columbia, Prince Edward Island, New Brunswick, Newfoundland and Labrador, Nova Scotia, and Saskatchewan hosted events at their respective Government Houses on the 5 or 6 May. Additional events were planned at the government houses of British Columbia, Nova Scotia and Saskatchewan later in the year, including garden parties, the unveiling of a coronation pathway at Government House, British Columbia, and a debut musical performance composed for the coronation by Jeffery Straker at Government House, Saskatchewan. The Lieutenant Governor of Ontario hosted a panel on the coronation with the Empire Club of Canada on 2 May and opened the Lieutenant Governor's Suite at the Ontario Legislative Building to the public as a part of Doors Open Toronto on 27 and 28 May. An event was planned by the Lieutenant Governor of Alberta at the University of Alberta Botanic Garden, although was later cancelled due to the 2023 Alberta wildfires.

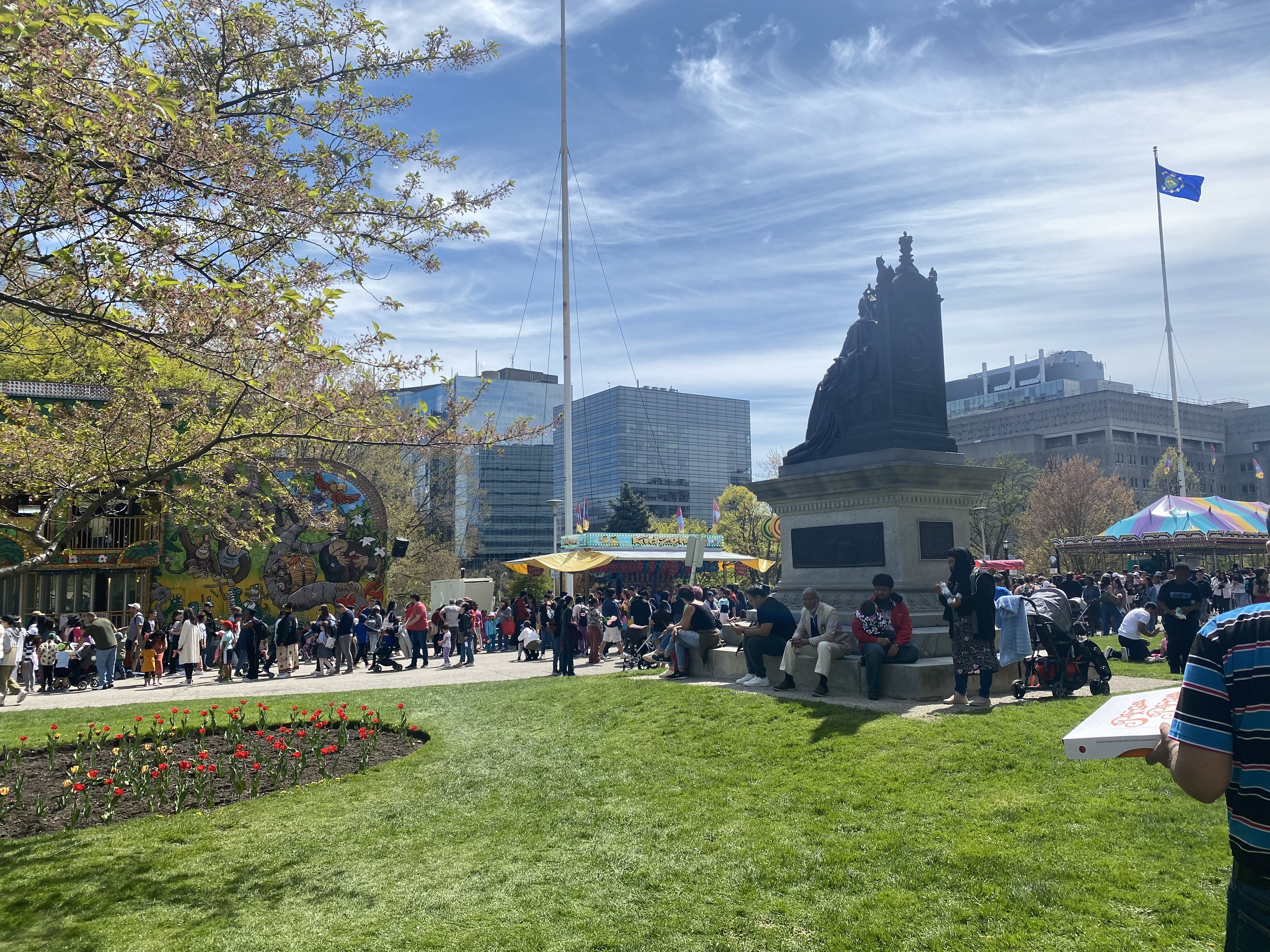
A coronation fair hosted by the government of Ontario at Queen's Park

Other celebrations organised by provincial governments included events organised at the Saskatchewan Legislative Building on 5 May and the Manitoba Legislative Building on 6 May. The government of Ontario hosted a fair at Queen's Park in Toronto and offered free admission to provincially-owned attractions and 39 provincial parks on the date of the coronation. A program by the government of Newfoundland and Labrador to distribute eastern white pine seedlings from the Wooddale Provincial Tree Nursery to the public was launched on 6 May to honour Charles's focus on environmentalism.

Several coronation concerts were also organised. The Office of the Lieutenant Governor of Ontario initiated a six-part coronation concert series for long-term care homes from April to May. Several places hosted concerts during the coronation weekend, including the Cathedral Church of St James in Toronto, Christ Church Cathedral in Victoria, and Knox-Metropolitan United Church in Regina.

=== Australia ===
Celebrating Charles III's coronation as king of Australia, buildings and monuments across the country were illuminated in royal purple on 6 and 7 May. A flag notice was also issued, urging the display of the national flag, the Aboriginal flag, and Torres Strait Islander flag throughout the coronation weekend. On 7 May, the Australia's Federation Guard fired a 21-gun salute from the forecourt of Parliament House. The Royal Australian Air Force also planned a flypast of the forecourt that day, although it was cancelled due to inclement weather. The Federal Executive Council also made a $10,000 donation in the King's name to a charity working to conserve the western ground parrot, as an official "coronation gift" to the King. On 9 May, Prime Minister Anthony Albanese delivered an address of congratulations in the House of Representatives, which was followed by an address from the Deputy Prime Minister Richard Marles and the Leader of the Opposition Peter Dutton.

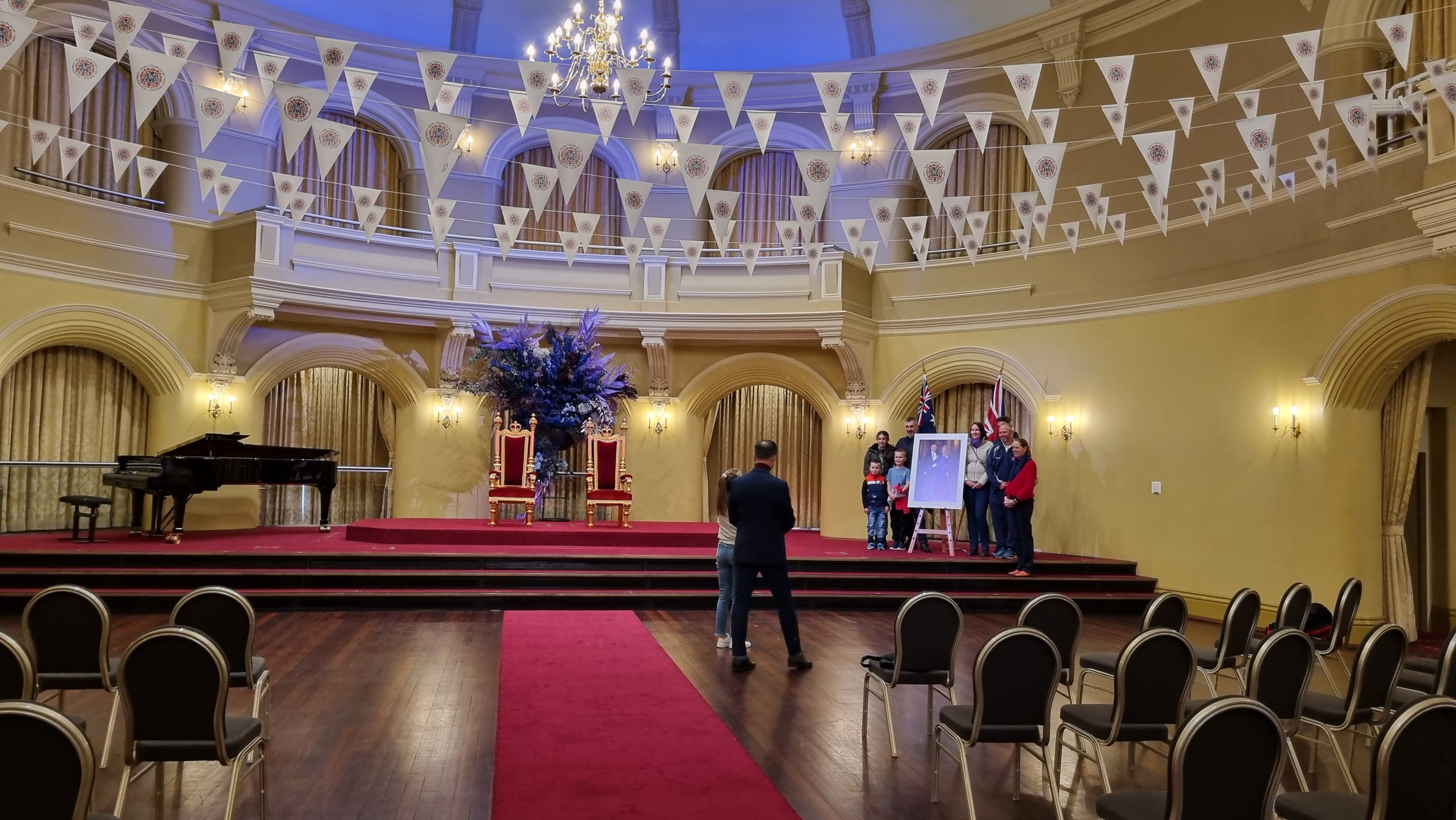
The ballroom of Government House, Perth during an open house to mark the coronation. A group poses next to a photo portrait of Charles and Camilla in the background.

Government Houses in Brisbane, Darwin, Melbourne, Perth, and Sydney hosted open houses on 6 and 7 May, while Government House in Adelaide did the same on 21 May. A low level flypast also took place over Queensland's Government House on Coronation Day. Government Houses in Adelaide, Hobart, and Sydney also hosted garden parties and receptions during the coronation weekend, while a barbecue was held by the Governor-General of Australia at Government House, Canberra on 12 May. Government House, Melbourne held a reception later in the month on 29 May.

The Australian Monarchist League hosted several low-key events and screenings of the coronation on 5 and 6 May, including in Adelaide, Brisbane, Melbourne, Perth, and Sydney; but, opted not to organise street parties over concerns that republican protesters might disrupt them. The Australian Government was criticised by monarchists for not declaring a public holiday, or organising official government events to mark the coronation.

Australia Post released the Coronation of King Charles III commemorative stamp issue in November 2023.

=== New Zealand ===
To celebrate the coronation of Charles III as king of New Zealand, a national event featuring performances was held at the Auckland Domain on 7 May. The New Zealand Defence Force performed a gun salute at Devonport and Point Jerningham in Wellington on the same day.

Trees That Count and the Department of Conservation initiated a tree planting campaign, with the New Zealand Government providing NZ$1 million to support the planting of 100,000 trees by local councils during the coronation weekend. The campaign was launched on the grounds of Parliament House, Wellington on 26 April, during a tree planting ceremony with various parliamentarians, including Prime Minister Chris Hipkins and Opposition Leader Christopher Luxon. Civic tree-planting events were held in several communities from 3 to 10 May.

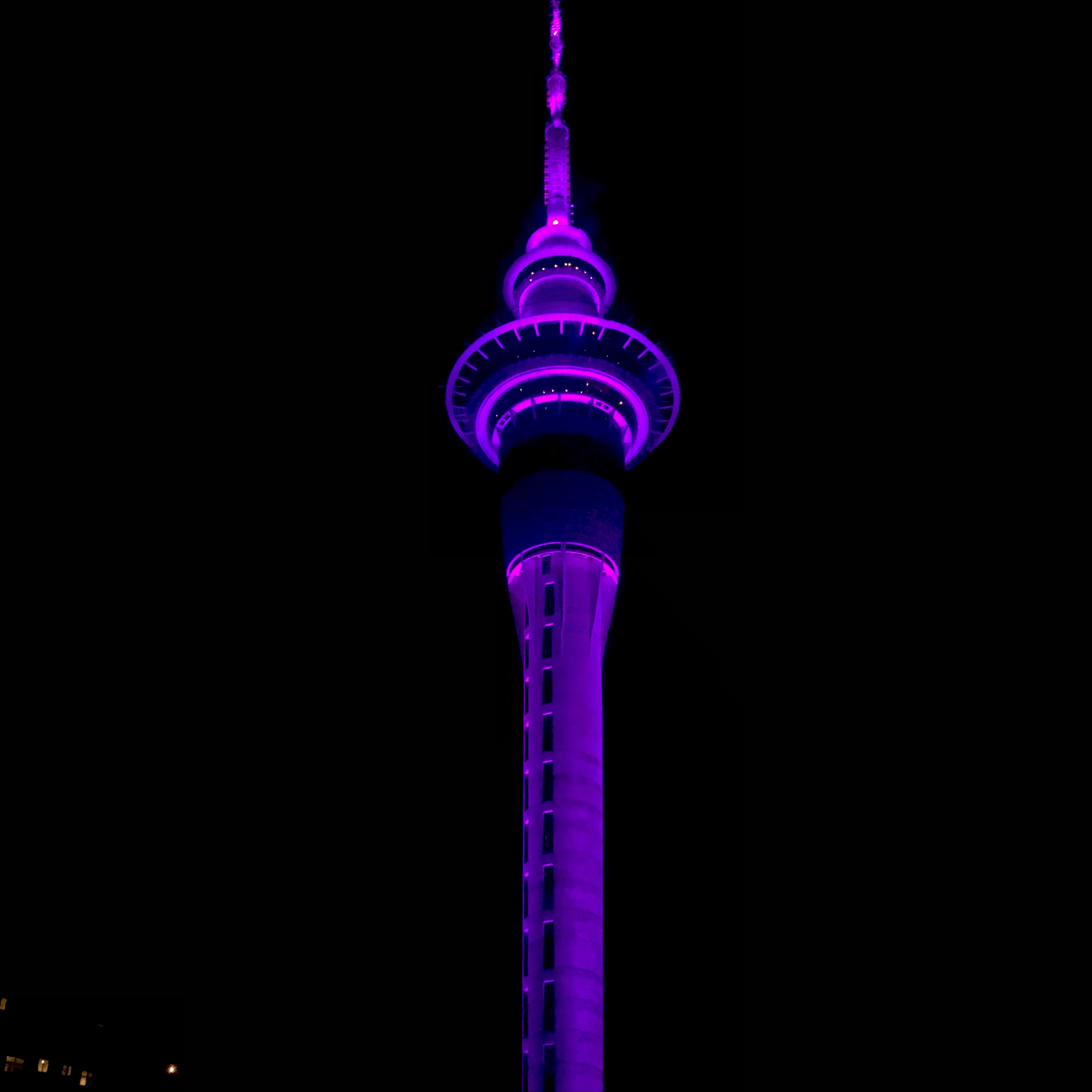
The Sky Tower in Auckland illuminated in purple on 6 May 2023 to mark the coronation

NZ Post released commemorative coins and stamps on 3 May. An initiative to illuminate landmarks in purple also took place in Auckland, Hawera, and Wellington on 6 May. The chefs of Government House shared a Coronation Pie recipe to commemorate the occasion.

Several other public services and private groups also organised commemorative events. The New Zealand Academy of Fine Arts held a special exhibition to mark the coronation from 21 April to 21 May, featuring works from 68 artists and pieces belonging to the Royal New Zealand Navy. Libraries in South Taranaki hosted coronation events from 1 to 6 May. The Wellington Cathedral of St Paul held a coronation festival from 5 to 7 May.

=== Papua New Guinea ===
A ceremony was held at Sir Hubert Murray Stadium in Port Moresby on 6 May to commemorate Charles III's coronation as king of Papua New Guinea. The event was held simultaneously with the coronation ceremony in the United Kingdom. The ceremony included a parade by members of the Papua New Guinea Defence Force, Royal Papua New Guinea Constabulary, Papua New Guinea Fire Services, Papua New Guinea Correctional Services and St John Ambulance, a live screening of the coronation, and various speeches and live musical performances, and a fireworks finale. Keynote speeches were also made by acting Governor-General Job Pomat and Prime Minister James Marape at the ceremony.

=== Solomon Islands ===
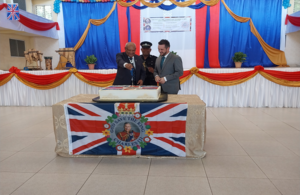
John Patterson, the acting Governor-General of Solomon Islands, cuts a cake with Thomas Coward, British High Commissioner to the Solomon Islands, to mark the coronation.

To celebrate Charles III's coronation as king of Solomon Islands, a wake-up call by drumbeaters, pan pipers and the Royal Solomon Islands Police Force band took place in Honiara on 6 May. A commemorative church service was held at the St Barnabas Provincial Cathedral to celebrate the coronation, which also included a cake-cutting ceremony. The service was attended by several ministers of the Crown, including Prime Minister Manasseh Sogavare. A public musical performance by One Drop Band was also held at the Unity Square, where a photographic slideshow of historic royal visits to Solomon Islands was also displayed.

From 5 to 12 May, the National Art Gallery held an exhibition displaying portraits, historical records, and visits by members of the royal family to Solomon Islands.

=== Antigua and Barbuda ===
Events to mark the coronation of Charles III as king of Antigua and Barbuda took place in St. John's. On 7 May, a parade featuring the Antigua and Barbuda Defence Force (ABDF), Girl Guides, Boy Scouts, Boys and Girls Brigades, The Duke of Edinburgh Award recipients, Seventh Day Adventist Pathfinder, and Cadet Corps marched from the Multipurpose Cultural Centre to Government House. There, a ceremony took place that included a bonfire and performances by the ABDF Band, Salvation Army Timbralists, and SDA Parthfinders Drum Corps. On 8 May, a service of Thanksgiving to mark the occasion took place at the St John's Pentecostal House of Restoration Ministries, where all national honourees of Antigua and Barbuda were invited to pray for the King and Queen.

=== Vanuatu ===
The Kastom people who worshipped Prince Philip on the Vanuatuan island of Tanna marked the coronation of his son. Events were organised in the villages of Yakel and Yaohnanen throughout 6 May, including a flag-raising ceremony of the Union Flag, and drinking and dancing. Around 5,000 to 6,000 people gathered to celebrate, with an additional 100 chiefs also attending.

== Coverage and ratings ==
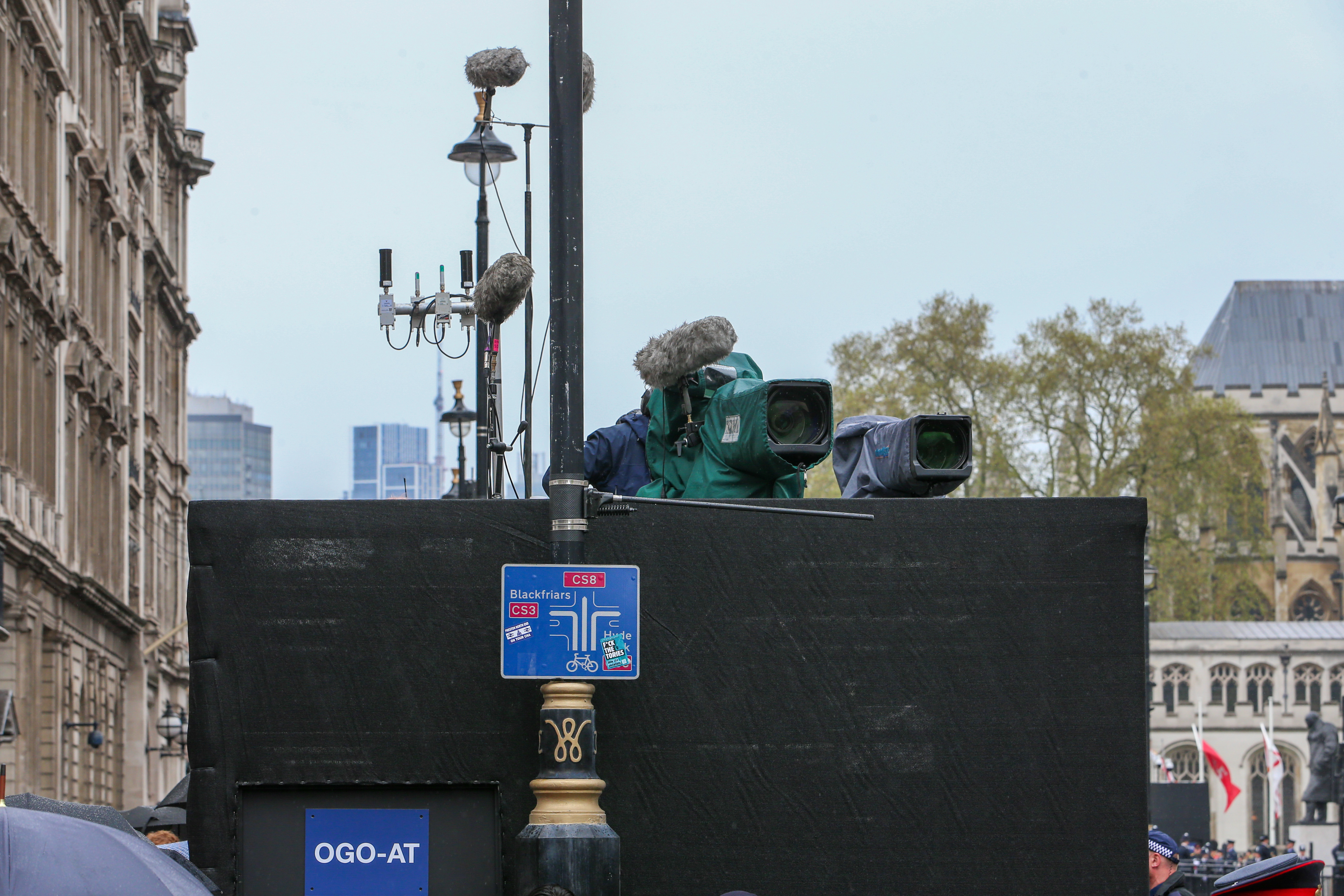
Television cameras set up along the procession route.

The BBC provided the sole feed for the coronation in Ultra-high-definition HDR, a joint project by the BBC Research & Development and BBC Studios Events. Overall, the BBC used 7 outside broadcast trucks and over 100 HDR cameras for the coronation feed, and set up a temporary private 5G network along the Mall with a gigabit of uncontended wireless upload bandwidth for camera feeds. The BBC suspended the television licence fee for the coronation weekend so that venues could screen the coronation on 6 May, and the coronation concert the next day, without needing to buy a television licence. The Department for Culture, Media and Sport announced that the event would be shown on big screens across 57 locations in Britain, including in Hyde Park, Green Park and St James's Park.

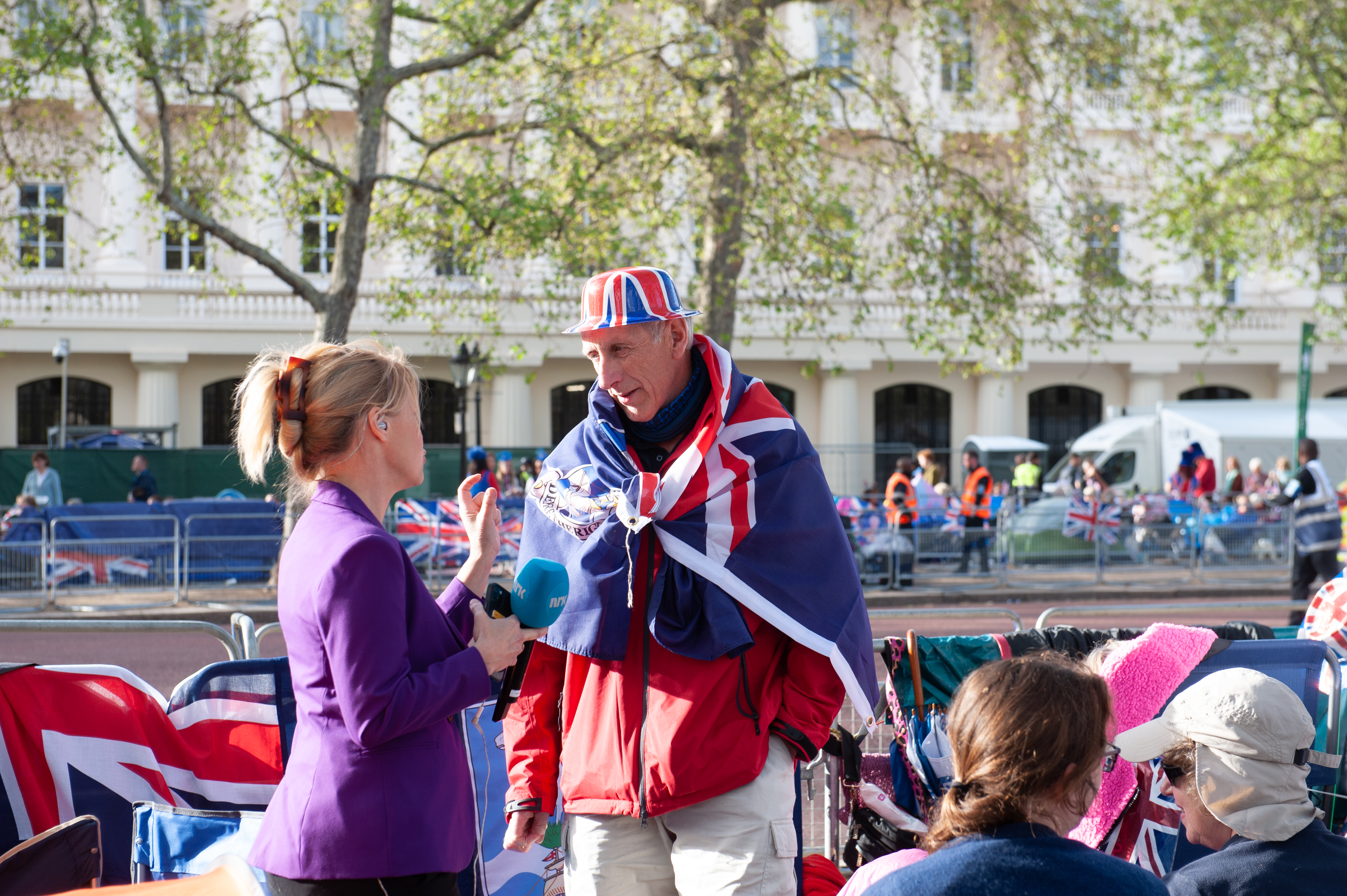
A reporter with the Norwegian Broadcasting Corporation speaking with a spectator on the coronation procession route

Media outlets in United Kingdom, Australia, Austria, Canada, France, Germany, New Zealand and the United States broadcast the coronation live. Several broadcasters in those countries provided coverage of the occasion throughout the coronation weekend.

The coronation was viewed by an average television audience of 18.8 million across 11 channels, with a peak television audience of 20.4 million in the United Kingdom, making it the most-watched broadcast of the year. The BBC showed the coronation on BBC One, BBC Two with British Sign Language interpretation and the BBC News Channel, and its peak audience of 15.5 million was the largest of any broadcaster. ITV had an audience of 3.6 million people, with ITV3 carrying British Sign Language interpretation from 10:45 am to 1 pm, and a further 800,000 watched on Sky News and Sky Showcase.

Outside the United Kingdom, the ceremony was watched by over 3 million people in Australia, 7.6 million people in Canada, 1.2 million people in New Zealand, nearly 9 million people in France, over 4.8 million people in Germany, and 12 million people in the US.

According to the Department for Culture, Media and Sport's annual report, the coronation reached an estimated audience of 2 billion people across 125 countries.

== Reactions ==
=== Public opinion ===
Multiple public opinion surveys related to the coronation were conducted in the United Kingdom in the lead-up to the event. In a YouGov survey conducted in April 2023, 46 per cent of respondents stated they would watch the event on television; a similar poll conducted by Ipsos in May 2023 indicated that 40 per cent of British adults intended to watch the ceremony, with 29 per cent stating they had no plans to celebrate the event. Another YouGov surveys taken during that period found that 64 per cent of respondents did not care about the ceremony, "very much" or "at all", with 33 per cent caring "a great deal" or "a fair amount". A third YouGov survey found that 51 per cent of respondents believed that the coronation should not be financed by taxpayers.

YouGov also conducted a poll in Australia, where it found that 57 per cent of respondents expressed some interest in the coronation, with 14 per cent being very interested in the event. Among the respondents, 43 per cent expressed no interest in the coronation.

An Angus Reid Institute poll in Canada found that 59 per cent of respondents paid some attention to the coronation, with 9 per cent of respondents highly anticipating the event, 20 per cent of respondents stating they would likely watch the coronation, and 29 per cent planning to read about it. Among the respondents, 41 per cent expressed no interest in the coronation.

==== Post-coronation ====
A post-coronation poll conducted by Ipsos found that both Charles and William received higher public satisfaction ratings in the UK following the coronation. However, unlike earlier jubilees and royal events, support for the institution itself saw no boost as a result of the coronation, with 61 per cent of respondents stating that the event had no impact on their perception of the monarchy. Among the respondents, 19 per cent reported that the coronation had a positive impact on their perception of the institution, while another 19 per cent stated that the event had an adverse effect on their perception of the monarchy.

=== Protests ===
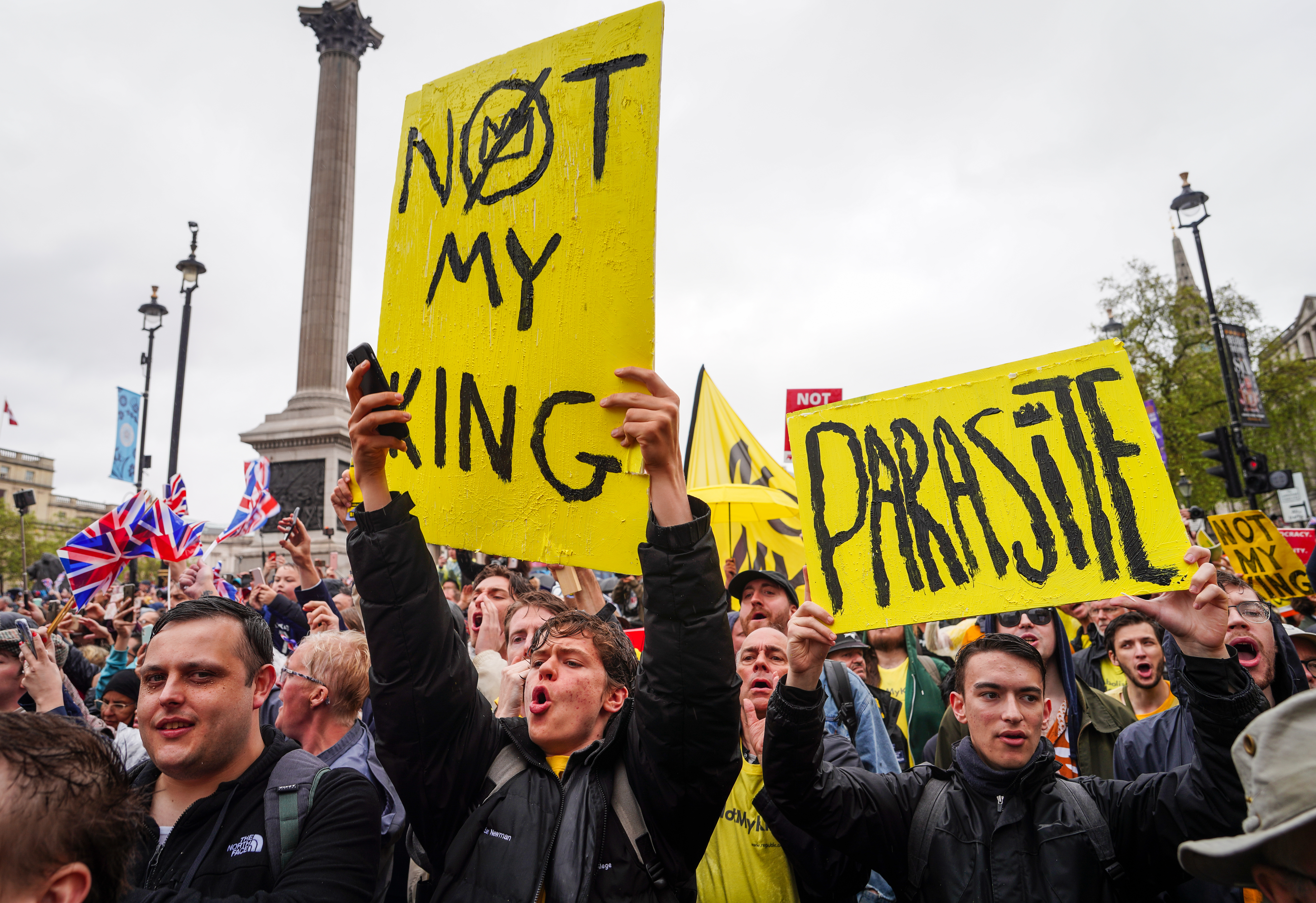
The "Abolish the Monarchy" demonstration in Trafalgar Square while the coronation was occurring

The British republican group Republic protested against the coronation in London; its chief executive, Graham Smith, called the ceremony a "celebration of hereditary power and privilege". The organisation anticipated an attendance of around 1,500–2,000 in Trafalgar Square, the focus of the London protests, with smaller groups of one to three people spread throughout the procession route. However, according to BBC News, the number of protestors was only in the hundreds. Republic encouraged protesters to wear yellow during the protest.

Pro–Scottish independence and republican marches took place in both Edinburgh and Glasgow on the day of the coronation. The group All Under One Banner marched in Glasgow, and the Radical Independence Campaign and Our Republic in Edinburgh. The latter group also promoted the Declaration of Calton Hill during its march.

The Welsh republican advocacy group Cymru Republic staged a protest on 6 May in Cardiff, with a march from the statue of Aneurin Bevan to Bute Park. Around 300 protesters took part.

==== Security arrangements ====
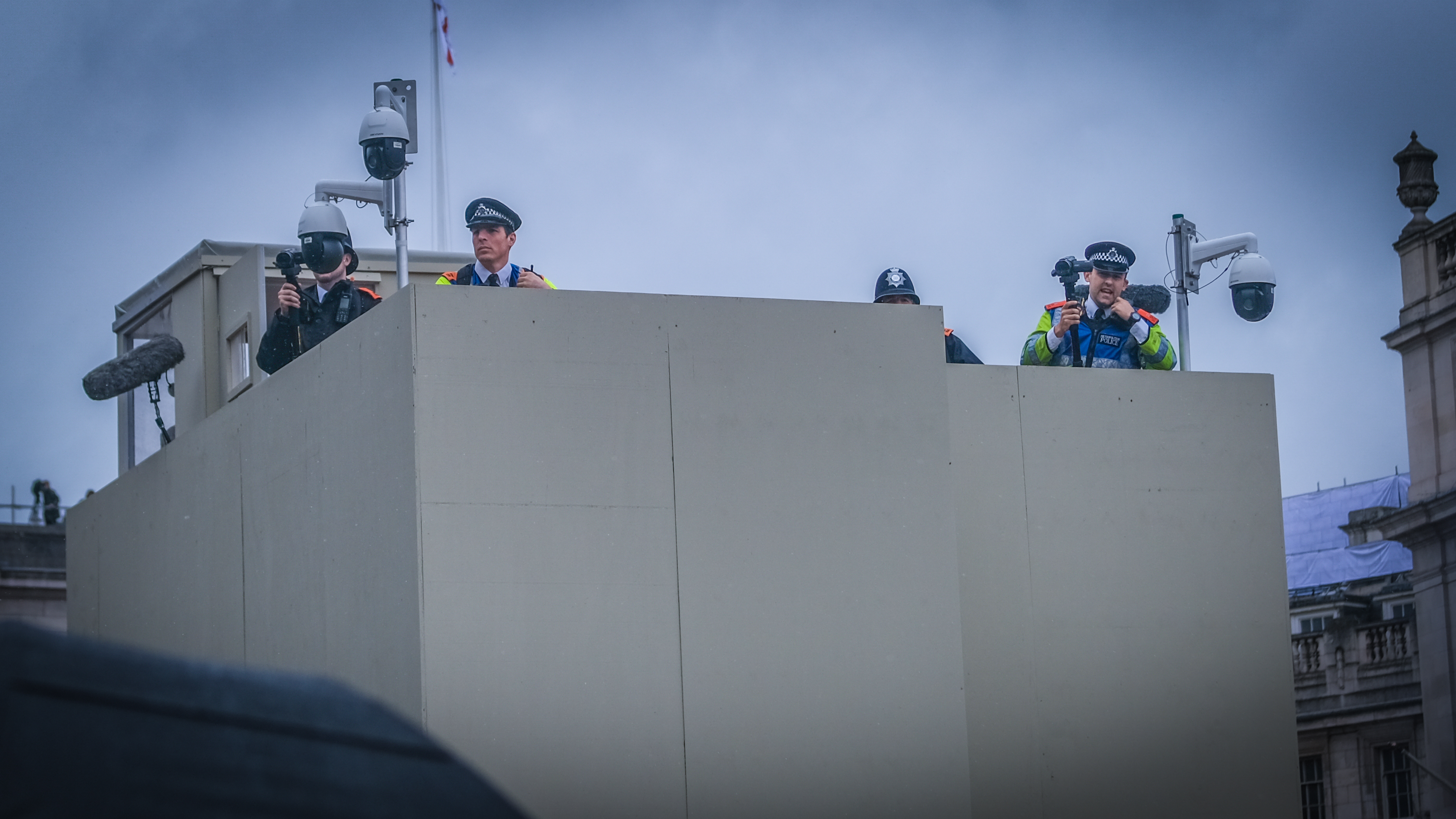
A police surveillance booth on the coronation procession route

To manage disruptive protests and deter potential threats and criminal activities at the event, the police and security services from across the United Kingdom deployed a large number of physical barriers, armed officers, and police drones in London. Over 11,500 police officers were on duty on the day of the coronation, and units of the UK Counter Terrorism Defence Mechanism were also placed on standby. Extensive security planning had been ongoing for several years leading up to the coronation as part of Operation Golden Orb.

Republic had been engaged in consultations with the police in the months leading up to the event regarding their demonstration plans. They had been assured by the police until 5 May that there would be no complications with their protest.

==== Arrests ====
The Metropolitan Police stated that of the 64 arrests made on the day of the coronation, 52 were related to "concerns people were going to disrupt the event, and arrests included to prevent a breach of the peace and conspiracy to cause a public nuisance"; the other 12 were made for other offences. Those arrested included individuals from Animal Rising, eight members from Just Stop Oil, and six members from Republic, including their chief executive, Graham Smith. An Australian bystander who was mistaken for a Just Stop Oil protester was also arrested.

The Metropolitan Police said that some arrests were due to plans by protesters to "throw rape alarms" in an attempt to startle horses in the parade, potentially injuring riders and spectators, something about which they had briefed Oliver Dowden, the deputy prime minister, in April 2023. Three members of the women's safety campaign group Night Stars were arrested for distributing rape alarms to women in Westminster, prompting criticism from the Green Party politician Caroline Russell.

Human Rights Watch described the arrests as alarming and something "you would expect to see in Moscow not London". On 8 May the Metropolitan Police apologised to six of the arrested protesters, including Smith, after a review found no proof that the protesters in question were going to engage in unlawful behaviour. The Metropolitan Police expressed "regret" over the arrest of Smith and the five other protesters. Smith indicated that he would not be willing to accept the apology, and that he would be considering legal action. The City of Westminster Council have requested an apology from the police for the arrest of the night voluntary workers.

The Home Affairs Committee was to hold an evidence session on the policing of the coronation and arrest of republican protesters on 17 May. The Metropolitan Police and Lincolnshire Police also submitted a voluntary complaint referral to the Independent Office for Police Conduct concerning the arrest of the Australian bystander on 17 May. The Mayor of London has also demanded answers from the Metropolitan Police over the arrests.

=== Reparatory demands ===
In the lead-up to the coronation, indigenous republican and reparations campaigners from 12 Commonwealth realms signed an open letter to Charles, asking him to formally apologise for the effects of British colonialism and to begin a "process of reparatory justice". The prime ministers of Belize, Saint Kitts and Nevis, and Saint Vincent and the Grenadines, used the occasion to argue that Britain should apologise for the slave trade.

The use of the Cullinan diamonds in the coronation was controversial in South Africa. The ceremony prompted some South Africans to demand their return, following a petition on the same topic after the death of Queen Elizabeth II which attracted 8,000 signatures.

=== Republicanism ===
Marlene Malahoo Forte, the minister of legal and constitutional affairs of Jamaica, used the coronation to emphasise the Jamaican government's intention to transition to being a republic as early as 2024, and that the coronation had accelerated the government's plans for a referendum on the subject. A constitutional reform committee on the issue was set up earlier in 2023.

The prime ministers of Belize, Saint Kitts and Nevis, and Saint Vincent and the Grenadines voiced their desires for their respective countries to transition towards a republic. A constitutional commission to look into the issue was formed in November 2022 in Belize. In the lead-up to the coronation, the prime ministers of Saint Kitts and Nevis and Saint Vincent and the Grenadines also pledged to create constitutional commissions to look into the issue.

In the lead-up to the coronation, republicans in Australia criticised Prime Minister Anthony Albanese for attending the coronation, and he faced pressure from republicans to not partake in the oath of allegiance.

=== Reaction from international leaders ===
Leaders from around the world congratulated the King and Queen both before and after the event. Heads of state and government included Chinese President Xi Jinping, French President Emmanuel Macron, German Chancellor Olaf Scholz, Indian Prime Minister Narendra Modi, Italian Prime Minister Giorgia Meloni, Morocco's King Mohammed VI, Norway's King Harald V, Philippine President Bongbong Marcos, Singapore Prime Minister Lee Hsien Loong, Ugandan president Yoweri Museveni, US President Joe Biden and Ukraine's President Volodymyr Zelenskyy. Well wishes were also sent from the president of the European Commission Ursula von der Leyen, the president of the European Council Charles Michel, the president of the European Central Bank Christine Lagarde and the secretary general of NATO Jens Stoltenberg.

== See also ==
- Canadian Coronation Contingent
- Coronation of the British monarch
- List of British coronations
- List of people involved in coronations of the British monarch

== Bibliography ==
- Blair, Claude, ed. (1998). The Crown Jewels: The History of the Coronation Regalia …. The Stationery Office. ISBN 978-0-11-701359-9.
