= Dents =

British manufacturer of leather goods

- Type: Public limited company
- Industry: Fashion
- Founded: 1777 in Worcester, England
- Founder: John Dent
- Headquarters: Warminster, Wiltshire, England
- Products: Gloves; Fashion accessories
- Parent: Dewhurst Dent plc
- Website: www.dentsgloves.com

Dents is a British manufacturer of gloves and leather goods, founded by John Dent in Worcester, England in 1777. The company developed from a traditional glove-making business into an international manufacturer and retailer. Its headquarters and manufacturing facilities are in Warminster, Wiltshire, where it continues to produce its Heritage Collection using traditional glove-making techniques.

The company has a long association with the British royal family and it holds a royal warrant as glove manufacturer to King Charles III. Dents gloves have been used in film and television productions, including the James Bond film Skyfall.

== History ==
Dents was established in Worcester in 1777 as a manufacturer of fine leather gloves by John Dent (1751–1811). It is possibly Britain's oldest existing fashion manufacturer. Dent's sons, John and William, helped the company expand throughout the 18th and 19th centuries. In 1845, mechanical sewing was introduced to the company to assist craftspeople.

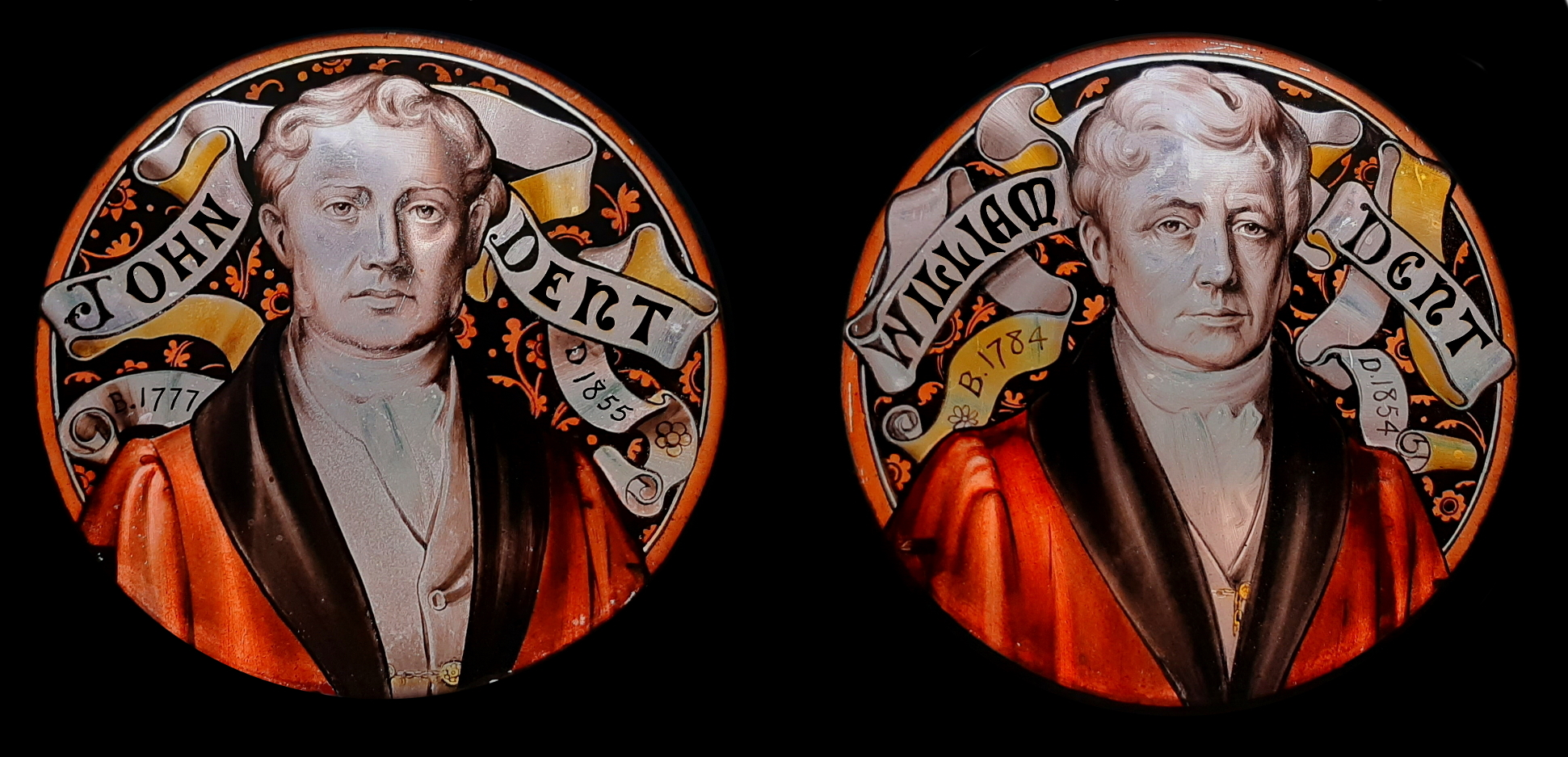
John and William Dent

In 1847, the business became Dent, Allcroft & Co. when John Derby Allcroft ran the company. Under Allcroft, annual production quadrupled to over 12 million pairs in 1884 and Dents became the premier glove producer in the world.

Dents is also known for historically providing leather gloves to the British royal family, such as George VI and Elizabeth II's coronation gloves. Dents' Museum holds gloves worn by Lord Nelson, and Queen Victoria.

The company has a factory in Warminster, Wiltshire, having been present in the town since 1937. Since sometime before 1992, the company has been a subsidiary of Dewhurst Dent plc, a maker of fashion accessories based in Bolton.

== Manufacturing and craftsmanship ==
Dents established its presence in Warminster in 1937, and the town became the centre of its British manufacturing operations. The Warminster premises combine manufacturing facilities with the company's headquarters.

Traditional glove manufacture involves several stages, including the selection and cutting of leather, sewing, assembly and finishing. Glove pieces are cut from patterns, with the arrangement of the pattern on the hide affecting the shape and fit of the finished glove. Dents has used patterns in its manufacturing process for many years, including patterns dating from the nineteenth century.

The construction of a glove requires the accurate joining of numerous small components. These include the palm and fingers, thumb and fourchettes, with some styles also incorporating triangular pieces known as quirks, which allow greater movement between the fingers. At the Warminster factory, gloves have been sewn using specialist machinery, including older Singer sewing machines, alongside hand-sewn construction for some styles.

The manufacturing process also includes finishing the completed gloves on heated hand forms to shape and smooth the leather. The properties of different leathers, including their thickness, grain and elasticity, influence the cutting and construction process.

The Heritage Collection continues to be manufactured in England at the Warminster factory.

== Products ==
Gloves remain Dents' principal product. The company produces men's and women's gloves in leather and knitted materials. Its range includes traditional dress gloves, driving gloves, touchscreen-compatible gloves, lined and unlined gloves, and styles designed to provide water resistance. Gloves are made from a variety of leathers and constructions, including deerskin, hairsheep and peccary.

Peccary leather is among the more specialised materials used by Dents. Obtained from a wild pig native to Central and South America, it is valued for its distinctive grain, softness and durability. Peccary leather is relatively less commonly available than many other glove leathers and is used for some of Dents' higher-priced gloves.

Dents also produce leather accessories including belts, wallets and other small leather goods. Its wider product range has included hats, scarves and knitwear.

== Royal warrants ==
The company produced gloves associated with the coronations of King George VI in 1937 and Queen Elizabeth II in 1953, and its historical material includes examples of gloves connected with earlier members of the royal family. Dents also made the coronation glove originally worn by King George VI in 1937, which was subsequently worn by King Charles III at his coronation in 2023.

In 2016, Dents was granted a royal warrant of appointment as Manufacturer of Gloves to the Prince of Wales. In 2024, Dents was granted a royal warrant as manufacturer of gloves to King Charles III. The Royal Warrant Holders Association lists the warrant under Dents, a division of Dewhurst Dent plc.

== Film and television ==
Dents gloves have been used in film productions, including the James Bond series and the 1989 film Batman. The company's involvement has included gloves worn by principal characters as part of their costumes.

In Skyfall (2012), Daniel Craig wears black unlined leather gloves as James Bond. The style was marketed by Dents as the "Daniel" gloves.

In Spectre (2015), Craig wears Dents "Fleming" leather driving gloves. The gloves appear during the Rome sequence, including scenes in which Bond drives the Aston Martin DB10. Dents subsequently produced the style as part of its range of leather driving gloves.

Dents gloves also appeared in No Time to Die (2021). Lashana Lynch, playing Nomi, wears black fingerless leather driving gloves while driving an Aston Martin DBS Superleggera. The style was identified as the "Lashana" fingerless driving glove.

The company also supplied gloves for the 1989 film Batman. The Dents glove museum contains gloves and a pattern made for Michael Keaton's portrayal of Batman in the film. A purple glove associated with Jack Nicholson's portrayal of the Joker was sold at auction. The glove, signed by Nicholson, sold for US$10,400 at Julien's Auctions in 2023, after receiving 19 bids and exceeding its presale estimate of US$3,000–5,000. The glove retained a Dents label on its interior.

Television productions have also featured Dents gloves. In Mr Selfridge, the company supplied red leather gloves with button detailing for the period costume designs.

Other period films have used gloves supplied by Dents. In 2017, the Worshipful Company of Glovers reported that Dents had provided gloves for Goodbye Christopher Robin and Murder on the Orient Express.

== Fashion collaborations ==
Dents has also collaborated with fashion houses and designers. The 2019 exhibition "Christian Dior: Designer of Dreams" at the Victoria and Albert Museum documented Dior's creative collaborations with British manufacturers, including Dents for gloves.

== Corporate structure ==
The Dents brand operates as a division of Dewhurst Dent plc. Dewhurst Dent plc is a public limited company registered in the United Kingdom. Companies House records its registered office in Wiltshire. The company was incorporated in 1919 as Dent Fownes Limited. It became Dewhurst Dent Limited in 1977 and Dewhurst Dent plc in 1982.

In 2023, the headquarters became the temporary storage location for the collection of Fashion Museum Bath while work was undertaken towards the development of a new museum in Bath.

== Personal lives ==
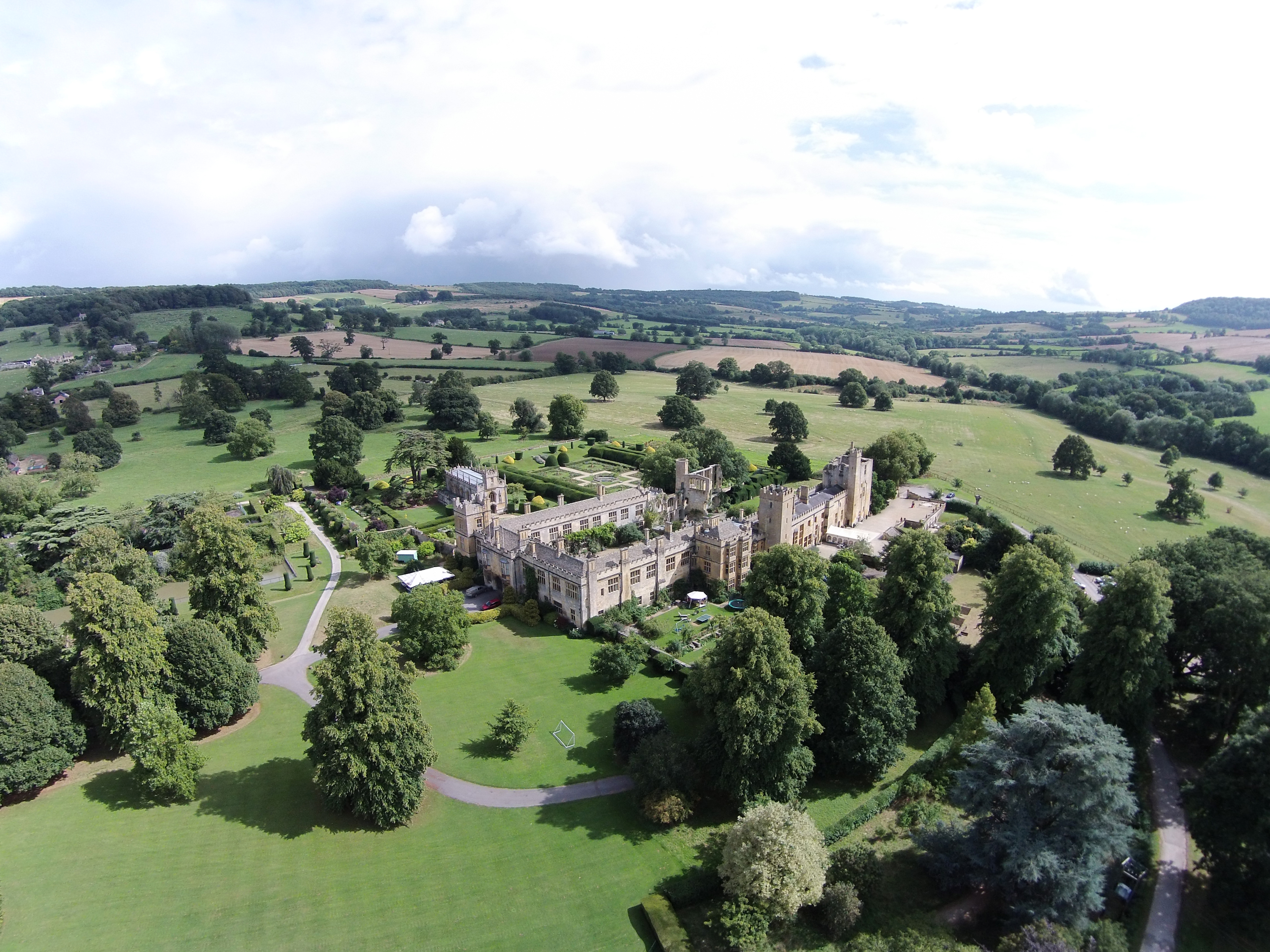
Aerial photo of Sudeley Castle

In 1837, John and William Dent purchased Sudeley Castle which had been the home of former queen Catherine Parr who died in 1548. The castle and chapel were "ruinous" at the time, having been extensively damaged during the Civil War.

The Dents' restoration of the castle was quite sensitive, deciding to not entirely rebuild the castle, rather leaving part of it as picturesque ruins, giving the castle much of its character still seen today. One reliable source states that the restoration was directed by George Gilbert Scott, "working on the western side of the inner court in the style of the existing Medieval and Elizabethan buildings"; Gilbert Scott subsequently began the restoration of the castle's free-standing St Mary's chapel.

When Sudeley was habitable again, the brothers set about filling the castle with artworks. After their deaths, their nephew, John Coucher Dent, inherited the castle in 1855. He and his wife Emma Dent continued the restoration.
