= Indarjit Singh =

British journalist and broadcaster (born 1932)

The Right Honourable The Lord Singh of Wimbledon CBE
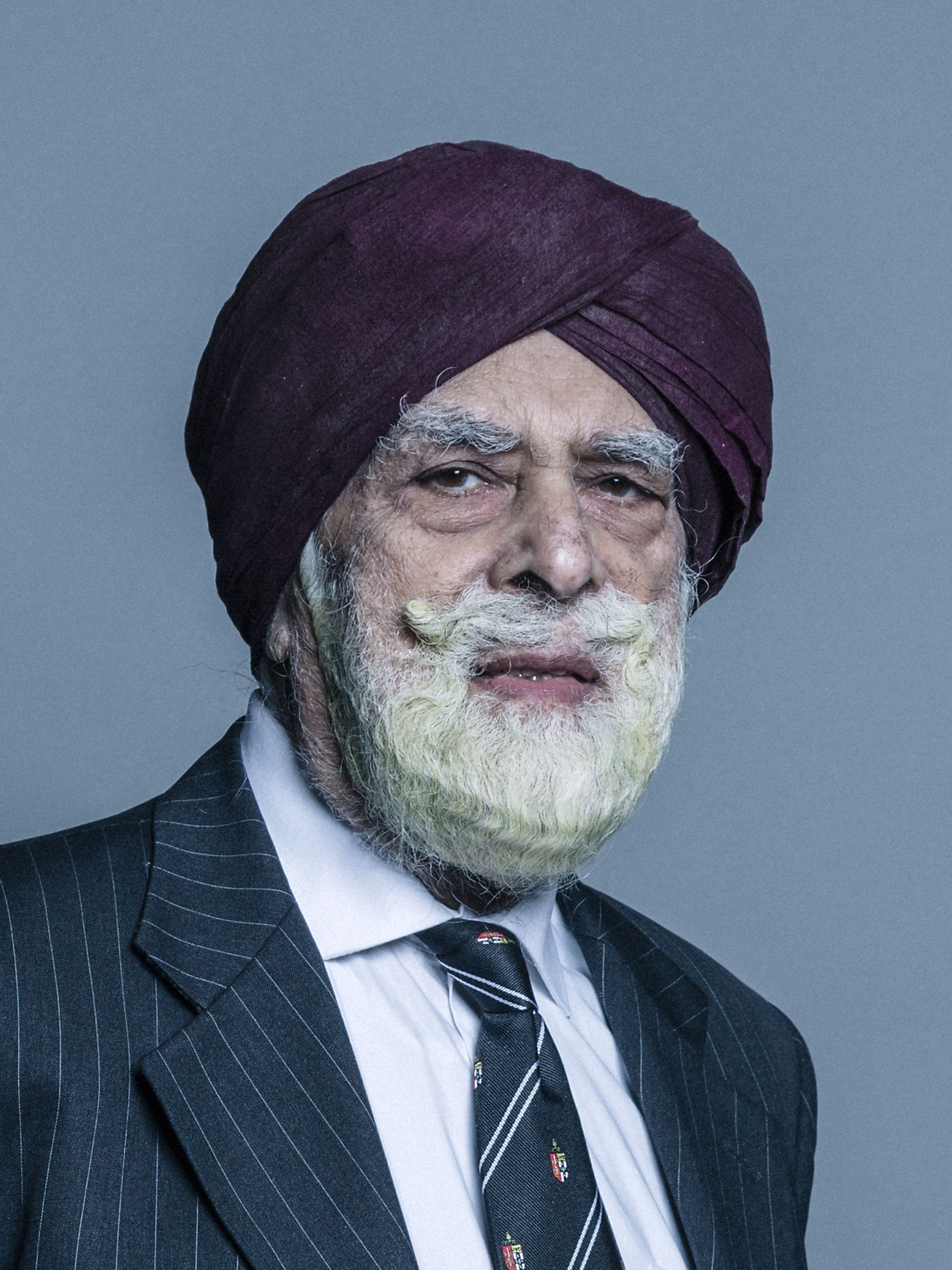
- Official portrait, 2018

Member of the House of Lords
- Lord Temporal
- Life peerage 12 October 2011

Personal details
- Born: 17 September 1932 (age 94) Rawalpindi, British India
- Party: Crossbench
- Spouse: Kanwaljit Singh
- Education: University of Birmingham
- Occupation: Journalist, engineer, politician

Indarjit Singh, Baron Singh of Wimbledon, CBE (born 17 September 1932), sometimes transliterated Inderjit Singh, is a British journalist and broadcaster, a prominent British Indian active in Sikh and interfaith activities, and a member of the House of Lords. He is often described as the de-facto leader of the British Sikh community.

He is the editor of the Sikh Messenger, and known as a former presenter of the Thought for the Day segment on BBC Radio 4's Today programme, and BBC Radio 2's Pause for Thought. He founded the Network of Sikh Organisations (UK) and remains its director. He also contributes to British and overseas newspapers and journals including The Times, The Guardian and The Independent.

== Early life ==
Singh was born on 17 September 1932 in Rawalpindi, then in the British Indian province of the Punjab. His father, Diwan Singh, was a medical doctor who was involved in the nonviolent Gurdwara Reform Movement, bandaging those who had been injured by the British response. His involvement here and in the wider Indian independence movement led to his exile, first to East Africa and then to Britain, where he would choose to remain after receiving further medical qualifications. Singh would then move to Britain with his mother in 1933. His father later became a general practitioner after struggling to find a job in local hospitals due to discrimination, and went on to become the president of the Khalsa Jatha Gurdwara, the oldest and first gurdwara in both Britain and Europe.

He was raised in Birmingham, attending Bishop Vesey's Grammar School in Sutton Coldfield, where he faced prejudice by his fellow students and teachers, which prompted him and his younger brother to take up boxing. Singh recalled that one history teacher once said to him about Indians: "They come over here, they get educated, and they go back to India to harass us!". He went on to study engineering at Birmingham University, from 1953 to 1959.

== Career and activism ==
=== Early career and activism ===
After graduating in 1959, Singh applied to the National Coal Board to become a mine manager, but was rejected on the basis that the miners "wouldn't like an Indian manager". Instead, he decided to leave for India, working as a mine manager in West Bengal for six years. His time in India was marked by the increasing tensions between Sikhs and Hindus due to the Punjabi Suba movement, with Singh becoming increasingly concerned with what he perceived as the marginalisation of Sikhs in India. Believing that any article written by a Sikh would be rejected, Singh wrote to the Hindustan Times under the English pseudonym "Victor Pendry", a name he took from his neighbour back in Birmingham. His letter criticising the discrimination of Sikhs was published, and reportedly attracted considerable attention from the Sikh community.

Singh and his family would move back to Britain in 1967, working as a civil engineer for the construction company Costain, where he would work for eight years. He would go on to work as a management consultant for local government in London in 1975, which he would do for eighteen years until his retirement.

From 1967, Singh would write regularly for the Sikh Courier, but would leave the paper due to disagreements with the owner over his proposed articles regarding the Sikh-Hindu communal violence in India at the time, founding the Sikh Messenger in 1983 in response, of which he remains the editor. That same year, he would stand as an expert witness in the historic Mandla v Dowell-Lee case, which resulted in Sikhs being protected under the Race Relations Act 1976, advocating for the right of Sikh men to wear the turban without facing discrimination or being forced to take it off.

=== Later career and activism ===
Singh co-founded the Inter Faith Network alongside other religious leaders in 1987, remaining as its co-Chair until 1990. He has advised, or been a member of, official bodies, including the Commission for Racial Equality and the Home Secretary’s Advisory Council on Race Relations since 1992. He founded the Network of Sikh Organisations (UK) in 1994, a charity that links all Sikh bodies and gurudwaras in Britain and promotes Sikh interests, of which he remains the director of. He is the Director of both the Sikh Prison Chaplaincy Service and the Sikh Armed Services Chaplaincy Endorsing Authority, and has been an advisor to the Global Sikh Council since 2021. He became the first Sikh to address an audience at the Vatican, advocating for the importance of interfaith dialogue.

He regularly represents the Sikh community at civic occasions, such as the Commonwealth Day Service and the Remembrance Day Service at the Cenotaph in Whitehall, London. He was invited in 2011 to the wedding of Prince William of Wales and Catherine Middleton as a representative for the Sikh faith, and to the coronation of Charles III and Camilla in 2023, where he was chosen to present the Royal Glove to the King.

His participation in the Thought for the Day feature on BBC Radio 4's Today programme lasted from around 1984 to 2019. He left after editorial disagreements with the BBC.

==== Peerage ====
On the recommendation of the House of Lords Appointments Commission, he was created a Crossbench (independent) life peer on 12 October 2011 taking the title Baron Singh of Wimbledon, of Wimbledon in the London Borough of Merton. He was introduced in the House of Lords on 24 October 2011, being the first member of the House of Lords to wear a turban. In the introduction ceremony, his Senior Supporter was The Baroness Kennedy of The Shaws and his Junior Supporter was The Lord Carey of Clifton.

His time as a peer has been focused on international affairs, crime, and education. He served as a member of the Human Rights Joint Committee in the House of Lords from July 2019 to January 2023. That same month in 2019, Preet Kaur Gill lodged a complaint against Singh with the House of Lords Commissioner for Standards, alleging bullying and harassment of a sexist nature. The complaint arose from disagreements concerning the representation of Sikhs in the 2021 census, and Singh's opposition to the inclusion of a "Sikh ethnic tick-box", as proposed by Gill. In January 2021, the Commissioner dismissed the complaint, concluding that the evidence did not establish harassment or bullying, but that Singh had demonstrated discourteous behaviour towards Gill. He, alongside other prominent religious leaders in Britain, condemned the Rwanda asylum plan as "pandering to bigotry" in May 2023.

Following the beginning of the Gaza war in October 2023, he has made multiple controversial statements in the House of Lords regarding Israel and its conduct, such as that month, when he alleged that the Israel Defense Forces (IDF) had been using white phosphorus munitions in Gaza. This prompted Howard Leigh, Baron Leigh of Hurley, to ask Singh to withdraw his statement, as the IDF had denied said allegations, leading to Singh answering back: "Is Amnesty International deliberately telling untruths?" Subsequent investigations by Human Rights Watch and Amnesty International verified videos of artillery-fired white phosphorus airbursts over Gaza City on 10–11 October 2023, and a later United Nations report documented at least 24 instances of white phosphorus use in Gaza between November 2023 and April 2024. In another incident, in November 2026, when debating the government's increase in funding for Jewish security, Singh stated to the House: "The threat to the British Jewish community has undoubtedly increased due to the Jewish community's inexplicable silence over Israeli genocide in Gaza", a sentiment he had previously expressed in April. Both Claudia Mendoza, chair of the Jewish Leadership Council, and Lord Ian Austin—who has served as the UK's trade envoy to Israel since 2019 and is a prominent pro-Israel voice for the House of Lords—condemned Lord Singh's remarks as "reprehensible" and "disgusting".

== Personal life ==
Singh is married to Dr Kanwaljit Singh OBE, a retired teacher and school inspector. They met in India in the 1960s, and have lived in Wimbledon since 1974. They have two daughters and five grandchildren. Singh and his family remain practising Sikhs.

== Awards and honours ==
In 1989, he received the Templeton Award for services to spirituality. In 1991 he received the Inter faith Medallion for services to religious broadcasting. In 2004, he joined Benjamin Zephaniah and Peter Donohoe in being awarded an honorary doctorate (Doctor of Laws) from the University of Leicester. He came second to Bob Geldof in the BBC Radio 4's 2004 People's Lord poll. An Officer of the Order of the British Empire (OBE) since June 1996, Singh was appointed Commander of the Order of the British Empire (CBE) in the 2009 New Year Honours.

== Arms ==
Upon becoming a Lord, Singh received a coat of arms with a baronial coronet and, notably, the Khanda as his crest.

Coat of arms of Indarjit Singh
Notes The coat of arms displays two mottos: "Manas ki jat sabhe eke paichanbo" and its English translation, "Recognise the oneness of our human family". Crest The Khandra Azure Escutcheon Azure a representation of the Golden Temple at Amritsar Proper and in base two Sikh Swords crossed in saltire Argent surmounted at the intersection by a quill pen palewise Or. Supporters Dexter a lion armed Or resting the interior foot on a miner's lamp enflamed Proper sinister a lioness Armed Or resting the interior foot on a closed book Azure edged Or.

Orders of precedence in the United Kingdom
Preceded by The Lord Blencathra	Gentlemen; Baron Singh of Wimbledon	Followed by The Lord Curry of Kirkharle
