= The Glove Collection =

Collection of gloves, housed in Bath, England

The Glove Collection is a collection of approximately 2,300 historic and contemporary gloves. It is associated with the Worshipful Company of Glovers and normally some of the gloves are on display in the Fashion Museum, Bath. The collection took on its present form in 2003 when the Glovers Livery Company donated their collection of approximately 250 gloves to The Glove Collection Trust, which manages the collection.

== History ==
The Worshipful Company of Glovers donated their collection of historic gloves, including a notable set owned by Robert Spence (1871–1964), to the Glove Collection Trust in 2003, forming the Glove Collection. The donated gloves included a duplicate of the coronation gloves of Queen Victoria and subsequent monarchs.

Since the donation, the Glove Collection has grown substantially and now has over 2,000 British and European gloves.

Since 1985, the gloves have been on long-term loan to the Fashion Museum, Bath, and since 2019, all of the gloves have been stored in the Assembly Rooms.

== See also ==
- Fashion Museum, Bath
- Worshipful Company of Glovers
- Worshipful Company of Broderers
- Worshipful Company of Gold and Silver Wyre Drawers
