= Coronation glove =

British monarch's ceremonial glove

The coronation glove is a single white glove worn on the right hand by the British monarch during part of their coronation. It is donned after they are invested with the Sovereign's Ring and remains in place during the crowning ceremony. The glove is removed prior to the taking of homage from the bishops and peers of the realm. Presenting the glove to the monarch was a right associated with the Manor of Worksop and in the past the gloves have been embroidered with the arms of the owner of that manor. In 1953 the Court of Claims ruled that the Henry Pelham-Clinton-Hope, 9th Duke of Newcastle had lost the right by passing the manor to a limited company. At the 1953 coronation the glove, now embroidered with the royal cypher, was presented to the monarch by the Chancellor of the Duchy of Lancaster.

== Use ==
The glove has been part of the coronation ceremony since that of Richard II in 1377. A single white glove is worn on the right hand only. It is presented and worn after the monarch puts on the Sovereign's Ring, symbolising a marriage-like commitment to the kingdom. The gloved hand holds the Sceptre with Cross during the crowning. The glove remains in place while the monarch moves to the throne, to receive the homage from bishops and peers of the realm. The glove is removed before the first homage, that of the Archbishop of Canterbury, is paid. The clergyman and historian Thomas Fuller, writing in 1655, stated that the white colour of the glove is a symbol of purity and integrity and intended to recall the virtues of Anglo-Saxon king Edward the Confessor.

== Elizabeth I ==
The glove worn by Elizabeth I at her 1559 coronation survives and has been exhibited at the Fashion Museum in Bath, Somerset. The glove is white with gold embroidery and gold fringe on the sleeve. In common with other gloves of this period, the Elizabeth I coronation glove has prominent stitching where the fingers join, continuing along the back of the hand in what may be the inspiration for modern fourchette detail on the back of gloves.

== Victoria ==
The glove worn by Queen Victoria at her 1838 coronation was made of kid leather and in the form of a gauntlet measuring 35 centimetres (14 in) in length. On the part of the glove covering the back of the hand the arms of the Howard family were embroidered in red and blue silk with gold detail. The head of the Howard family, the Duke of Norfolk, held the Manor of Worksop which claims the ancient right to present the coronation glove to the monarch (this practice dates back at least to the Coronation of James II and VII and Mary). The Duke of Norfolk also hold the hereditary office of Earl Marshal, among whose duties is to organise the coronation. The gloves depict, behind the arms, the batons associated with the office of Earl Marshal. The arms are surrounded by lettering spelling out "Honi soit qui mal y pense," the motto of the Order of the Garter. The sleeve of the gauntlet is decorated with gold embroidery, edged with purple silk satin and a gold tassel. A replica of the glove, made in the 1870s, is in the collection of the Glove Collection Trust, a charity associated with the Worshipful Company of Glovers and is on long term loan to the Fashion Museum. The glove's maker is not known.

== Edward VII ==
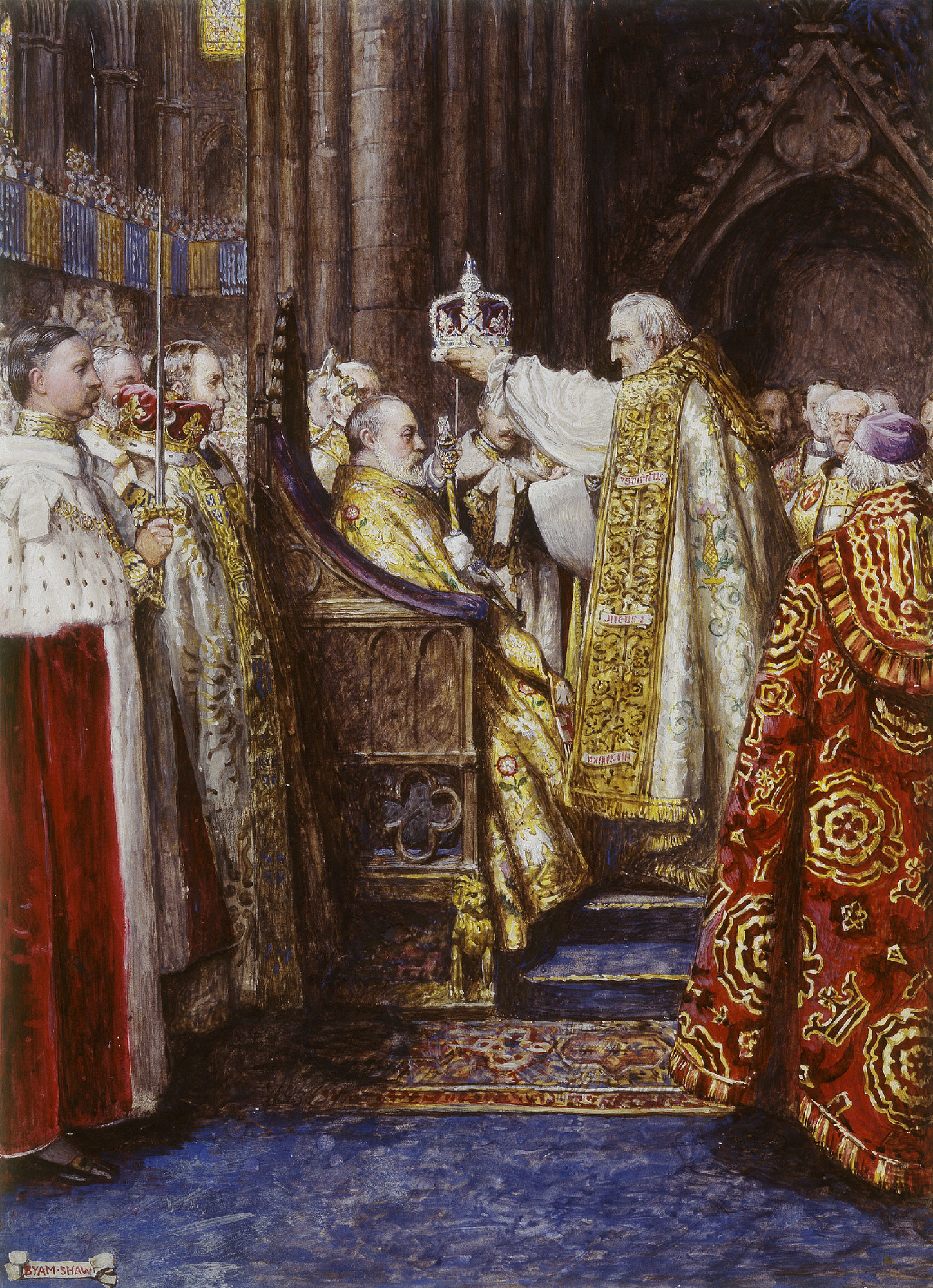
The crowning of Edward VII, the glove can be seen on his right hand

The glove worn by Edward VII for his 1902 coronation was again in white kid leather and measured 36.5 centimetres (14.4 in) in length. The back of the glove now showed the arms of the Duke of Newcastle who had purchased the Manor of Worksop shortly after Victoria's coronation. The embroidery, in red, white and blue silks and gold metal thread, also depicted a crown. The sleeve of the gauntlet had a design of acanthus, vines and lilies embroidered in gold thread. A duplicate, made by the firm Messrs Harborow, is held by the Glove Collection Trust.

== George V ==
The glove worn by George V at his 1911 coronation was again in white kid leather and measured 36.5 centimetres (14.4 in) in length. The back again shows the arms of the Duke of Newcastle and a crown embroidered in red, white and blue silk and gold metal thread. The sleeve is decorated with roses, shamrocks, thistles and acorns embroidered in gold thread. A duplicate is held by the Glove Collection Trust, again made by Messrs Harborow.

== George VI ==
The glove worn by George VI at his 1937 coronation was once more made of white kid leather and measures 39 centimetres (15 in) in length. Similar to the glove of George V the back featured the arms of the Duke of Newcastle and a crown embroidered in red, white and blue silk and gold metal thread. The sleeve was again decorated with roses, shamrocks, thistles and acorns embroidered with gold thread. A duplicate is held by the Glove Collection Trust. The glove was made by Dents with the embroidery by Edward Stillwell and Company.

== Elizabeth II ==
For the 1953 coronation, Henry Pelham-Clinton-Hope, 9th Duke of Newcastle petitioned the Court of Claims for the Manor of Worksop's traditional right of presenting the coronation glove. The claim was denied as the duke had placed his estates into a limited company and the court determined for that coronation to not award any rights to limited companies. The glove was instead provided by the Worshipful Company of Glovers and presented to the queen on coronation day by Frederick Marquis, Baron Woolton, the Chancellor of the Duchy of Lancaster.

The glove was made by Dents and once again was of white kid leather, sourced from Pittards, and measured 34 centimetres (13 in) in length. The embroidery on the back of the glove featured no coat of arms, only Elizabeth's royal cypher and a crown in gold and red velvet. The sleeve was decorated with roses, acorns and shamrocks embroidered in gold wire, metal strips and sequin. Two gloves were made in case of mishap, with Dents retaining the spare which was also worn by Elizabeth to check sizing. The original is in the collection of the Glove Collection Trust and on long term loan to the Fashion Museum.

== Charles III ==
For his coronation, Charles III used the glove made for his grandfather George VI. Lord Singh of Wimbledon represented the Sikh faith and presented the Coronation Glove.
