= Worshipful Company of Glovers =

Livery company of the City of London

- The Glovers' Company Coat of Arms
- Motto: True Hearts and Warm Hands
- Location: City of London
- Date of formation: 1349; 677 years ago
- Company association: Glove Trade
- Order of precedence: 62nd
- Master of company: Jonathan Grosvenor, November 2026 - November 2027
- Website: www.thegloverscompany.org

The Worshipful Company of Glovers is one of the ancient Livery Companies of the City of London. Glovers separated from the Cordwainers to form their own organisation in 1349 and received a Royal Charter of incorporation in 1639. The company is, as are most other Livery Companies, a charitable organisation, but it still retains close links to its original trade.

The Company ranks 62nd in the order of precedence of Livery Companies. They are a member of the 'Leathery Group' of Livery Companies, along with the Leathersellers, Coachmakers & Coach Harness Makers, Cordwainers, Curriers, Girdlers, Loriners, Saddlers, and Pattenmakers.

The company's motto is True Hearts and Warm Hands.

== History ==
Glovers, along with Girdlers were originally classified as Cordwainers, but separated to form their own 'mistery' (trade or craft) organisation in 1349 when the bye-laws were recorded by the City Authorities. Five years later, the articles and ordinances of a separate faith-focussed 'Fraternity of the Craft of Glovers' were recorded before the Commissary of London (an ecclesiastical official appointed by the Bishop of London).

By the end of the 15th century, the traders and merchants in London were in general prospering much more than the makers of things, and hence wealth and influence accrued much more to the mercantile companies than the crafts. Following a decline in numbers beyond the point of sustainability, the Glovers first merged with the Pursers (another small leathercraft company) in 1498 and then the much larger Leathersellers in 1502.

Gloves became a high fashion item during the Elizabethan period and hence the glove trade grew in importance and influence. After much internal dispute and protracted efforts to separate from the Leathersellers, the Glovers became independent again under a Royal Charter of incorporation from King Charles I in 1638, followed by having their ordinances accepted by the Court of Aldermen in 1644 and finally having their status confirmed as a livery company in 1680 (after delays caused by the English Civil War amongst other things).

Royal links are still maintained; for example, the Company presented Princess Elizabeth with 30 pairs of gloves in a casket on the occasion of her marriage. The company has previously formally presented the Sovereign with a glove upon his or her coronation, however King Charles lll used the glove presented to his grandfather King George Vl by the Company in 1937.

In the 17th century the focus of the company was very much on the control and governance of the trade, in particular the 'search' (inspection) of tawed leather (a process also known as alum tanning, that is still used for gloves and cricket balls) to ensure the quality of raw materials, and that those making gloves in London should have served an approved apprenticeship in the trade.

In the 18th century the Glovers produced three Lord Mayors: John Barnard (1737; he translated to the more prestigious Grocers Company just prior to becoming Lord Mayor), John Burnell (1787, the oldest Lord Mayor ever), and Sir John Anderson (1797). By the late 18th century the glove trade in London had declined and become a free for all, and the company had lost almost all connection with the trade. Between 1773 and 1804 only three of the members were described as glovers, and the professions of the masters from 1770 to 1780 were linen draper, oylman, tobacconist, sugar maker, jeweller and wine merchant.

The Company nearly became extinct for a second time in the late 19th century, with the low point being 1880 to 1885 when George Hibbert appears to have been the sole member of the court and re-elected himself as Master each year. Many livery companies were struggling to survive at this time (and several did not), as they were widely perceived to be an anachronism serving no useful function, divorced from the real commerce of the country. The appointment of Sir Homewood Crawford (Solicitor to the Corporation of London) as Master in 1886 started a turnaround in the Company's fortunes (as it did at the Fan makers), with the assistance of Benjamin Scott (City Chamberlain). He was able to obtain an inspeximus granted by Queen Victoria in 1898, confirming the original Stuart charter.

Little is known of the company in the first half of the 20th century because all of the records were destroyed in an air raid in 1941. By the 1950s it was clear that reform was needed, as the Court met four times per year but there were no other meetings of any kind so the ordinary members had minimal knowledge of and no involvement in the Company. Significant changes started from 1970, with growing glove trade involvement, charitable projects, historical education, participation in City events, social activity, production of a newsletter, and rotation of the roles on the Court. Ladies were admitted from 1979 and the first female Master took office in 1999.

The hall was acquired in the mid 17th Century and was sited near Beech Lane in the area now covered by the Barbican Centre, but was increasingly used for religious purposes in the 18th century, including by the Wesleyans for at least 1739 to 1762. It was disposed of in the late 18th century when the company was in financial difficulties and were transacting their business at the George and Vulture Tavern, Lombard Street.

The coat of arms was first granted in 1464, and the supporters were added in 1986. The arms are "on a field of six pieces Sable and Argent three Rams salient armed and unguled Or" and feature sheep, which provided much of the raw material for gloves. The supporters are a male apprentice of the Glovers' Company, and a Sempster (a sewing woman) dressed circa 1638.

== Charitable Giving ==
The Charity Projects Committee (CPC) administers the Glovers' charitable donations. Around 50 charities are supported, the largest group of which are homeless charities and hospices who receive gloves for warmth, clinical needs and catering purposes. Other glove donations include gardening gloves to help with mental and physical therapy, cryotherapy mittens for patients undergoing chemotherapy treatment at Portsmouth Hospital and protective gloves for charity led emergency services such as London's Air Ambulance. The CPC offers student bursaries and grants to selected schools and colleges and supports community projects in areas of need, including The Winch which provides after-school clubs and holiday schemes for children in Campden. A significant recent initiative is the provision of myoelectric prosthetic hands from Open Bionics and prosthetic sleeves from Koalaa for children and adults who would not otherwise be able to access them.

== The Glove Collection Trust ==
The Trust was established in 1993 as a charity to "advance public education in the historical, social, and artistic value of gloves". In 2003 the Company gifted its collection of about 250 items to the Trust. The core of this was the collection of mainly 17th and 18th century gloves bequeathed to the company by the artist Robert Spence in 1964. The trustees have subsequently expanded the Glove Collection to approximately 2,300 items that can be viewed on the Trust's dedicated website. A prominent contributor to this expansion was Past Assistant Douglas Sweet, who spent 30 years making acquisitions. The Trust published an illustrated booklet containing twenty notable gloves to commemorate his work. The collection is now held in the care of the Fashion Museum, Bath. The Trust periodically lends items for display at other museums, UK and overseas.

== Glove Trade Activity ==
In the first half of the 20th Century the Company had little connection with the glove trade, so other trade associations were formed: The National Association of Glove Manufacturers in 1941, and the Glove Guild of Great Britain (representing importers wholesalers and retailers) in 1965. However, the early 1980s recession and the rise in far eastern imports caused the bulk of the membership of both organisations to cease trading, and the Company facilitated a merger in 1998 to form the British Glove Association (BGA), with the Immediate Past Master Michael Down as the First President, Past Master Roderick Morriss as the second, and Past Master John Spanner as the third (and last). The number of gloves made in the UK continued to reduce in the 2000s, and at the AGM in 2010 it was agreed that the BGA would be dissolved, with the Company inheriting the small remaining funds and the Glove Trade Committee some of the activities such as lobbying on behalf of the industry, and the student glove design competition which continues to this day.

Whilst traditional glove making has largely moved offshore there are still specialist UK companies engaged in the design, development, importation and distribution of technical, military, medical and industrial gloves as well as fashion companies making or distributing dress gloves in the UK and for export markets. The Company maintains links with glove makers and importers including Dents (fashion gloves), Southcombe Gloves (fashion, technical and sports gloves), Bennett Safetywear (safety gloves), BM Polyco (rubber and PVC gloves).

The Glovers run an annual "Golden Glove Award for Innovation". This was won in 2022 by the British Equestrian Federation. Student glove design and safety poster design competitions are also run annually to encourage practical and innovative glove design, and an awareness of hand protection in an industrial environment. The 2024 student glove design competition had two categories: a Glasto Glove (for any music artist who has ever played at Glastonbury, won by embroidery student Amelia Legg from the Royal School of Needlework, inspired by Lady Gaga), or an Aesthetic Prosthetic (a prosthetic hand design that reworks function and form to a new artistic level, won by Yevheniia Mizevych from the London College of Fashion). The competitions are sponsored by The Company and the winners in all categories receive cash prizes, which are presented at a formal luncheon in a City of London Livery Hall. In July 2024 the awards were presented by Dame Zandra Rhodes at Drapers Hall.

== Social and City Activity ==
In common with most Livery Companies, The Glovers have an active programme of social activities of various types, including:

- Events to support and celebrate the various charities they sponsor, including visits to charities and fundraisers such as the 'Mistress Glover's Flying Circus' in 2024 which involved 15 people from 6 livery companies wing walking and raised over £50,000 to fund prosthetic hands.
- Inter-livery sporting and ceremonial events, including croquet (which the Glovers organise), golf, clay target shooting, cart marking (organised by the Carmen at Guildhall Yard which the Glovers provide protective gloves for), skiing, and a pancake race.
- Formal lunches and dinners, often linked to some other purpose such as the election of the Lord Mayor or the Sheriffs, the installation of a new Master, or the presentation of glove design awards.
- Participation in the Lord Mayor's Show.
- Presenting gloves to new appointees to high profile positions (typically top City and military officials including in 2023 the Lord Mayor and Mayoress, the Aldermanic Sheriffs, the Lord Chief Justice, the Chief of the Defence Staff, the First Sea Lord, and the Chief of the Air Staff)
- Visits to affiliated organisations.
- Visits related to the interests of the current Master, including an annual cultural 'weekend' trip outside London (now held during the week - Stratford in 2023 and Windsor in 2024).

== Affiliations ==
The Worshipful Company of Glovers, like many other Livery Companies, has forged links with units of the Armed Forces. Specifically:

- THE ARTISTS RIFLES - The connection was formed in 1955 when the then Commanding Officer was a member of the company. The Artists have provided a small Guard of Honour at the Glovers' annual dinner.
- HMS ARTFUL - The Company became affiliated to HMS Cumberland in 1999 but this frigate was decommissioned in 2011. Since then, it has been affiliated to a new nuclear powered Astute class submarine, HMS Artful, which was fitted out at Barrow in Furness and officially named in September 2013 at a ceremony attended by several Glovers. This affiliation is shared with The Worshipful Company of Glass Sellers and with the City of Southampton.
- 296 (STOKE NEWINGTON) SQUADRON ROYAL AIR FORCE AIR CADETS - The Glovers were affiliated to 444 (Shoreditch) Squadron Royal Air Force cadets who were disbanded in 2021.The Glovers then became affiliated to this Cadet Squadron on 2 February 2022. The cadets of 296 had previously formed a carpet guard at the Glovers annual Banquet in 2021 and assisted on the Glovers float at the Lord Mayors show in the same year.

The company also has two non-military affiliations:

- ST JOHN AMBULANCE 467 BARNET CADETS - The Company became affiliated to this Cadet Association in 2014.
- SAFRAN GUILD OF BASEL - their historic hall features a stained glass window of the Glovers coat of arms to mark the long association.

== Honorary Glovers ==
A recent initiative is the admission of Honorary Glovers, a position offered to individuals who have made a significant contribution to the Company in pursuit of its aims and aspirations. The first of these was Charlotte Hannibal in 2018, who educated the Company about meningitis and the need for prosthetics, and then supported fundraising for the first prosthetic hand given by the Company.
