= Central Gurdwara (Khalsa Jatha) London =

Gurdwara in Kensington, London

Coordinates: 51.5066°N 0.2158°W

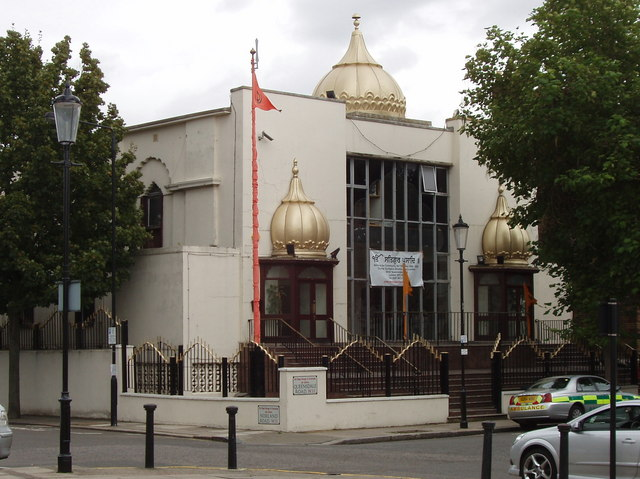
The Central Gurdwara

The Khalsa Jatha British Isles is a Sikh place of worship in the Holland Park area of London. The gurdwara was established in 1908, and affiliated to Chief Khalsa Dewan of Amritsar. From 1913 to 1969 congregations were held at 79 Sinclair Road, West Kensington. The present building was established in 1969 onwards at Queensdale Road. The building was later refurbished by Virdee Foundation.

The Gurdwara is the oldest in both the United Kingdom and the continent of Europe. It maintains tradition practices of the Khalsa such as hoisting a Nishan Sahib (Sikh flag) with the original symbol of the Khalsa instead of a modern Khanda - it also maintains relations with the Nihang Dal, the oldest and most established order of Sikhism. Budha Dal, the most mainstream Nihang faction, are enlisted by the Gurdwara to conduct its Amrit Sanchars (the Sikh initiation ceremony).
