= Aston Martin DBS Superleggera =

British grand touring car

Aston Martin DBS
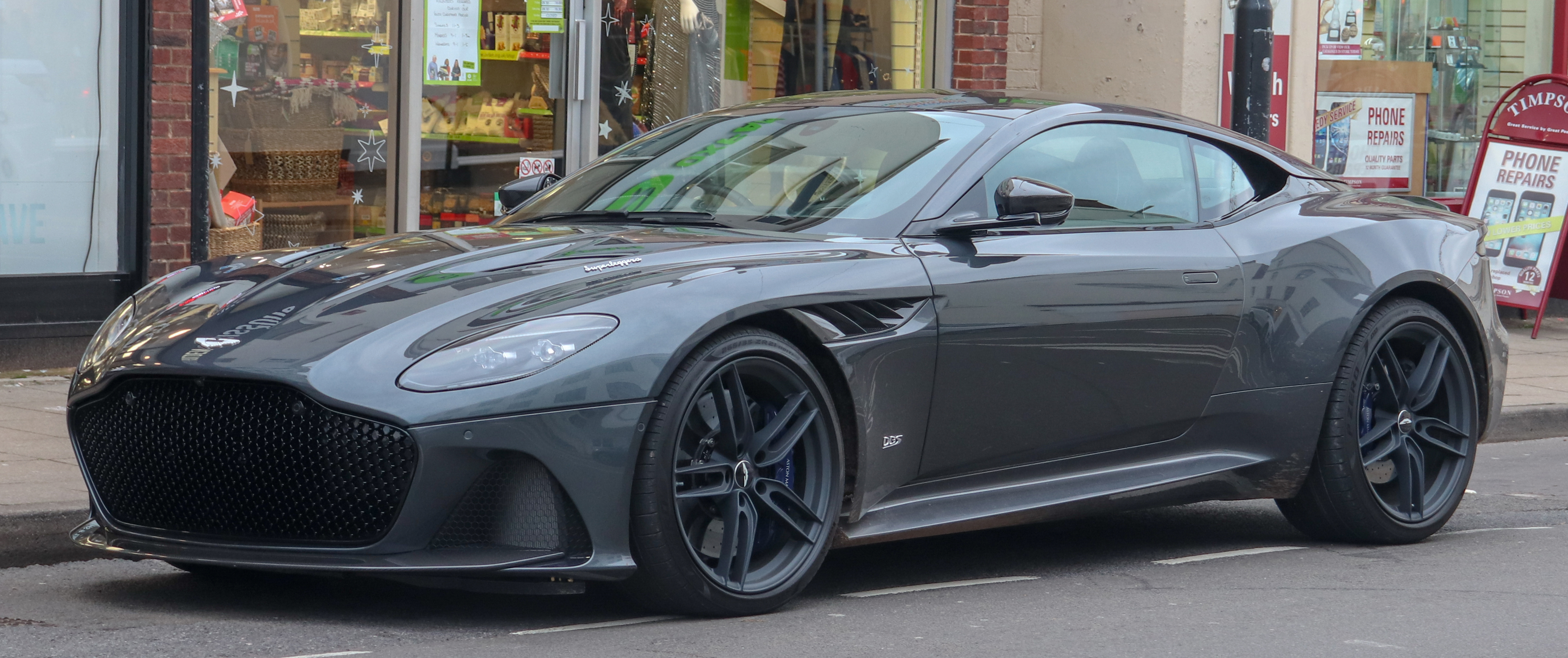

Overview
- Manufacturer: Aston Martin
- Model code: AM7
- Production: 2018–2024
- Assembly: United Kingdom: Gaydon, Warwickshire
- Designer: Marek Reichman

Body and chassis
- Class: Grand tourer (S)
- Body style: 2-door coupé; 2-door convertible
- Layout: Front mid-engine, rear-wheel-drive
- Doors: Swan
- Related: Aston Martin DB11; Aston Martin Vantage (2018)

Powertrain
- Engine: 5.2 L AE31 twin-turbo V12
- Power output: 725 PS (533 kW; 715 hp) (DBS); 770 PS (566 kW; 759 hp) (DBS 770 Ultimate)
- Transmission: 8-speed ZF 8HP95 automatic

Dimensions
- Wheelbase: 2,805 mm (110.4 in)
- Length: 4,715 mm (185.6 in)
- Width: 2,145 mm (84.4 in)
- Height: 1,280 mm (50.4 in)
- Kerb weight: 1,693 kg (3,732 lb) (Coupé) 1,863 kg (4,107 lb) (Volante)

Chronology
- Predecessor: Aston Martin Vanquish (second generation)
- Successor: Aston Martin Vanquish (third generation)

The Aston Martin DBS Superleggera, also sold as the Aston Martin DBS, is a grand touring car produced by British manufacturer Aston Martin from 2018 to 2024. In June 2018, Aston Martin unveiled the car as a replacement to the second-generation Vanquish. It is based on the DB11 V12, but featuring modifications that differentiate it from the DB11 lineage.

The DBS name was previously used for a model built from 1967 to 1972 and for the DB9-based DBS between 2007 and 2012. In addition, the car also uses the Superleggera name which is a reference to Carrozzeria Touring Superleggera, who helped Aston Martin develop their lightest grand tourers in the 1960s and 1970s. In September 2024, Aston Martin announced the third-generation Vanquish as the successor of the DBS Superleggera.

== Specifications ==
The front of the DBS features a new front bumper, with a larger centre grille compared to the DB11, for improved engine cooling, along with two air extractors on the sides to cool the brakes and two vents on the hood that aid in the engine cooling process. The 5.2-litre twin-turbocharged V12 engine, which is cast and manufactured at Grainger & Worrall in the United Kingdom before being shipped to the Aston Martin engine plant in Cologne for assembly, is rated at 725 PS (533 kW; 715 hp) at 6,500 rpm and 900 N⋅m (664 lb⋅ft) of torque from 1,800–5,000 rpm. In order to optimise the centre of gravity and weight distribution, the engine has been positioned as low and as far back in the chassis as possible.

The DBS Superleggera features the new ZF 8HP95 transmission with a shorter final-drive ratio of 2.93:1, in contrast to the DB11's 2.70:1. Chassis-wise, it also comes with torque vectoring and a mechanical limited slip differential for more focused track performance. The car also features many of the same aerodynamic features first seen on the DB11, including Aston Martin's Aeroblade system, but refines aerodynamics with an F1-inspired double-diffuser that helps the car generate 397 lb (180 kg) of downforce – the highest figure ever for a series production Aston Martin. A new quad-pipe titanium exhaust system improves engine sound, while the usage of carbon fibre in major areas of the car lowers the weight down to 1,693 kg (3,732 lb).

== Performance ==
The DBS Superleggera can accelerate from 0–100 km/h (62 mph) in 3.4 seconds, and 0–161 km/h (100 mph) in 6.4 seconds. The car can also accelerate from 80–161 km/h (50–100 mph) in 4.2 seconds at fourth gear and can attain a top speed of 340 km/h (211 mph). Three driving modes are available: GT, Sport, and Sport Plus which adjust the car's responsiveness.

== Variants ==
=== DBS 59 ===
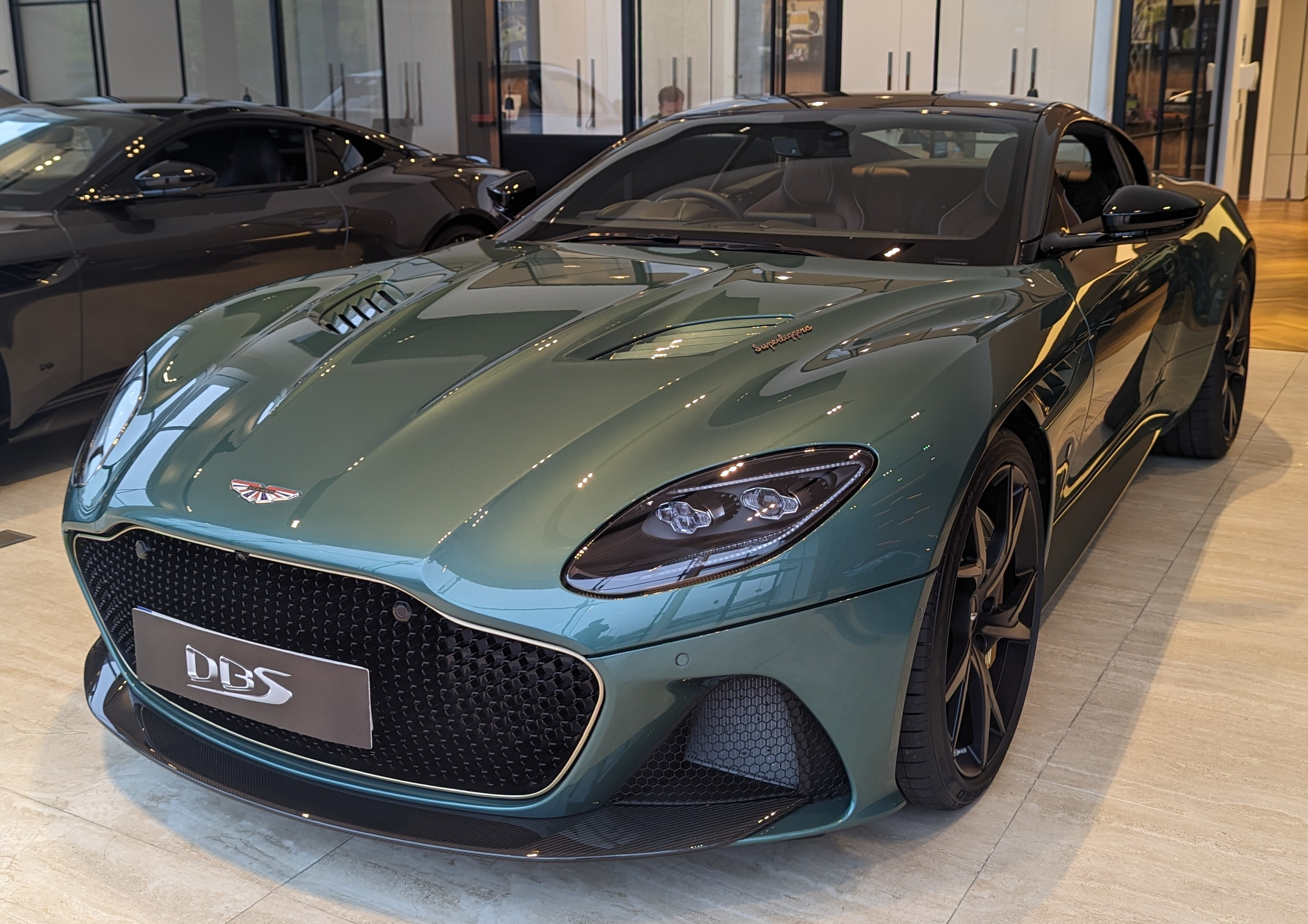
Front of 59

The Aston Martin DBS 59 was the first limited-edition version of the DBS Superleggera, created to commemorate Aston Martin's 1-2 finish at the 1959 24 Hours of Le Mans. Only 24 units were produced, each representing one hour of the race.

It features an exclusive "Aston Martin Racing Green" paint, bronze detailing on the grille, wheels, and badges, and a revised interior with Heritage Racing Seats trimmed in Obsidian Black leather and fabric inspired by the original DBR1. Each car includes period-correct racing accessories like racing gloves, period-helmet replicas, and a custom luggage set. The DBS 59 retains the 5.2-litre twin-turbo V12 engine producing 725 PS (533 kW; 715 hp).

=== DBS Volante ===
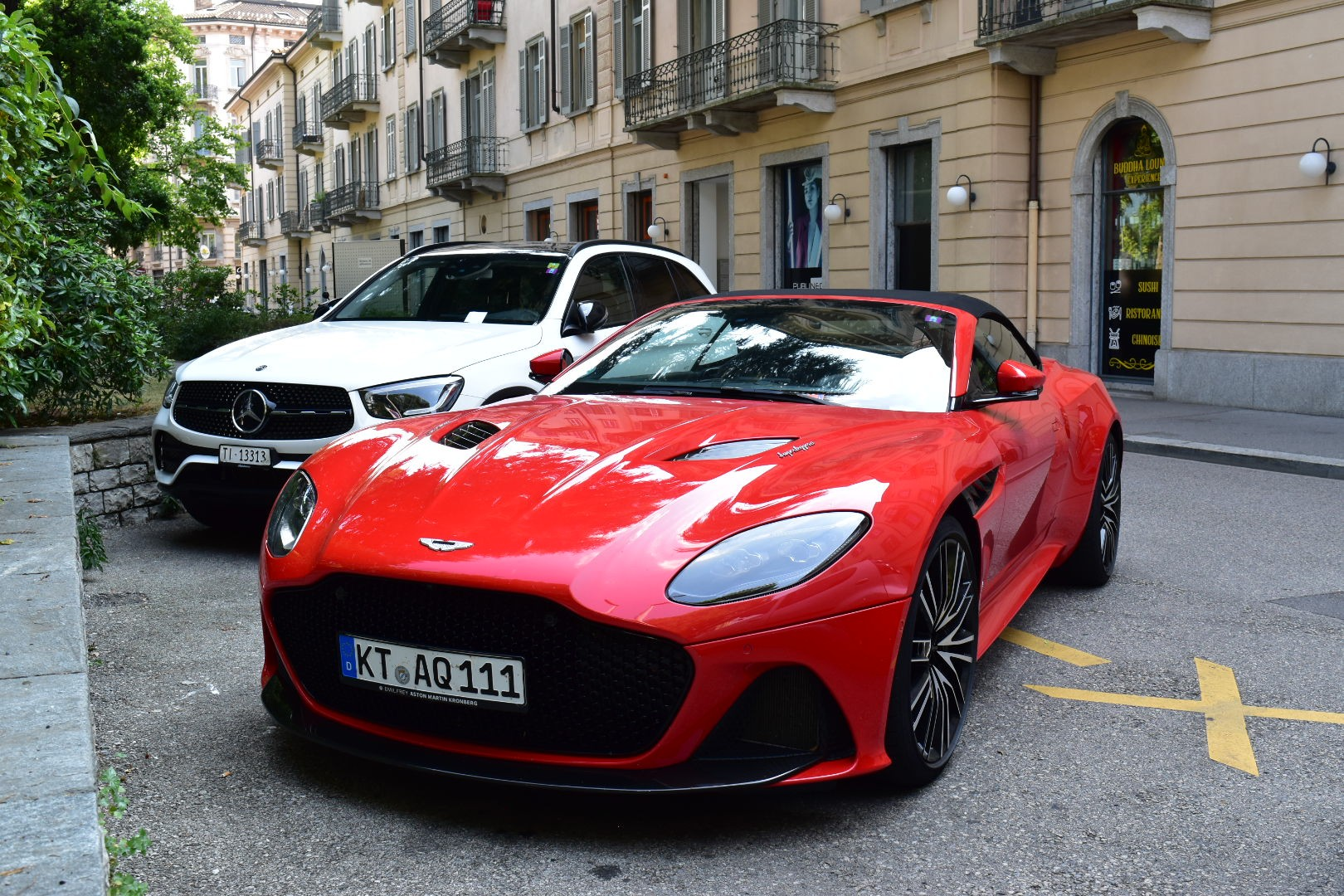
Front of Volante

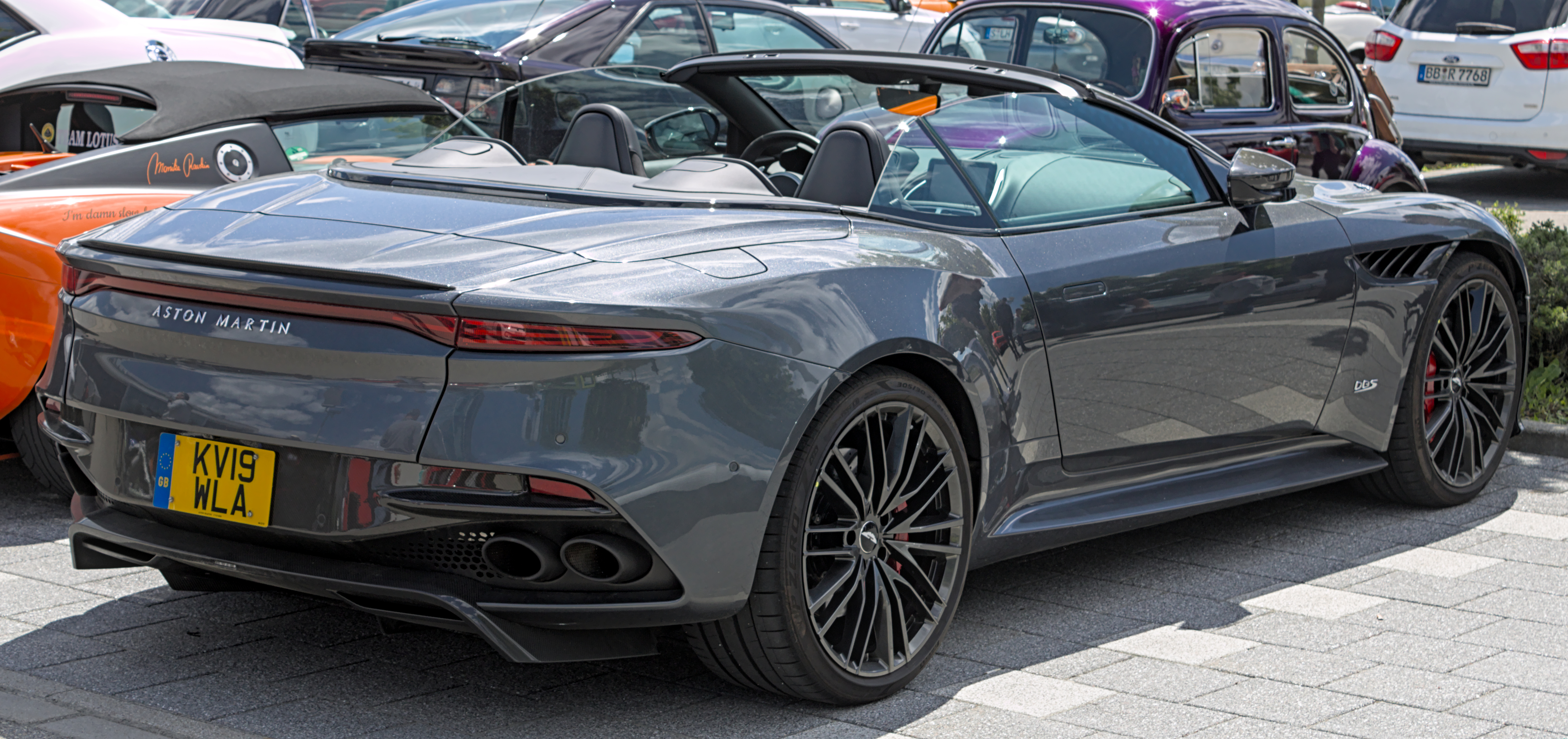
Rear of Volante

A Volante (convertible) model of the DBS was unveiled in April 2019. It has nearly identical performance and the same engine and transmission as the coupé but comes with an eight-layer soft top with eight colour options. For the first time on an Aston Martin automobile, the windshield surround is available in carbon fibre as well as the rear tonneau cover.

=== DBS Superleggera TAG Heuer Edition ===
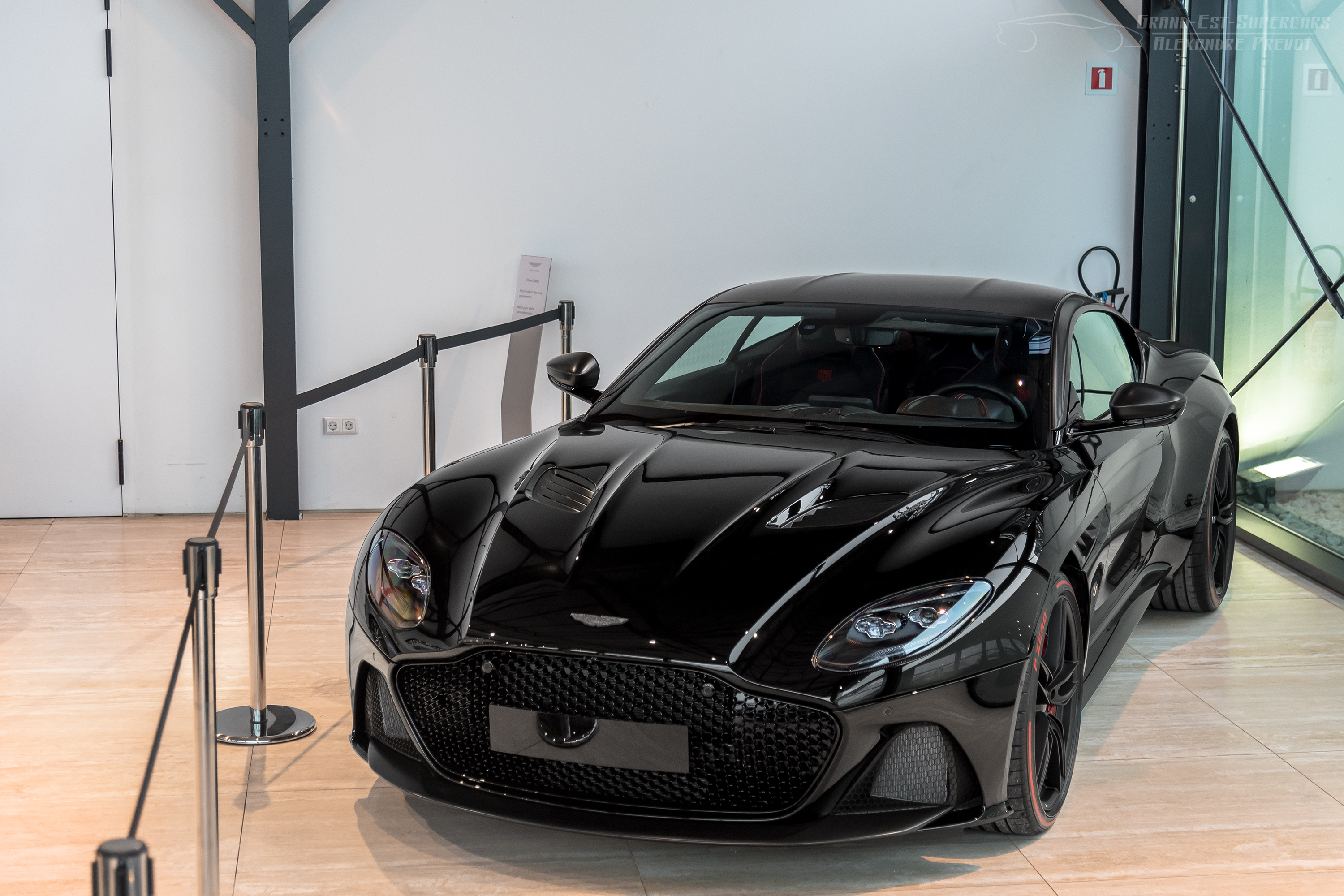
TAG Heuer Edition

In February 2019, Aston Martin unveiled a DBS Superleggera in partnership with Swiss luxury watch maker TAG Heuer. Fifty were built. The bespoke colour is Monaco Black, a metallic black paint with subtle red sparks. It came with interior and exterior carbon options and satin black 21” alloy wheels, Pirelli P Zero tyres with red stripe and red brake calipers. The interior of the car is composed of black leather and alcantara quilting with red stitching which is only available on this vehicle.

Each car came with a limited edition TAG Heuer watch, the DBS Edition Carrera Heuer 02, which was only available to the buyers of the vehicle. The dial represents the grille of the DBS and the black and red leather strap reminds the interior of the car.Only 50 units were made.

=== DBS Superleggera OHMSS ===
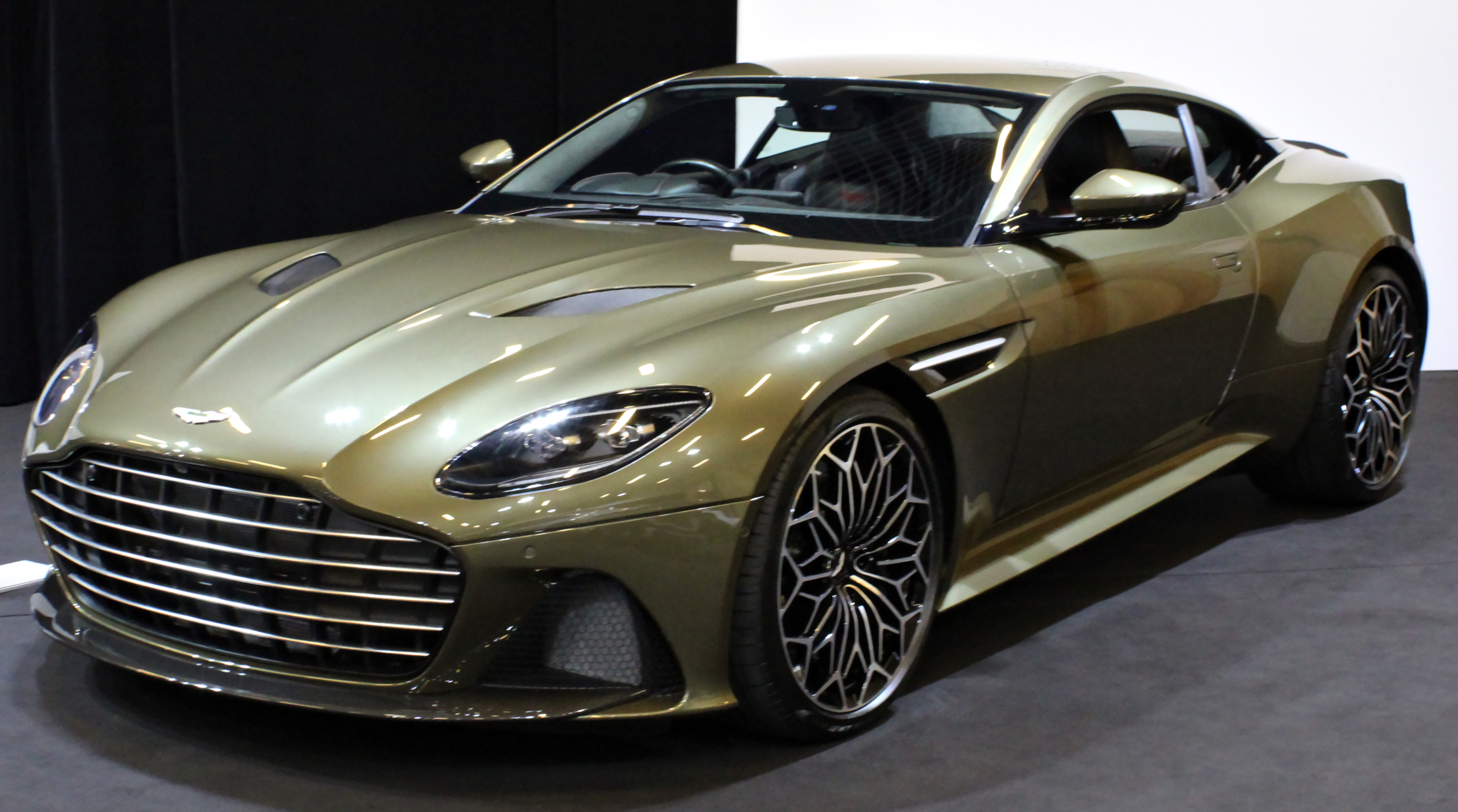
Front of OHMSS

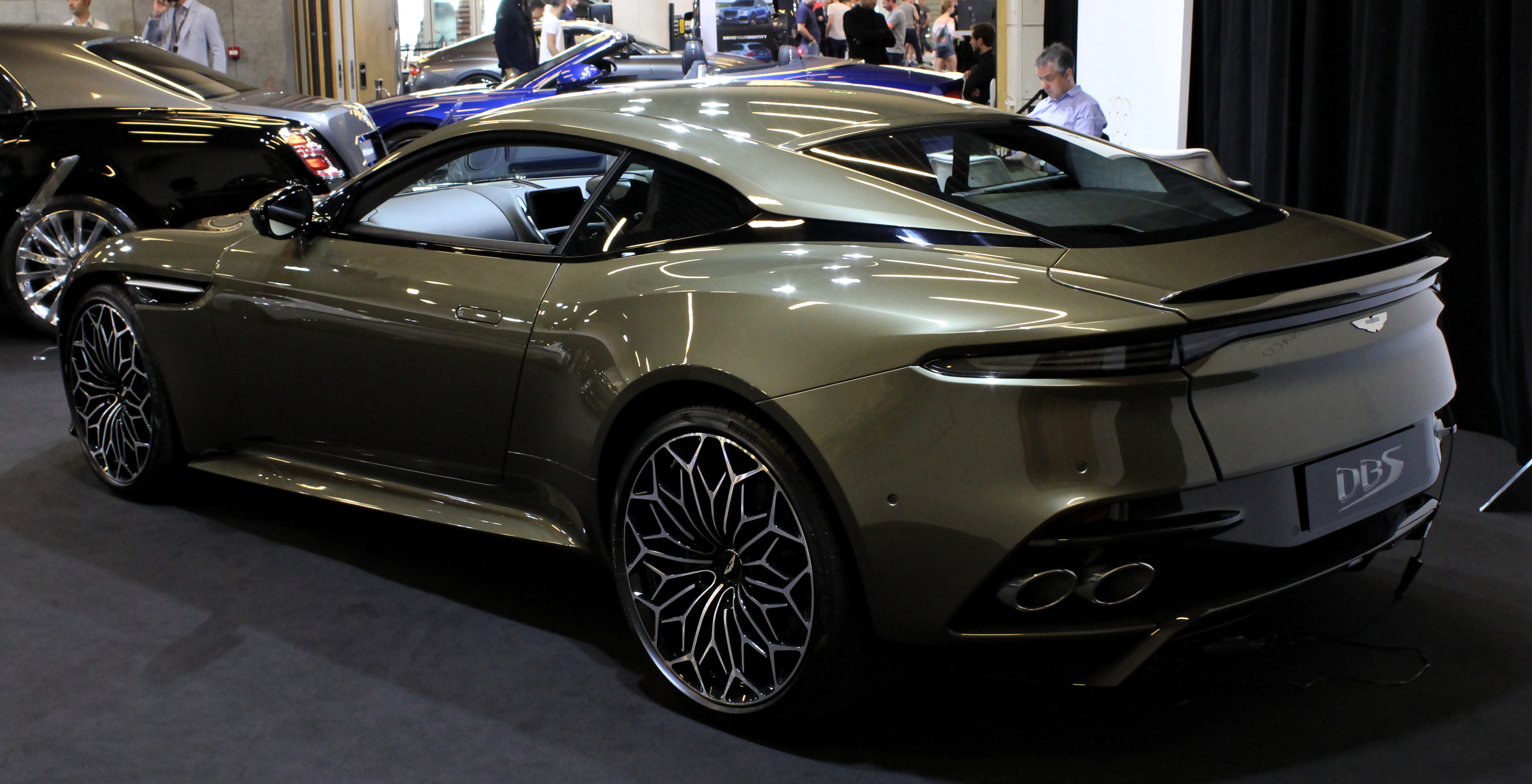
Rear of OHMSS

In May 2019, Aston Martin unveiled a DBS Superleggera to celebrate 50 years of the James Bond film On Her Majesty's Secret Service. The car followed the specification of the original DBS used in the film, with an Olive Green exterior colour and a traditional Aston Martin Grille. Only 50 units were made.

=== DBS GT Zagato ===
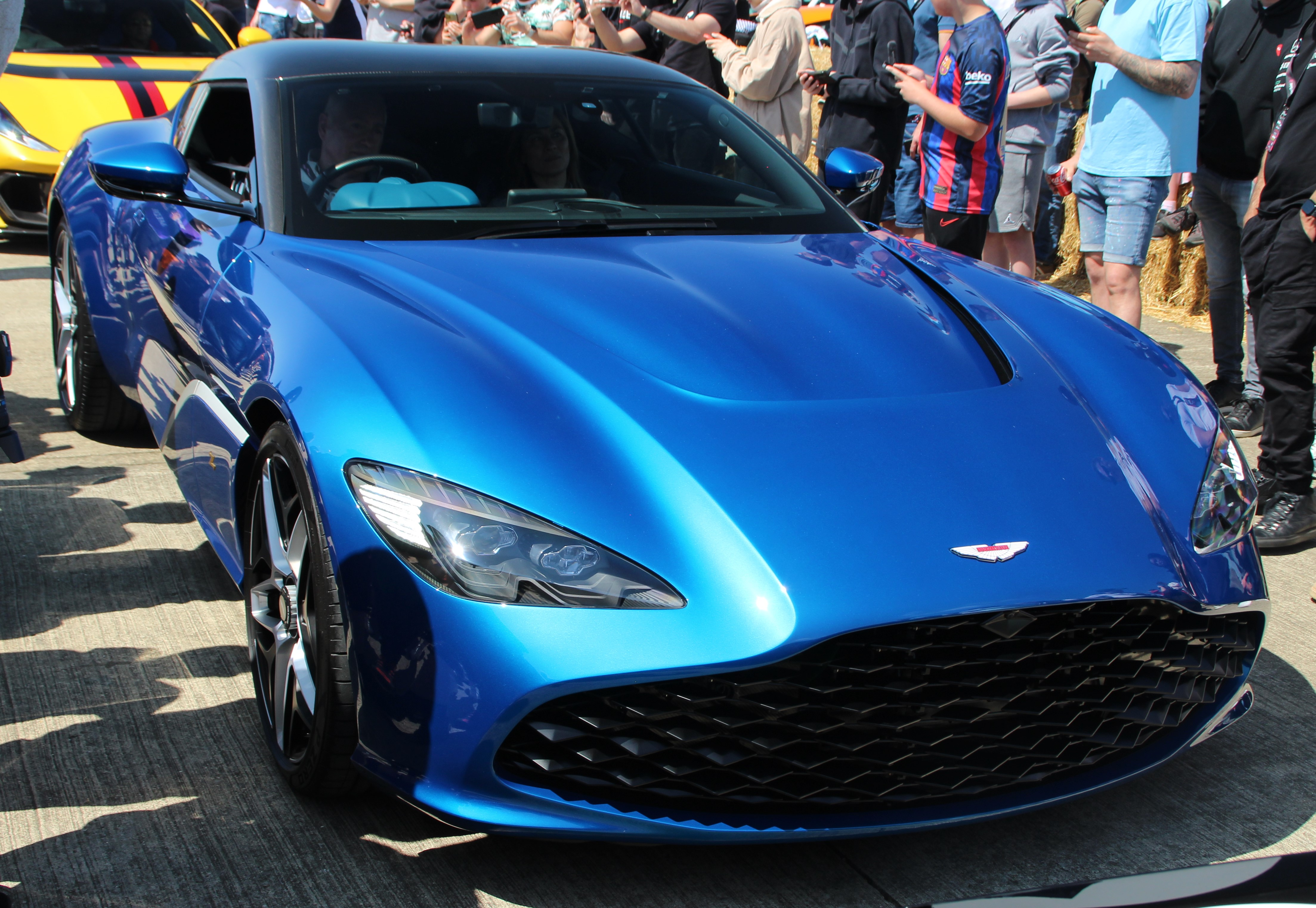
Front of Zagato

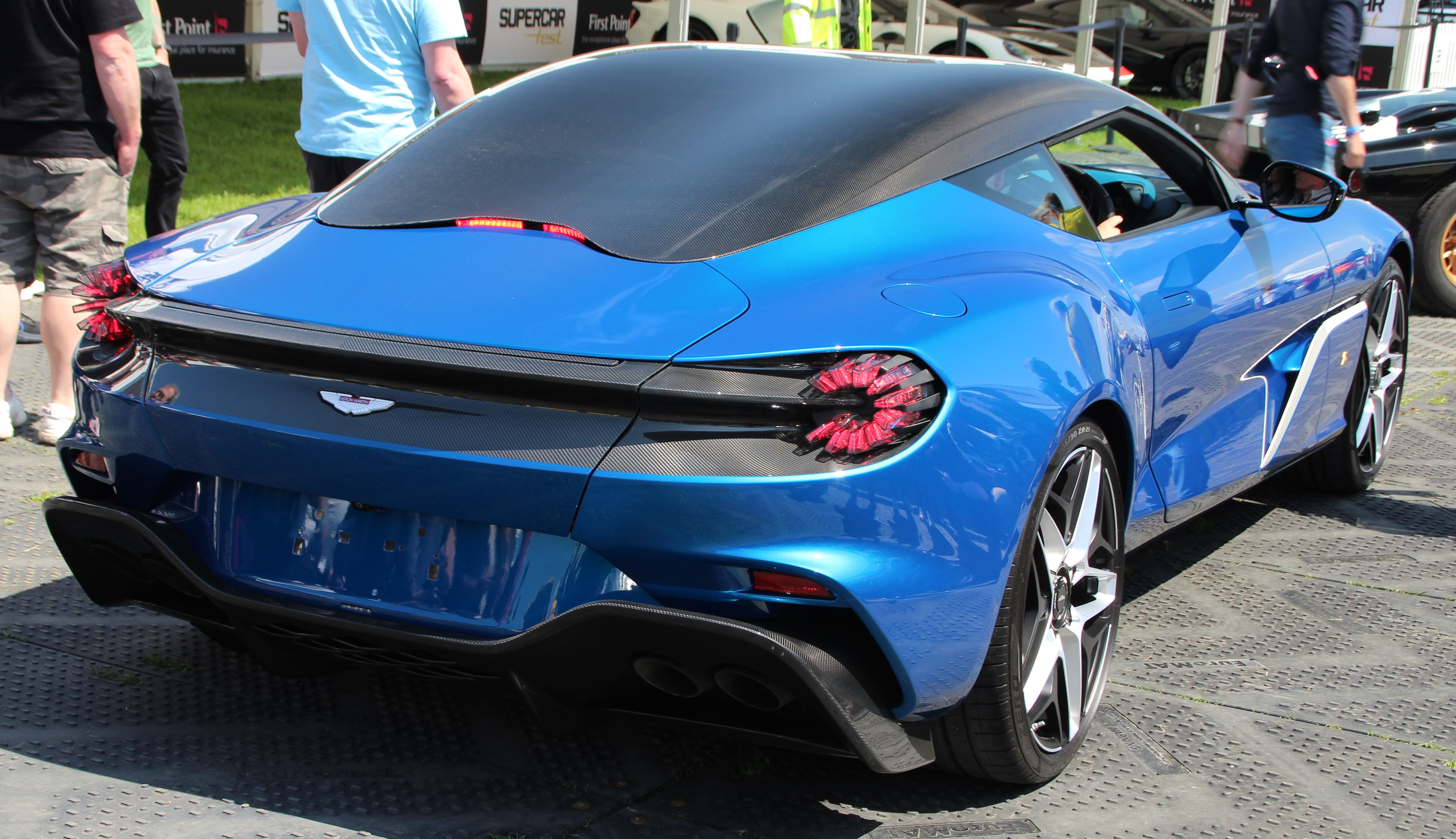
Rear of Zagato

In October 2019, Aston Martin revealed the Aston Martin DBS GT Zagato at the Audrain's Newport Concours in Rhode Island United States. The car is based on the DBS Superleggera and peak power has been raised from 715 hp to 760 hp. It can only be purchased as part of the £6 million before tax "DBZ Centenary Collection" pack which includes a DB4 GT Zagato continuation as well as a DBS GT Zagato. Only 19 "packs" were available for sale.

=== DBS Superleggera Concorde Edition ===
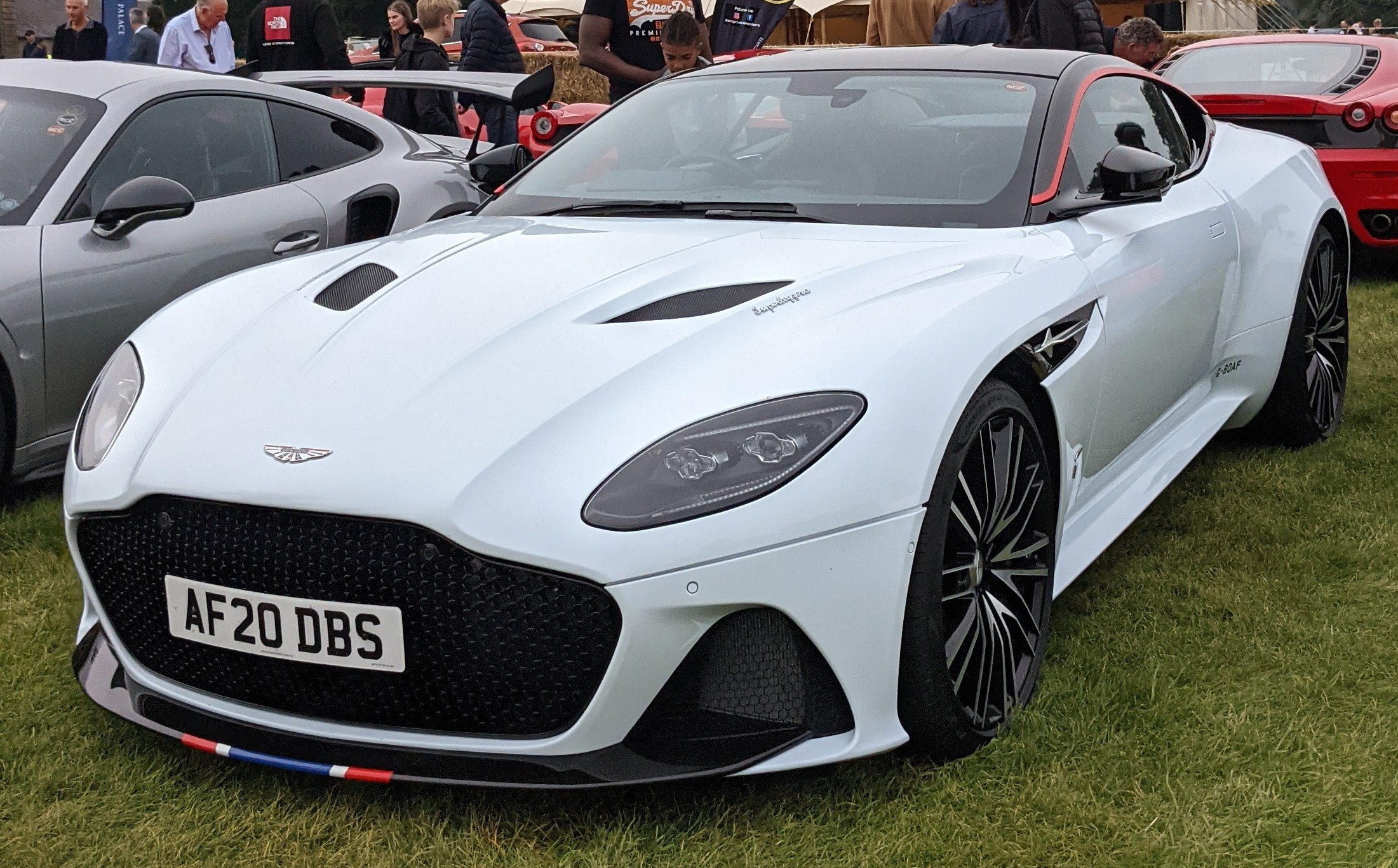
Front of Concorde

In November 2019, the Concorde Edition was unveiled to celebrate 50 years since the first flight of Concorde. This latest member of the Aston Martin Wings Series was commissioned by Aston Martin Bristol and only limited to 10 units. Each of which have a unique registration respective to the 10 Concorde aircraft flown by British Airways. This variant features many Concorde and British Airways inspired design elements on both the exterior and interior, with some parts derived from Concorde itself.

=== DBS 770 Ultimate ===
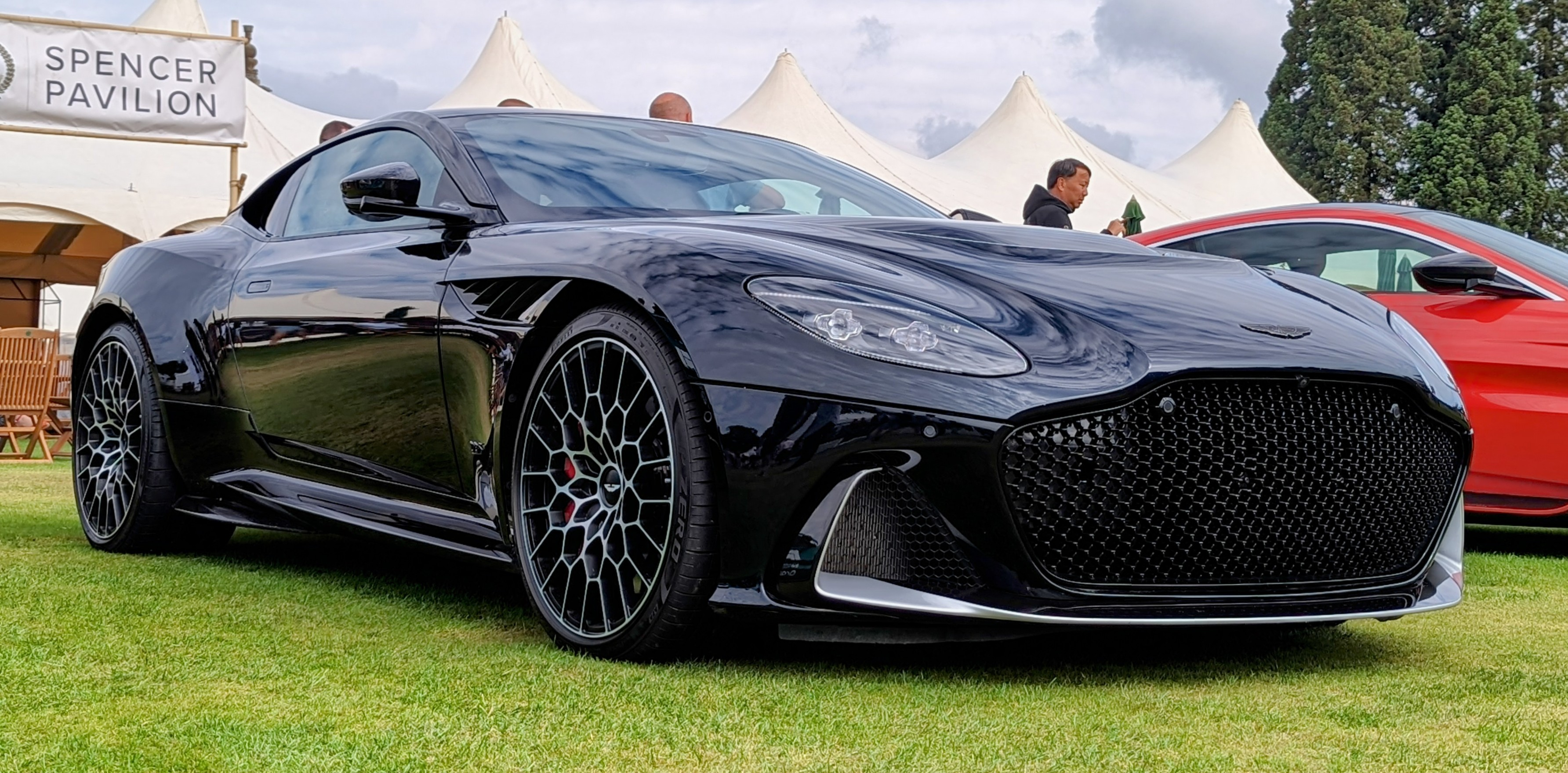
Front of 770 Ultimate

Aston Martin has revealed its send-off car for the DBS, called the 770 Ultimate. It gets 770 PS (566 kW; 759 bhp) from its 5.2-litre V12, hence the name, and benefits from a handful of visual and mechanical upgrades. Production is limited to just 499 units (300 coupés and 199 convertibles), with every build slot already sold out.

=== DBS Superleggera 007 Edition ===
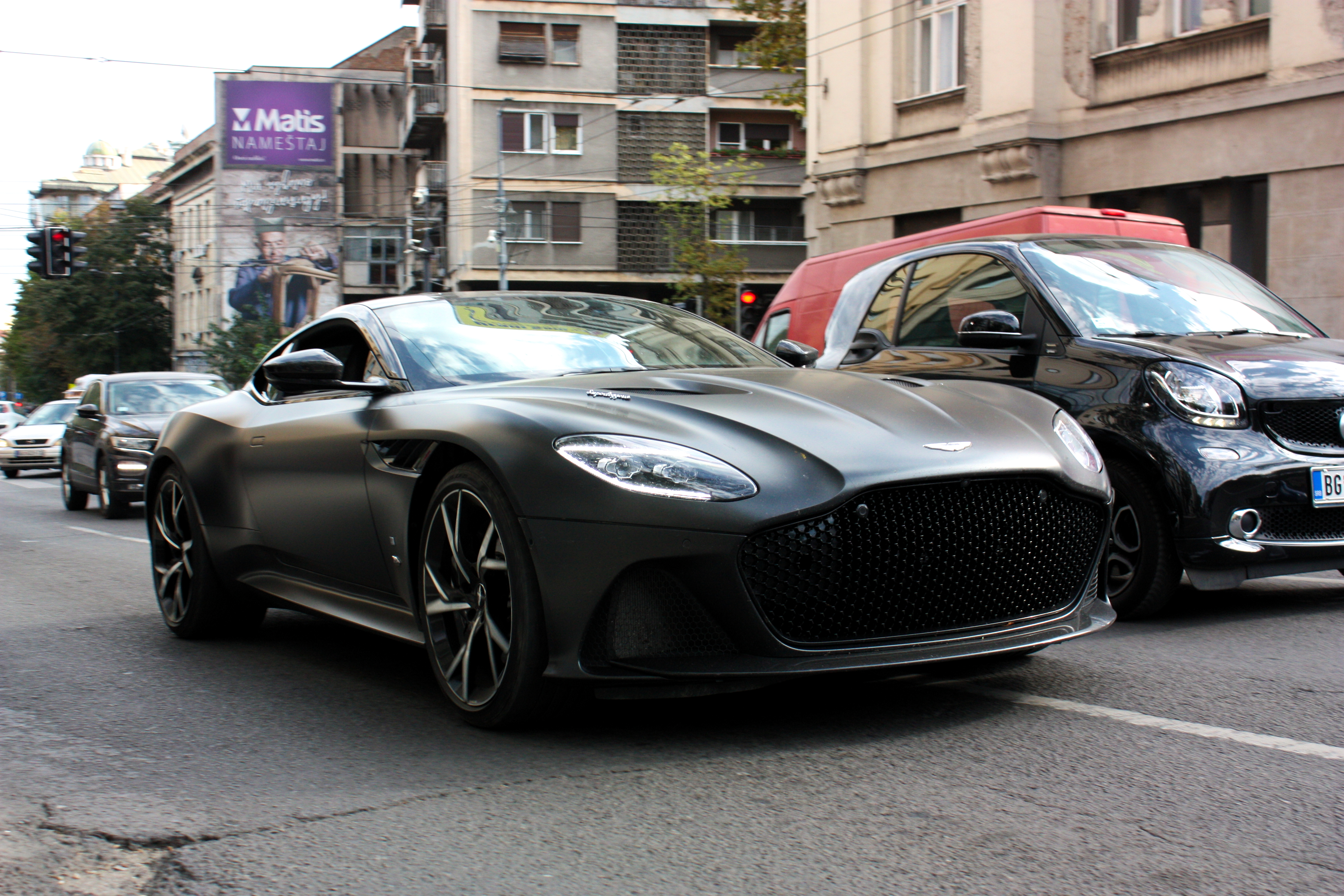
Front of DBS 007 Edition

The DBS Superleggera 007 Edition was revealed in August 2020 to honor the 25th James Bond film. The 007 Edition features Ceramic Grey exterior paint with contrasting black carbon fiber roof, mirror caps, splitter, diffuser, and rear spoiler. It also has gloss black, diamond-turned 21-inch wheels. The interior of the car is trimmed in black leather with red accents. Inside, the 007 logo is on the door panels, armrest, and subwoofer cover. Production is limited to 25 units.

=== DBS Superleggera Bijan Edition ===
The Aston Martin DBS Bijan Edition is a bespoke version of the DBS Superleggera, created in collaboration with the luxury fashion house House of Bijan. It features a unique "Bijan Yellow" exterior with a subtle paisley pattern on the hood, reflecting Bijan's signature style. The interior is finished with alligator leather upholstery, fine wood veneers, and custom details such as the owner's initials. Mechanically, it retains the standard 5.2-litre twin-turbo V12 engine, delivering 725 PS (533 kW; 715 hp) and a 0–100 km/h (62 mph) acceleration time of 3.4 seconds. Limited in production, the car was offered through Aston Martin's "Q" personalization program and represents a blend of fashion and high performance.

== Reception and marketing ==
Matt Saunders of Autocar awarded the DBS Superleggera a perfect five stars stating, "This is already an outstanding super-GT and represents a rejuvenated British car maker at its absolute best." The Sunday Times noted that the car's low ground clearance could cause it to get caught on speed bumps and that the car's high power output could make it potentially dangerous to drive in wet weather. The DBS made an appearance in the James Bond film No Time to Die.

== Gallery ==
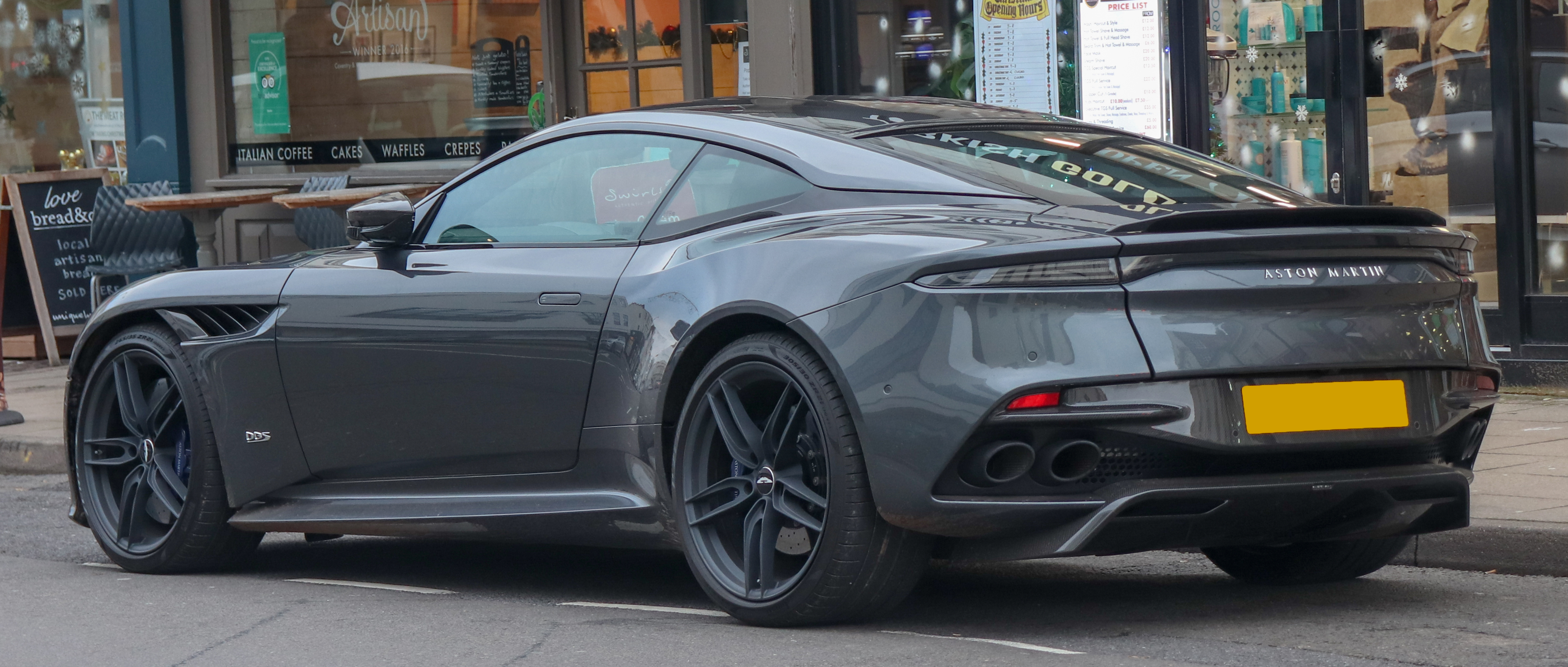
DBS Superleggera (rear view)

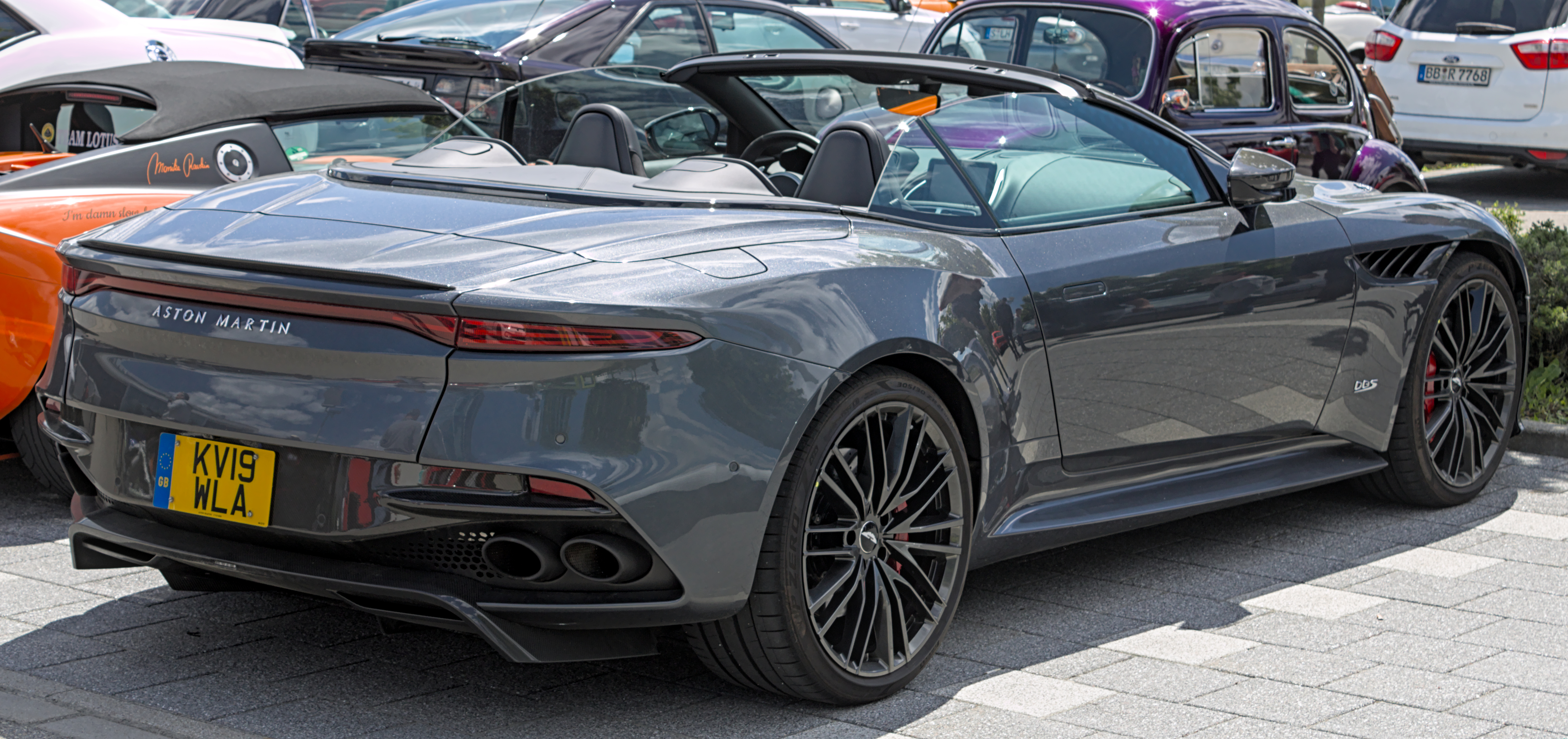
DBS Superleggera Volante with top down

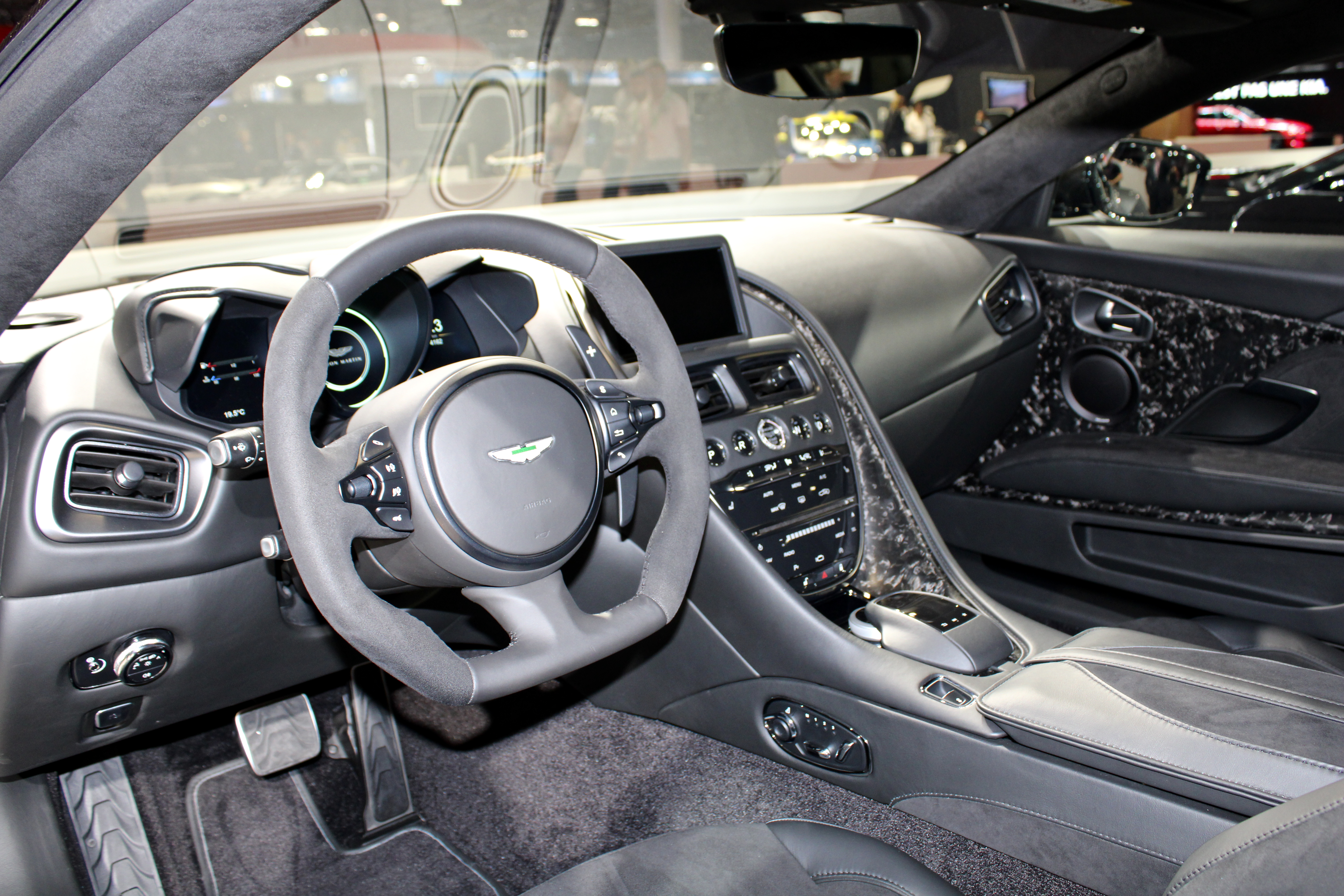
Interior (DBS Superleggera)

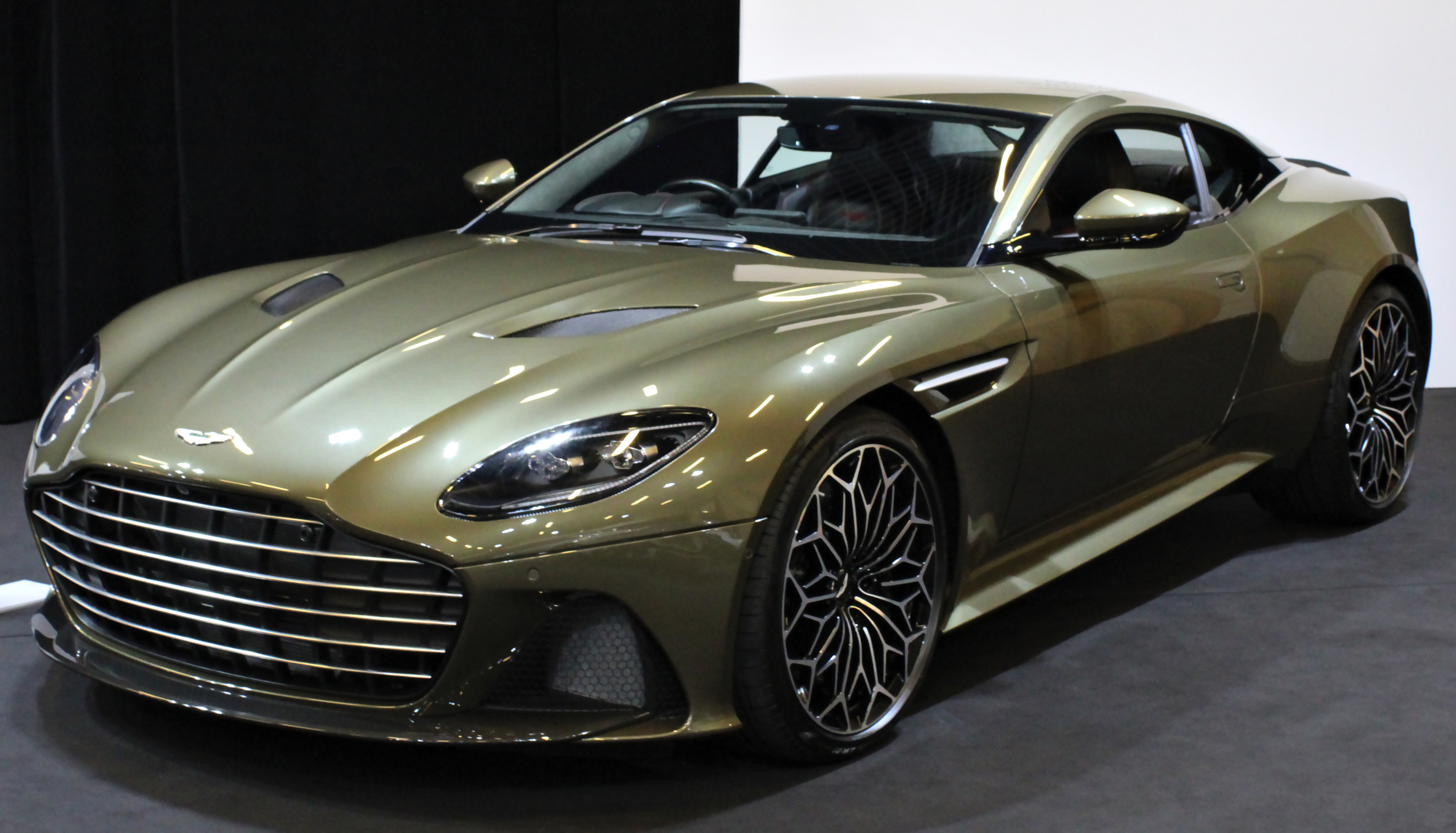
DBS Superleggera OHMSS

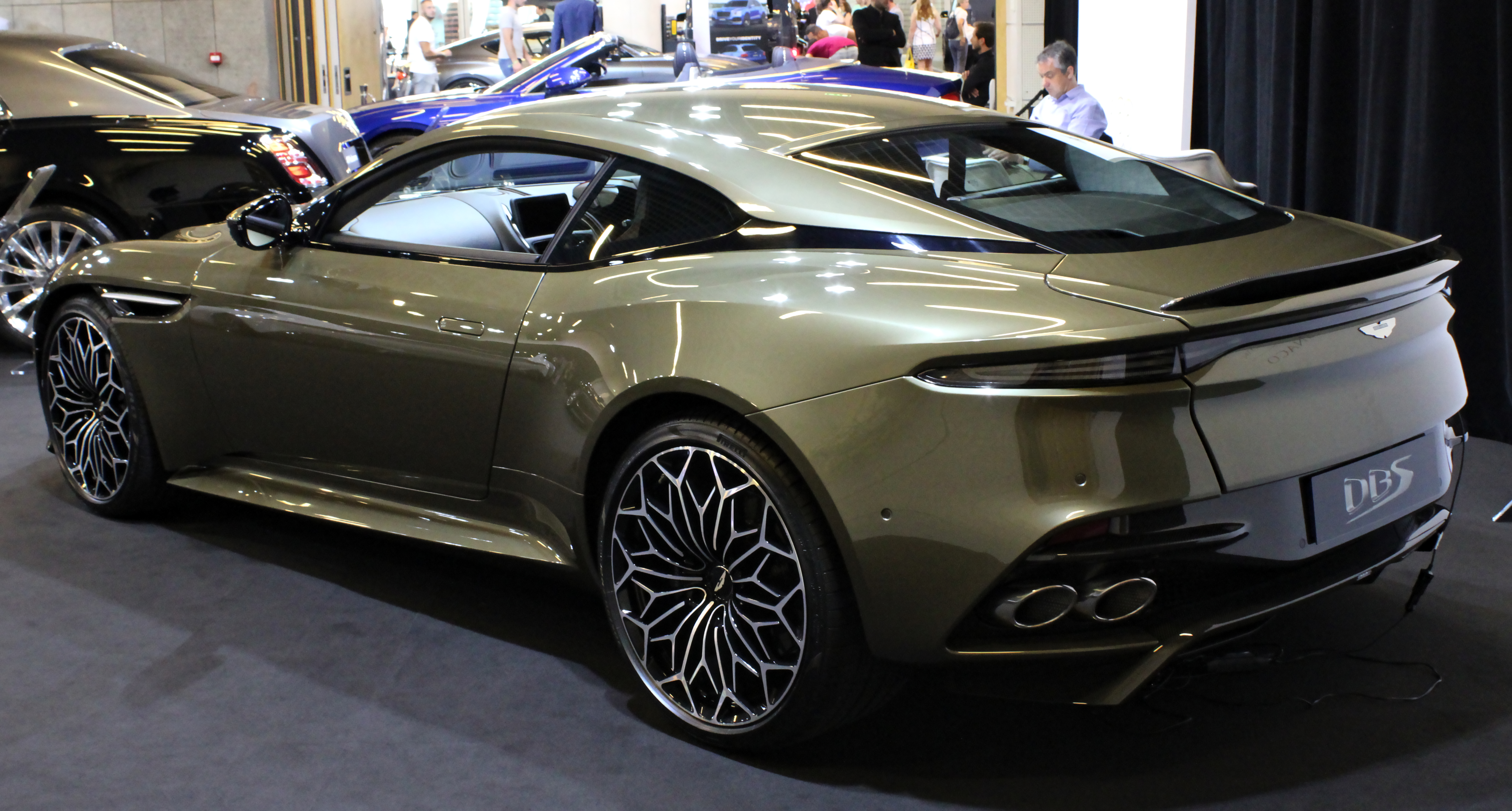
DBS Superleggera OHMSS (rear view)

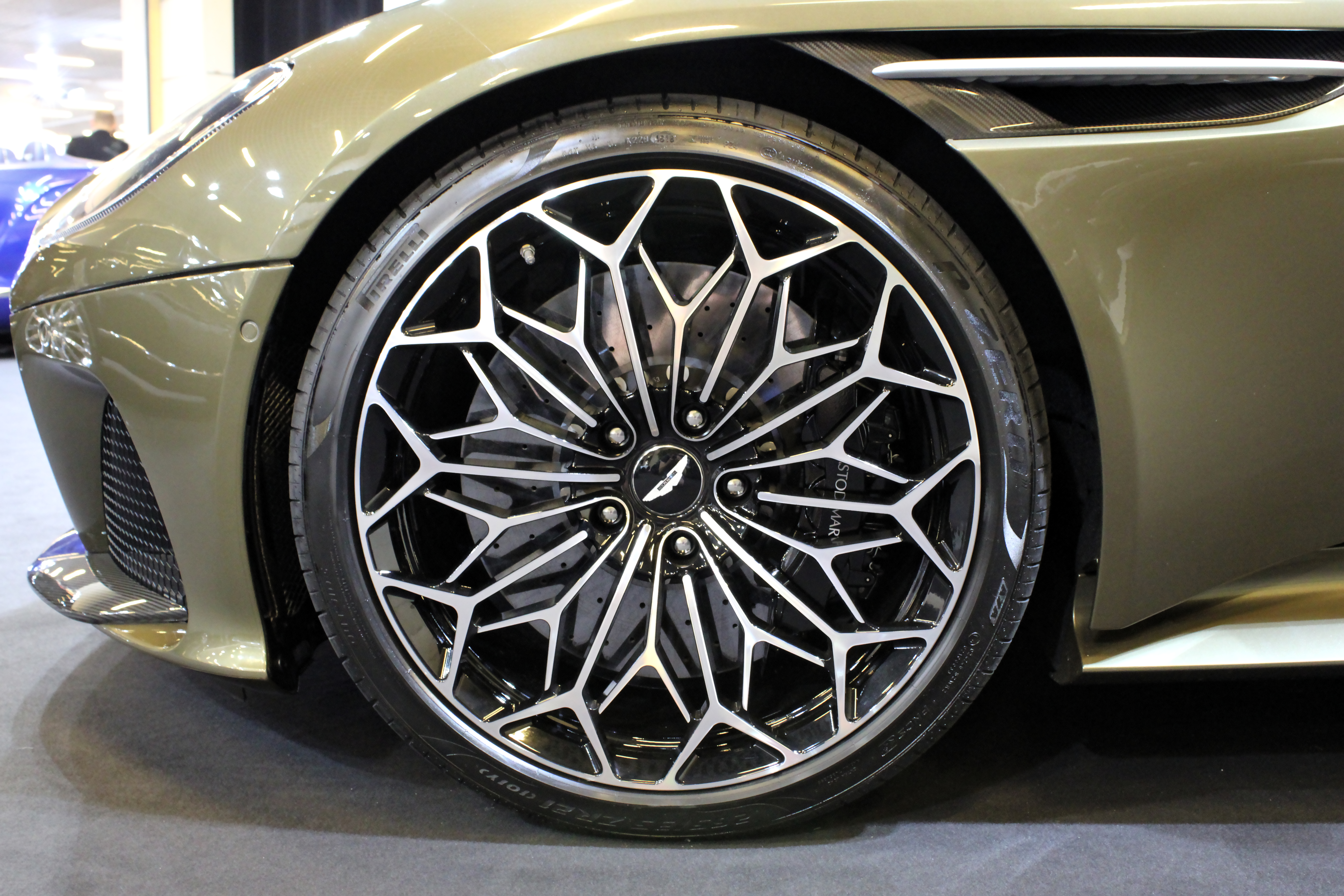
Diamond-turned forged wheel

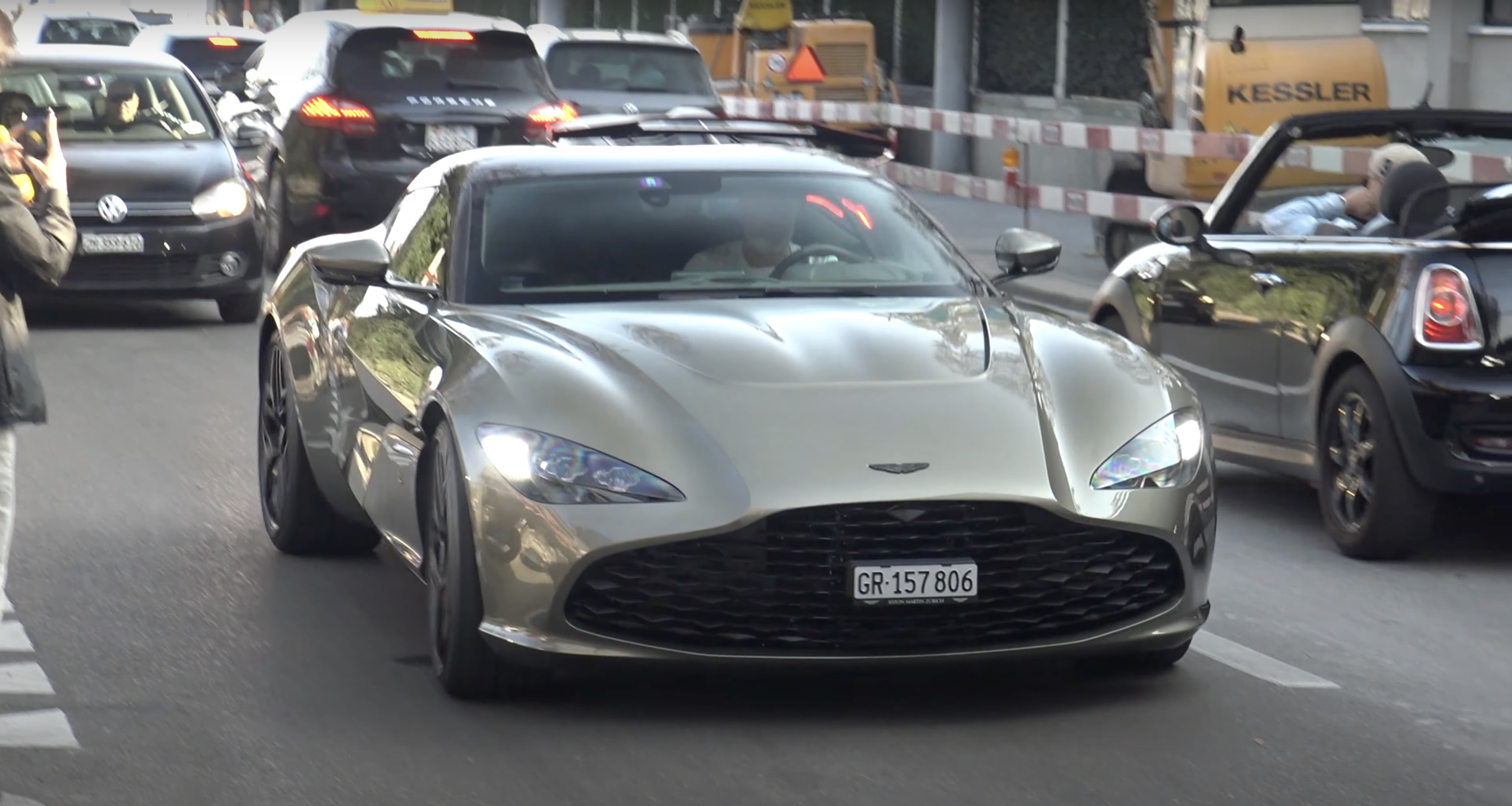
DBS GT Zagato

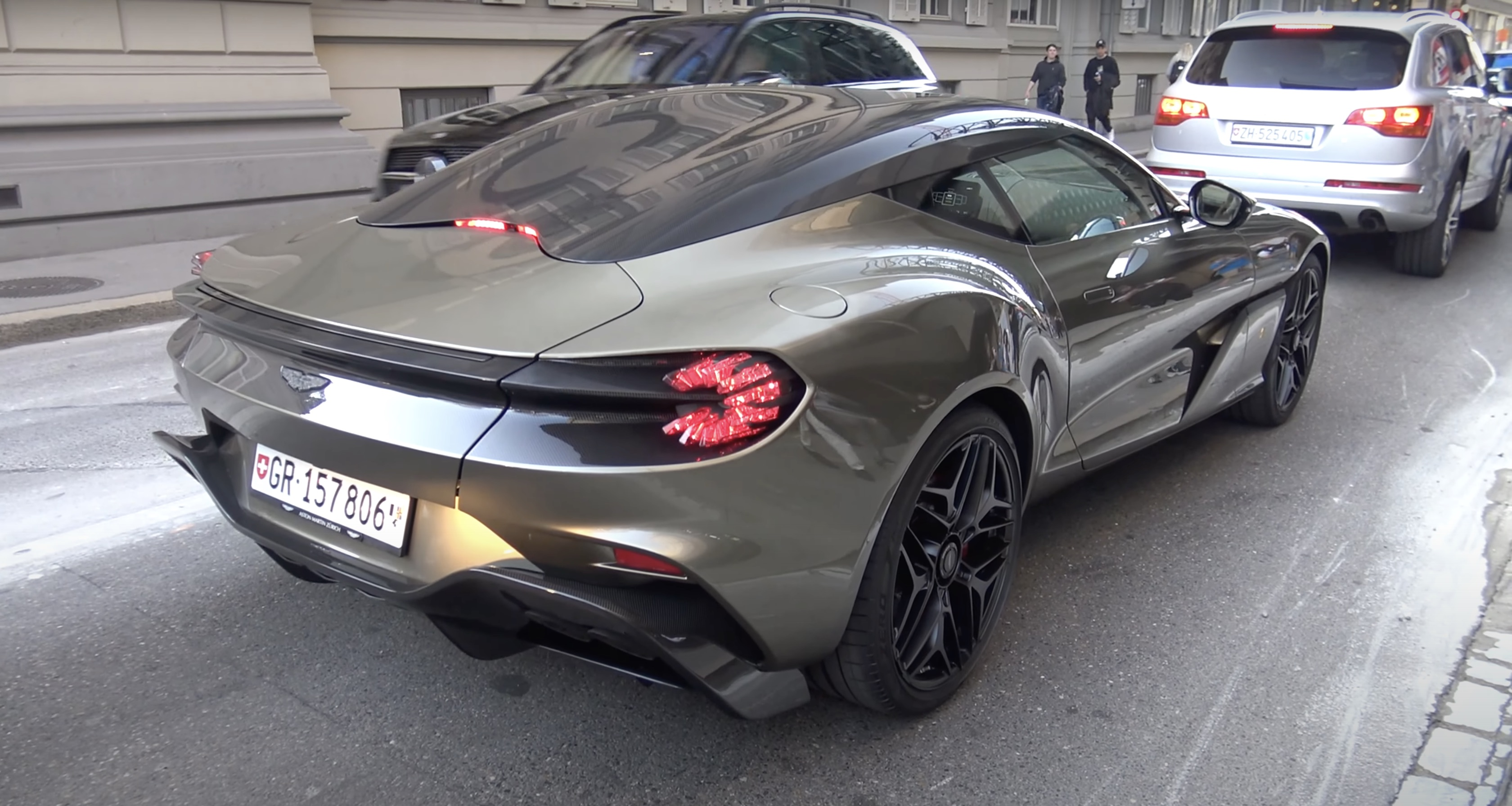
DBS GT Zagato rear

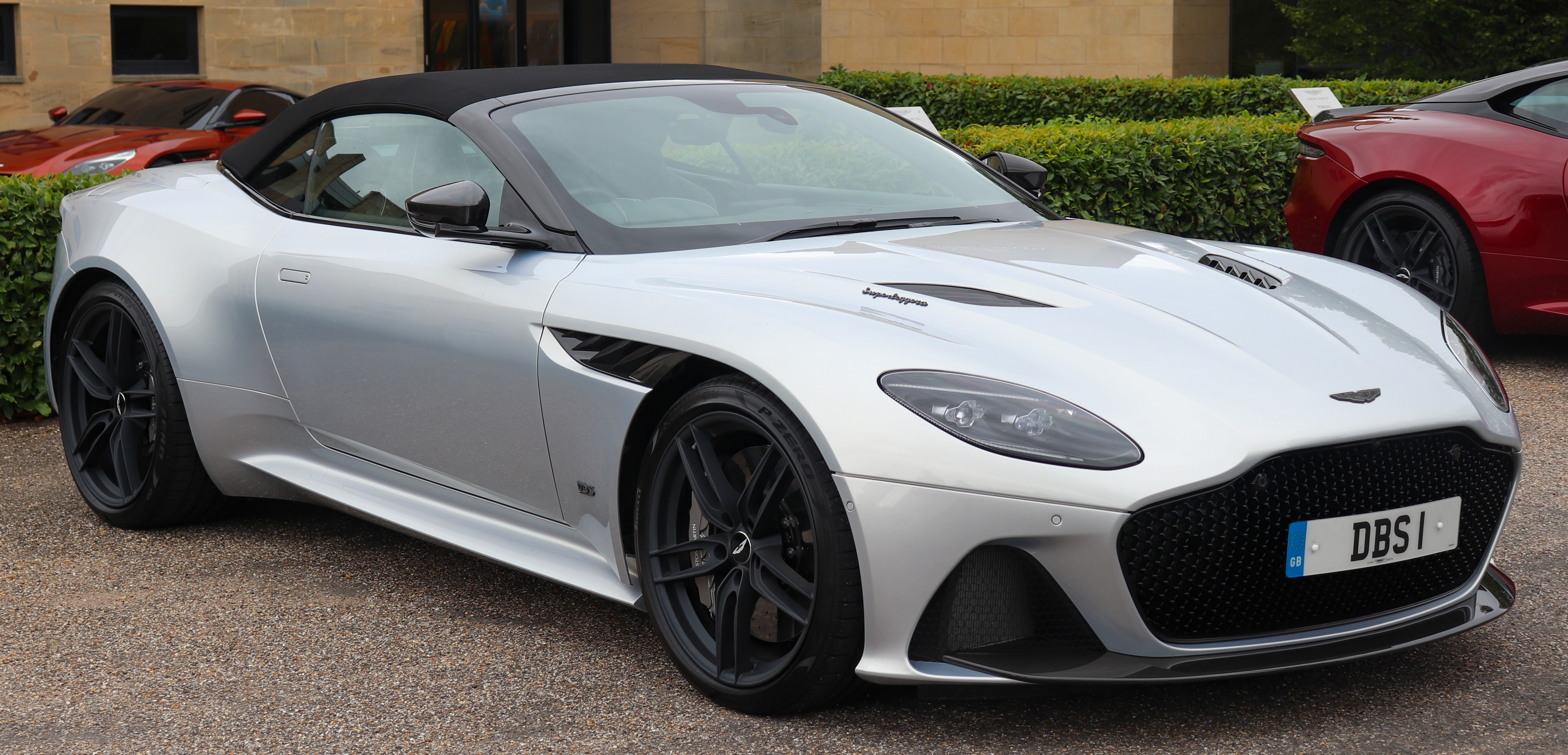
DBS Superleggera Volante

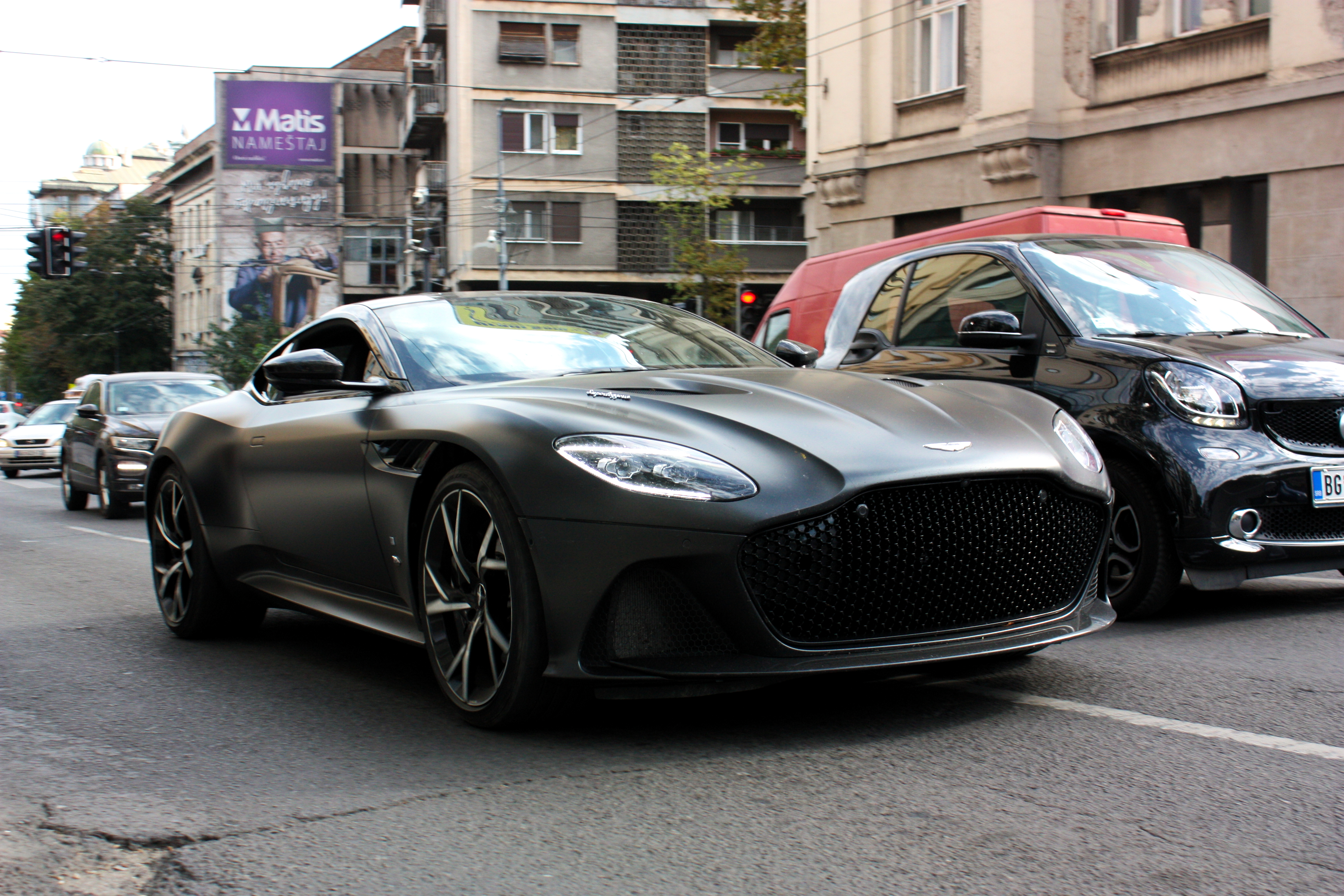
Front view of DBS 007 Edition

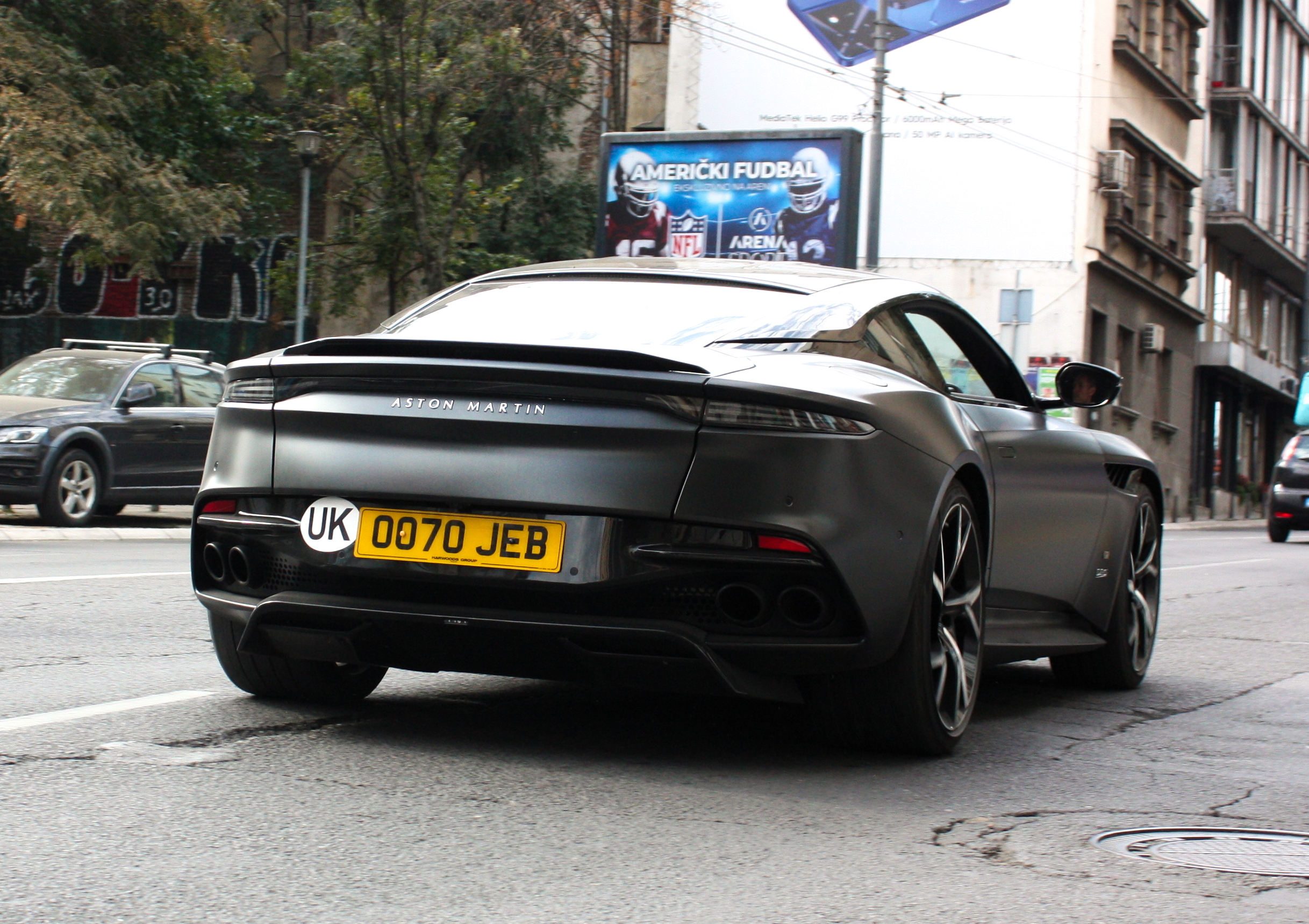
Rear view of DBS 007 Edition

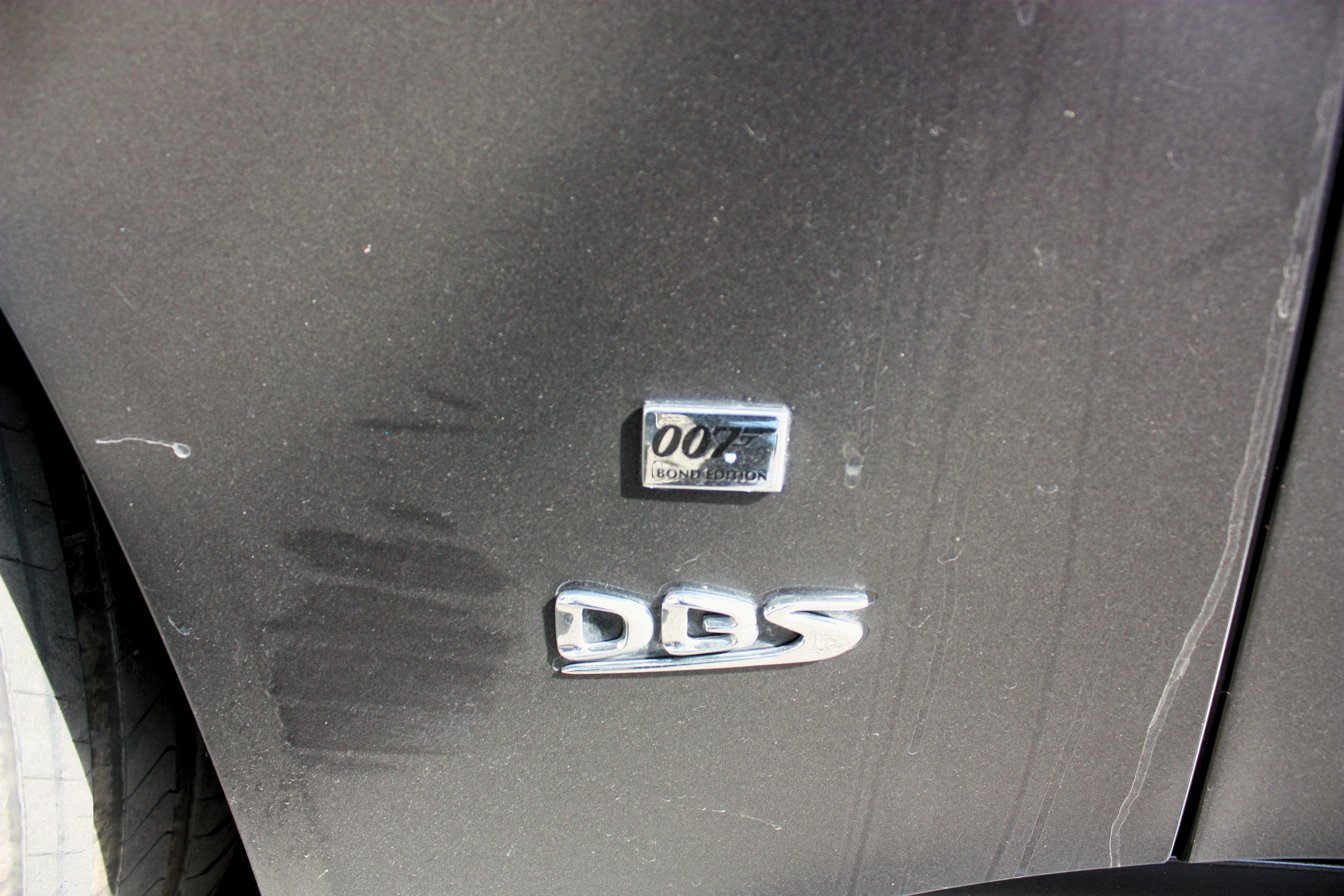
007 Edition badge behind the front wheel.
