= Robes of the British peerage =

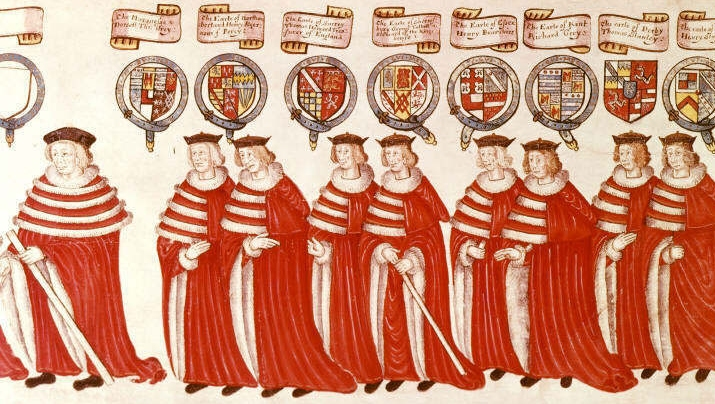
Peers in their robes at the State Opening of Parliament, 4 February 1512. Left to right: the Lord Chamberlain, a Marquess, with white rod of office, several Earls

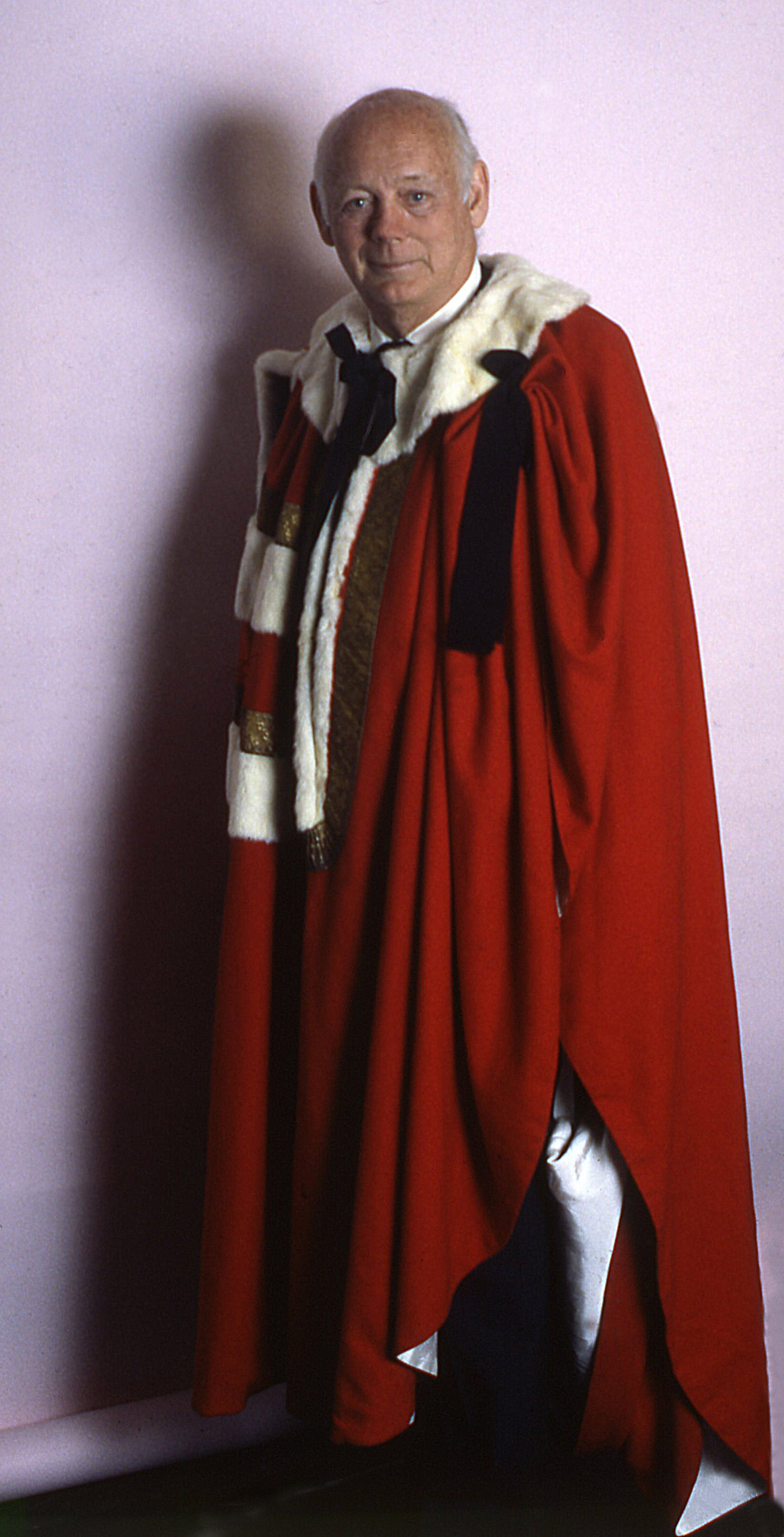
The 3rd Baron Montagu of Beaulieu wearing the parliamentary robes of a baron

Peerage robes are worn in the United Kingdom by peers and are of two varieties for two occasions: Parliament robes, worn on ceremonial occasions in the House of Lords, and Coronation robes, worn at coronations of monarchs.

Peers wear a robe differentiated by features identifying their rank.

== History ==
Since at least the early Middle Ages, robes have been worn as a sign of nobility. At first, these seem to have been bestowed on individuals by the monarch or feudal lord as a sign of special recognition; but in the 15th century the use of robes became formalised, with peers all wearing robes of the same design, though varied according to the rank of the wearer.

Two distinct forms of robe emerged, and these remain in current use: one is worn for parliamentary occasions (such at the State Opening of Parliament); the other is generally worn only at coronations. (Formerly, new peers were invested with their coronation robe by the monarch, but this Investiture ceremony has not taken place since 1621.)

Coronets are worn with the Coronation robe; the robes and coronets used at Elizabeth II's coronation in 1953 cost about £1,250 (roughly £30,300 in present-day terms). (Peers under the rank of an Earl, however, were allowed in 1953 to wear a cheaper "cap of estate" in place of a coronet, as were peeresses of the same rank, for whom a simpler robe was also permitted: a one-piece gown with wrap-around fur cape, designed by Norman Hartnell.)

=== Parliament robes ===
==== Lords Temporal ====
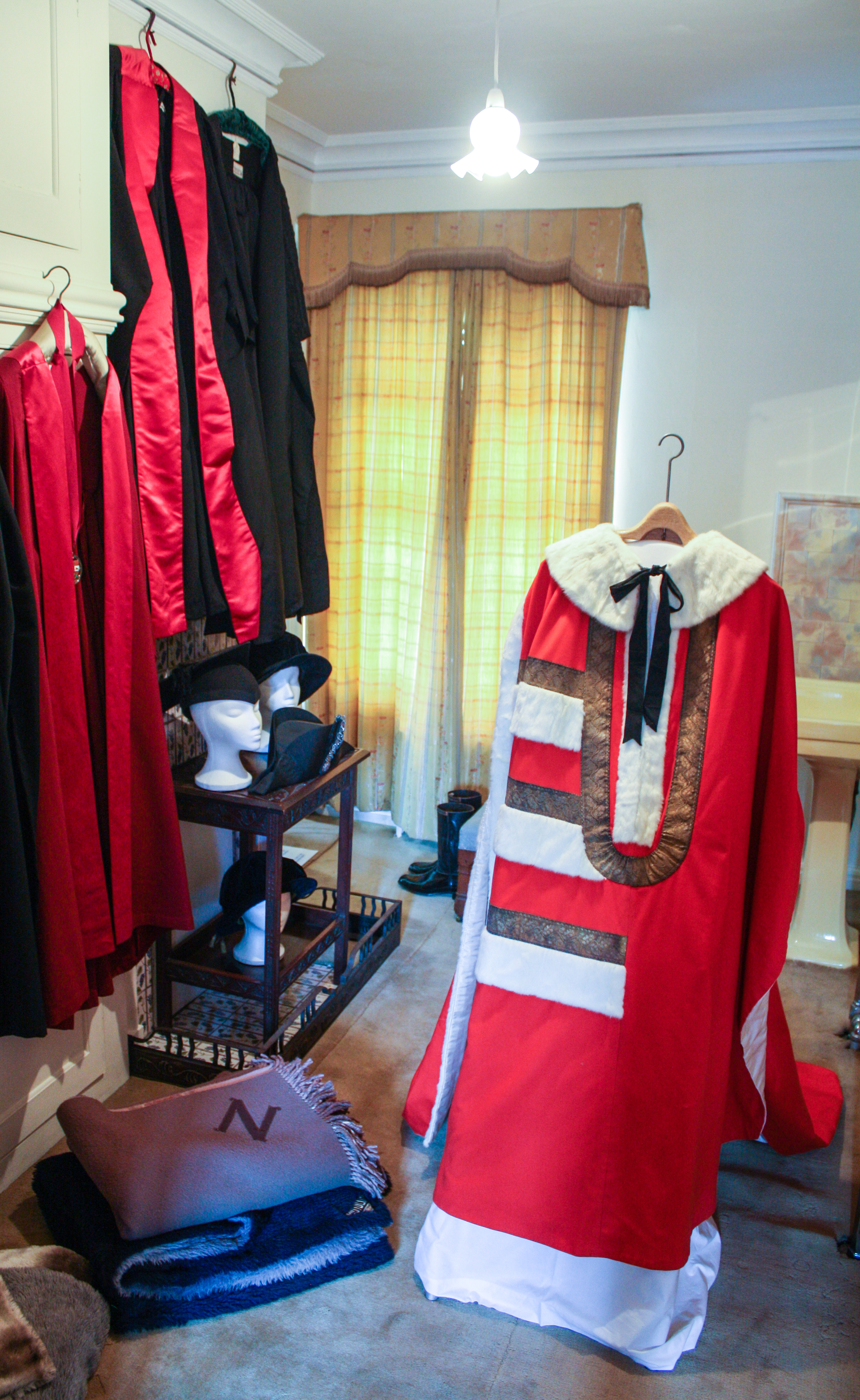
Parliament robe of a viscount, with 2½ bars (Robes of Viscount Nuffield, Nuffield Place, Oxfordshire)

The Parliament robe of a peer is a full-length garment of scarlet wool with a collar of white miniver fur. It is closed at the front with black silk satin ribbon ties (except for a short slit at the neck down half the length of the robe) but open from the shoulder on the right-hand side. (The opposite side is usually tied up with a ribbon to free the left arm.) The back is cut long, as a train, but this is usually kept hooked up inside the garment. Miniver bars (edged with gold oak-leaf lace) on the right-hand side of the robe indicate the rank of the wearer: 4 for a duke, 3½ for a marquess, 3 for an earl, 2½ for a viscount, and 2 for a baron. Today the principal supplier of such robes is the London tailor Ede & Ravenscroft, founded in 1689. These robes are worn by peers at their Introduction to the House of Lords as well as at the State Opening of Parliament. They are also worn by Lords Commissioners when representing the King. They are directed to be worn 'when the peers attend as a body a church service or other ceremony'; however, in the twentieth century they were only twice worn outside Parliament: at the Investitures of the Prince of Wales in 1911 and 1969. The Parliament robe is only worn by Peers who are sworn members of the House of Lords, and the robe is the same for female peers as for males. (Unlike the Coronation robe, there is no equivalent garment for the wives of peers to wear.)

A black bicorne hat is the official headdress for male peers; female peers wear a specially designed tricorne hat, though these are now restricted to certain peers carrying out an official duty where hat doffing is required, e.g. Lords Commissioners at the prorogation of parliament or the approbation of a Speaker of the House of Commons. Before, they were worn at Introductions before the ceremony was simplified to remove the hat doffing portion of the ceremony.

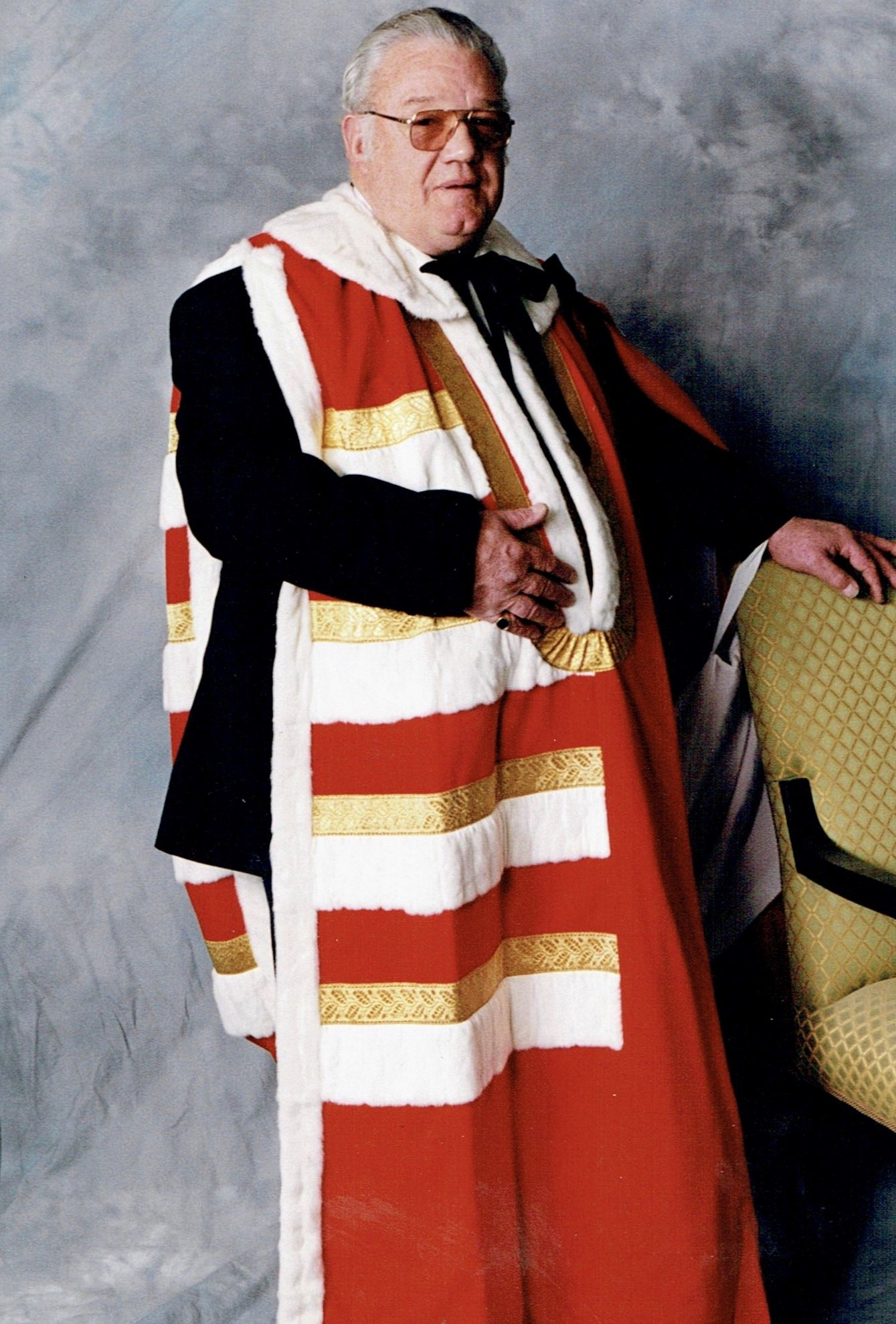
The 12th Duke of Manchester wearing the parliamentary robes of a Duke

==== Lords Spiritual ====
Bishops in the House of Lords have their own distinctive parliamentary robe, which is worn at the State Opening of Parliament. It is akin to the cappa clausa of the University of Cambridge: a full-length scarlet cloak with a cape of plain white fur. This is worn over rochet and chimere, which is the normal day dress for bishops in the House of Lords. As it is a parliament robe, it is not worn at coronations.

=== Coronation robes ===
Coronation robes

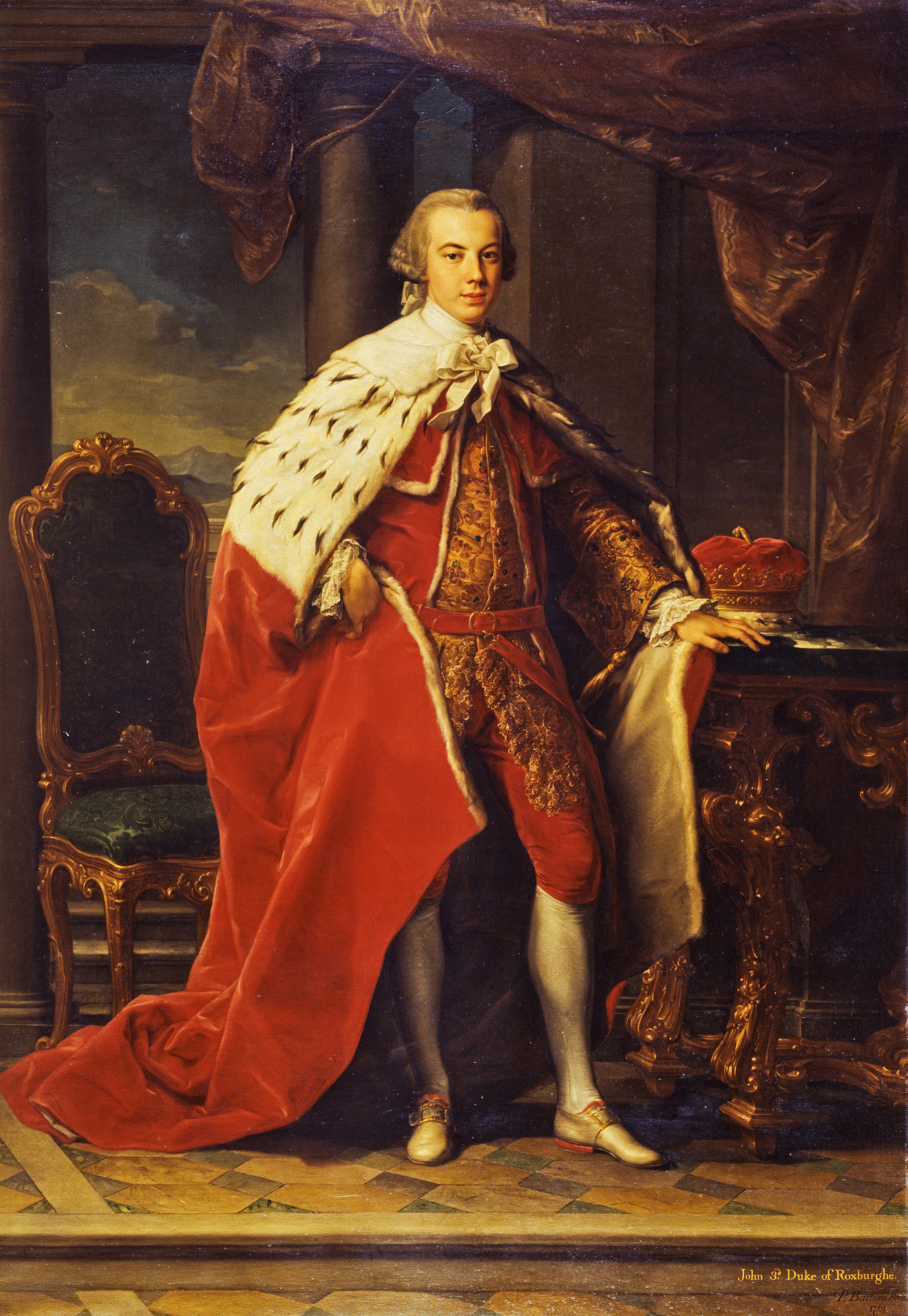
The 3rd Duke of Roxburghe wearing Coronation robes

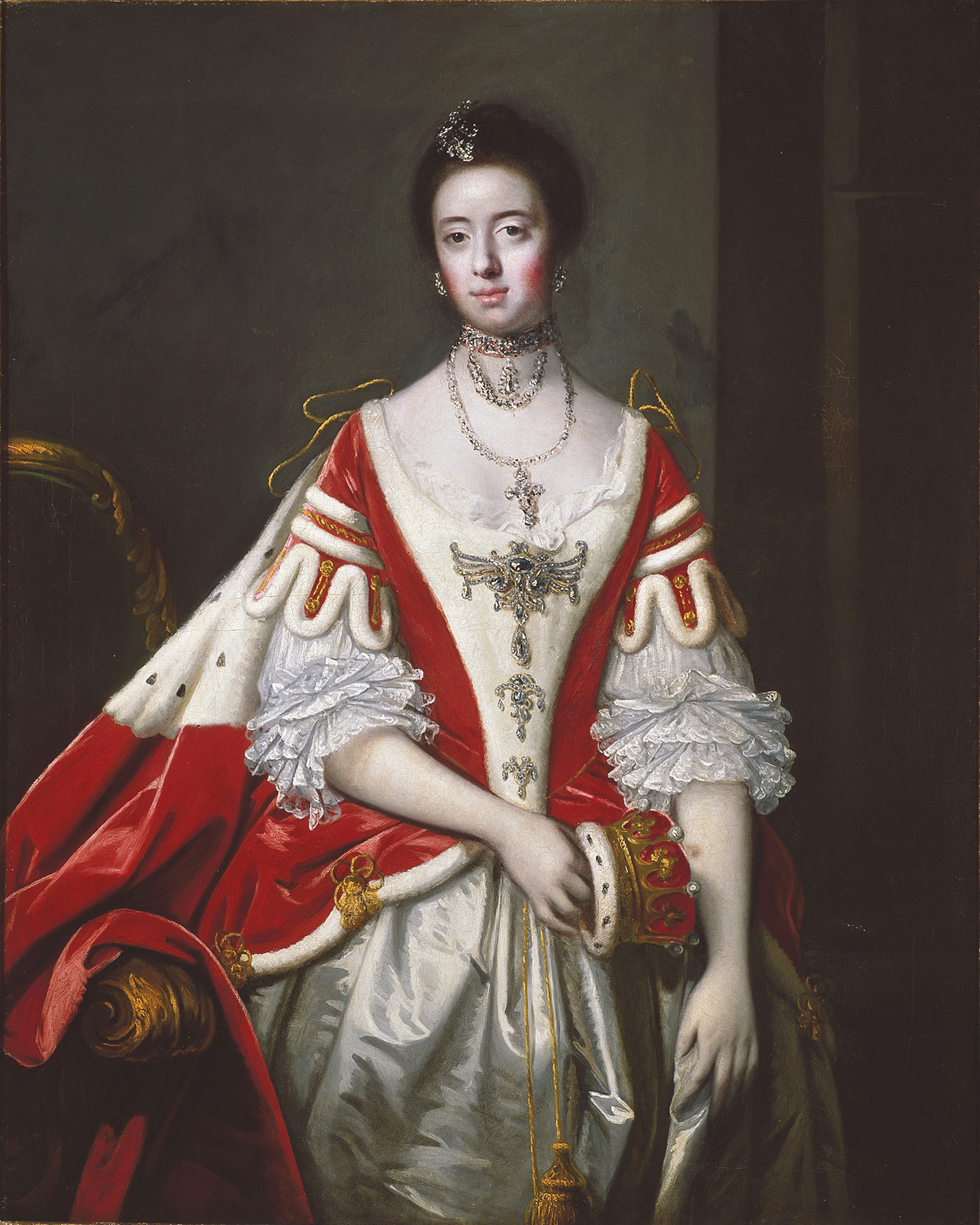
The Countess of Dartmouth, 1757 (matching robe and kirtle worn over a white court dress)

==== Peers ====
For male peers, the Coronation robe is a cloak of crimson velvet extending to the feet, open in the front (with white silk satin ribbon ties) and trailing behind. Attached to the robe is a cape and collar of miniver pure; the rank of the peer is indicated by rows of "ermine tails (or the like)" on the miniver cape: 4 for a duke, 3½ for a marquess, 3 for an earl, 2½ for a viscount and 2 for a baron. (Royal dukes have six rows of ermine, and additional rows on the collar and on the front edges of the garment.) Peers are entitled to wear the Coronation robe whether or not they are members of the House of Lords.

The robes are worn over court uniform and with collars of an order of chivalry if entitled.

==== Peeresses ====
Peeresses (both female peers and the wives of male peers) also wear a crimson robe at coronations, but it is of a different design: a crimson velvet kirtle, edged in miniver, is worn closely over a full evening dress; the robe itself is attached at the shoulder, and takes the form of a long train of matching crimson velvet, edged with miniver. At the top of the train is a miniver cape (the same width as the train) which has rows of ermine indicating rank, as for their male counterparts. The length of the train also denotes the rank of the wearer: duchesses have two-yard trains, marchionesses one and three quarters, countesses one and a half, viscountesses one and a quarter, and baronesses (and female holders of lordships of Parliament) one.

==== Usage ====
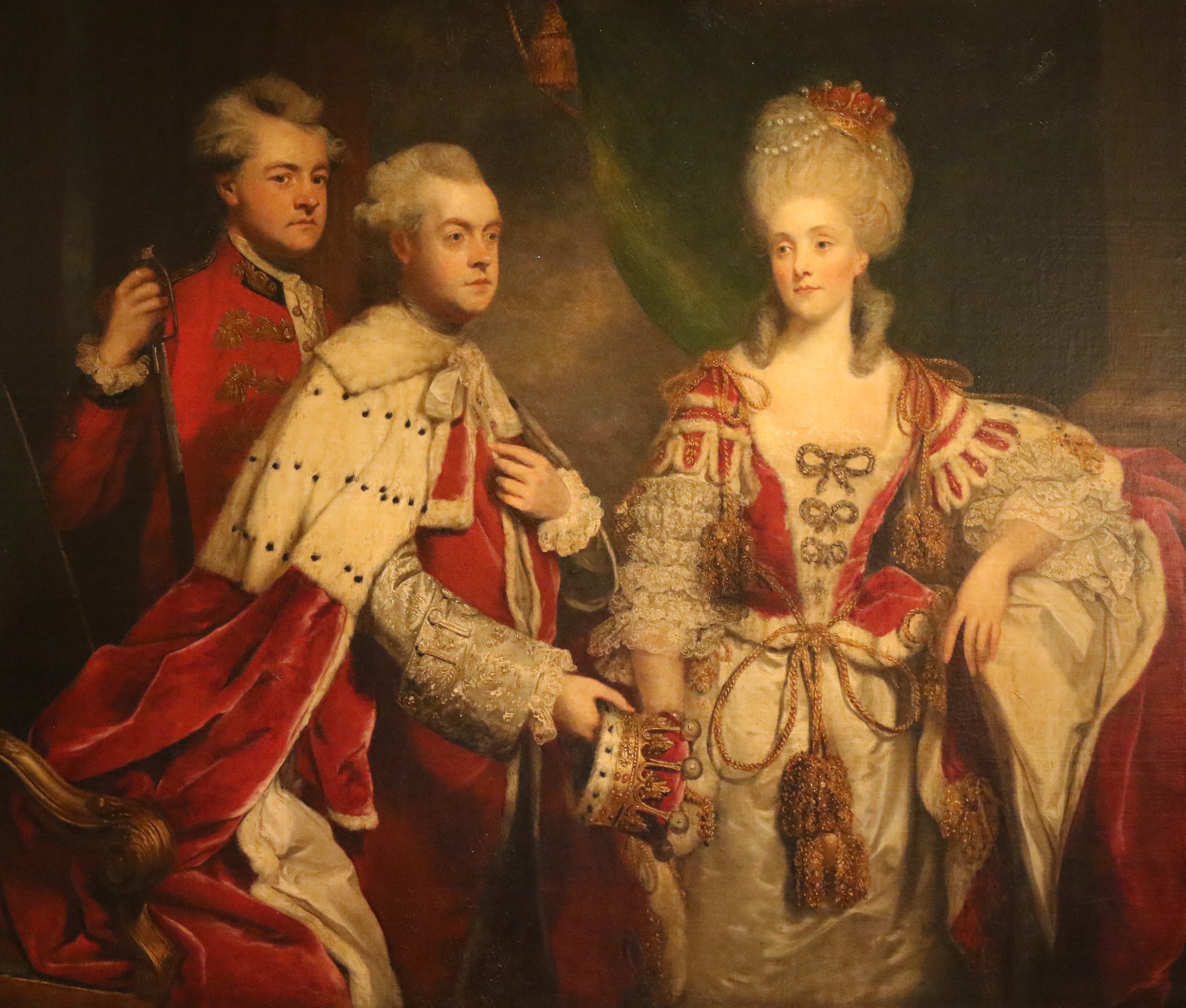
George, 2nd Earl Harcourt and Elizabeth, Countess Harcourt with their coronation peers robes. c.1780 by Joshua Reynolds

In the nineteenth and twentieth centuries, very precise details about the design of peers' and peeresses' robes (and what is to be worn underneath them) were published by the Earl Marshal in advance of each coronation. For the Coronation of King Charles III in 2023, the coronation robes of peers were not initially permitted to be worn by those who were in the congregation, though parliamentary robes were permitted (for those entitled to wear them). After a late U-turn, some did wear a coronation robe (including the Lord Great Chamberlain, who played a key part of the ceremony) while others did not.
