= Miniver =

White fur from ermine or red squirrels

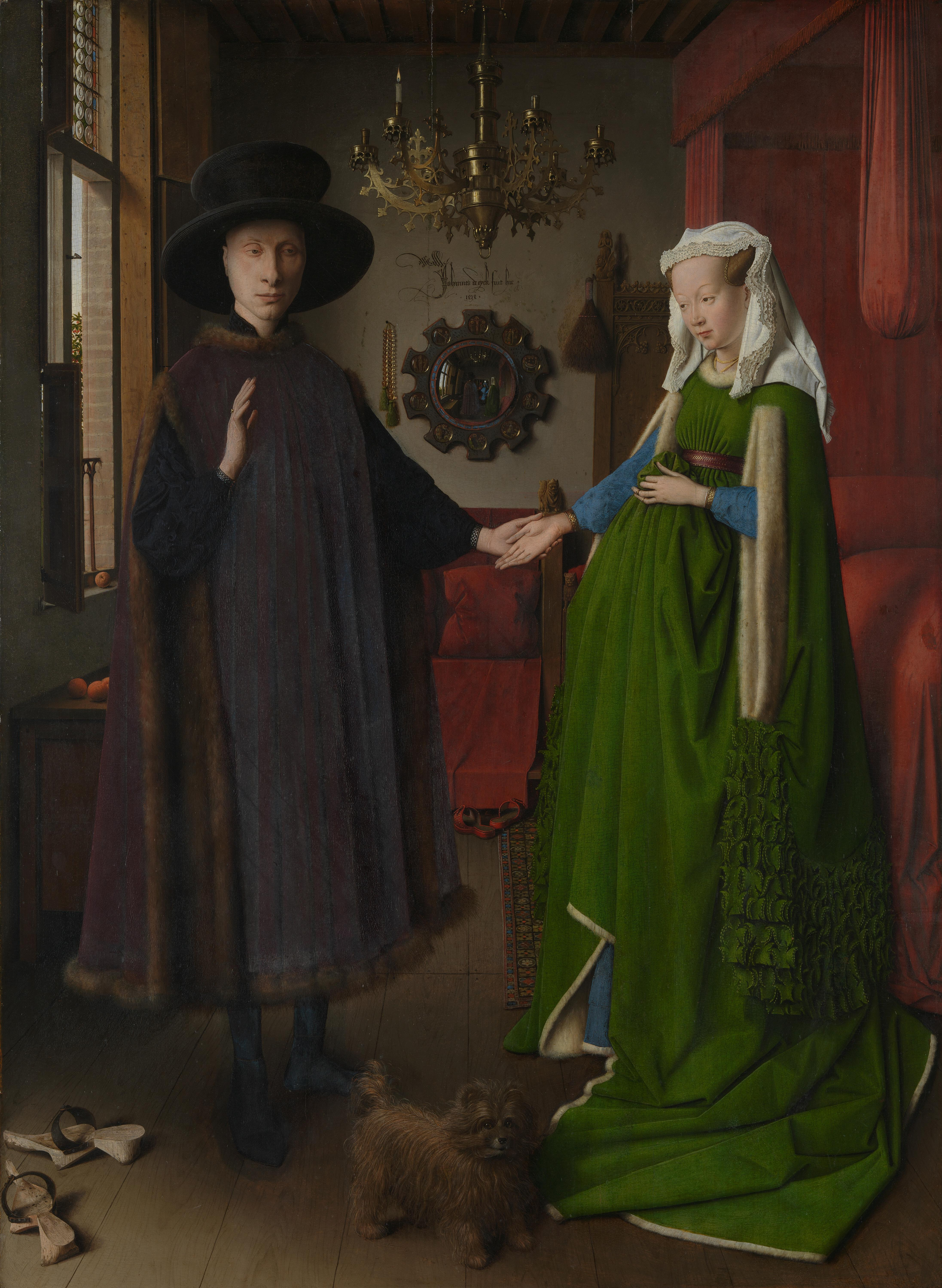
The Arnolfini Portrait by Jan van Eyck (1434); the woman wears a dress trimmed with miniver

Miniver, an unspotted white fur edged with grey, derives originally from the winter coat of the red squirrel. In the Kingdom of England the term became established as a general term for white or almost white fur.

In the original sense, miniver differs from ermine (stoat) fur in that it does not include the distinctive black tails of the stoat but is formed of distinctive grey edged panels cut from the complete fur and framing the white belly. From a red squirrel, which has a greyish-white winter coat with a white underside, miniver gros is the whole fur including the grey, and miniver pure retains only the white part. The heraldic fur vair translates the grey into blue and alternates back and belly.

== See also ==
- The dictionary definition of miniver at Wiktionary
