= Stole Royal =

Robe worn by the British monarch

The Stole Royal (sometime erroneously called the Armilla) is an item of regalia used during the coronation of a British monarch, similar to the stoles worn as vestments by clergymen. It is donned after the anointing of the monarch and is worn throughout the crowning, receiving of homage and conclusion of the communion. The Stole Royal is removed, with other garments, before the procession from Westminster Abbey for which the Imperial Robe is worn.

== Use ==
The monarch enters Westminster Abbey for their coronation wearing the Robe of State. This is removed for the anointing ceremony in which they wear the colobium sindonis ('shroud tunic'), an intentionally plain robe. After the anointing the monarch dons the more ornate Supertunica over the colobium. After they have been invested with regalia including the Spurs, Sword of Offering and the Armills the monarch dons the Stole Royal and Robe Royal over the top of the Supertunica for their crowning ceremony.

Immediately after donning the Stole Royal and Robe Royal the monarch is invested with the Orb, Ring and Sceptres. After the monarch is crowned by the Archbishop of Canterbury and receives homage from the bishops, peers of the realm and members of the Royal Family, the act of communion is concluded and the monarch proceeds to the shrine and tomb of Saint Edward the Confessor. Here the regalia, Robe Royal and Stole Royal are removed and replaced with the Imperial Robe which is worn for the ceremonial procession out of the church. During the Coronation the monarch is enrobed by the Lord Great Chamberlain who is assisted by the Groom of the Robes and the Master of the Robes or Mistress of the Robes.

The Stole Royal is similar to the stoles worn as vestments by clergymen. It is a long, narrow length of cloth worn around the neck with the two ends hanging down the front. The Stoles Royal are usually embroidered with gold and silver thread and decorated with jewels and pearls. The Stole Royal is sometimes improperly called the Armilla, though this refers to the two mediaeval style armlets donned at around the same time as the Stole Royal.

The practice of using a Stole Royal at coronations is thought to date back many years. King Edward I was buried in his coronation robes, and when his tomb was opened in 1774 a stole was among the items found.

== Stole Royal of George IV ==
George IV's stole was created by the tailor John Meyer for the king's coronation in 1821. Measuring 124.5 cm (4 ft) long and 21 cm (8 in) wide, it is made from cloth of silver and embroidered with gold thread and silk, and decorated with sequins. Its fringe is made from gold bullion. The stole features the national flowers of England, Scotland and Ireland, as well as oak and laurel leaves.

== Stole Royal of Queen Victoria ==
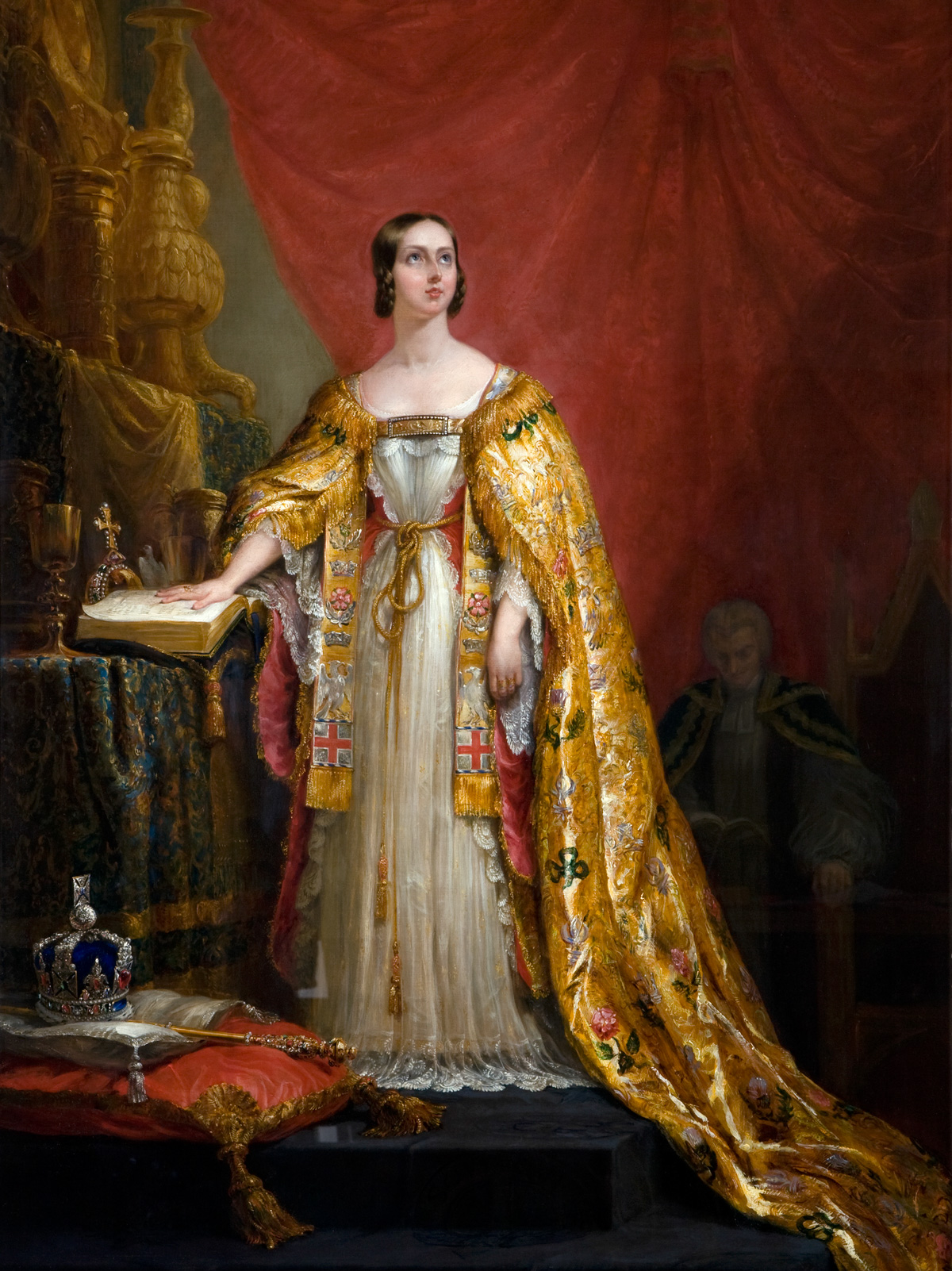
Queen Victoria wearing her stole and the Imperial Mantle, 1838

Queen Victoria's Stole Royal was lined with crimson sarsenet and embroidered with eagles, roses, fleurs-de-lys, crosses and crowns.

== Stole Royal of Edward VII ==
The stole worn by Edward VII at his 1902 coronation was 3 inches (7.6 cm) wide and 45 inches (110 cm) long.

== Stole Royal of George V ==
The Stole Royal of George V was made of cloth of gold with a rose-coloured silk lining. The stole was 3 inches (7.6 cm) in width and 9 feet (270 cm) in length and had a gold bullion fringe at either end. At each end it had the red cross of Saint George on white background. Above the cross was embroidery depicting an eagle, representing the Empire, surmounted by symbols of the Home Nations: a rose (for England), thistle (for Scotland), shamrock (for Ireland), dragon (for Wales). Above these were symbols of the dominions: a lotus (for India), maple (for Canada), wattle flower (for South Africa), the Southern Cross (for Australia) and the stars from the New Zealand flag.

== Stole Royal of George VI ==
The Stole Royal of George VI was made of cloth of gold and decorated with symbols of the Empire in coloured thread and arranged in a flowing pattern.

== Stole Royal of Elizabeth II ==
Elizabeth II wore a narrow Stole Royal of gold silk with fringed ends and a lining of red silk. This Stole Royal was made in 1953 by the Worshipful Company of Girdlers, based on mediaeval patterns. It had intricate embroidery showing various religious, national and Commonwealth symbols. Among the Christian symbols used are the crosses of Saint Andrew, Saint George and Saint Patrick, the patron saints of Scotland, England and Ireland, and the crossed keys of Saint Peter, an early leader of the Christian church. Also included are symbols associated with the Four Evangelists: an angel for Matthew, a winged lion for Mark, a winged bull for Luke and an eagle for John. A dove represents the Holy Spirit and a crowned eagle also features. Depictions of plants were used to represent the Home Nations and Commonwealth Realms including a Tudor rose (England), a leek (Wales), shamrock (Northern Ireland), thistle (Scotland), wattle flower (Australia), maple leaf (Canada), two types of lotus (India and Sri Lanka), fern (New Zealand), cotton, jute and wheat (Pakistan) and the protea (South Africa).

== Stole Royal of Charles III ==
A new Stole Royal was made in 2023 for Charles III by the Royal School of Needlework, taking inspiration from the 1953 stole of his predecessor, Elizabeth II. It is adorned with emblems of the four countries of the United Kingdom, a dove representing the Holy Spirit, a Tudor-style crown, and a pattern based on the Cosmati Pavement in Westminster Abbey.
