= Robe Royal =

Robe worn by the British monarch

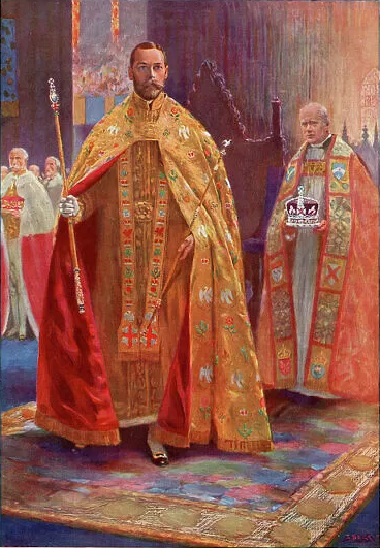
A depiction of George V in Westminster Abbey in 1911, while wearing the Supertunica, Stole Royal and Robe Royal

The Robe Royal (also known as the Pallium Regale, Imperial Mantle or Dalmatic Robe) is a robe worn by the British monarch when he or she is crowned. It is donned just before the monarch is invested with the Orb, Ring and Sceptres. It is worn during the crowning and paying of homage. The Robe Royal used is one originally created for the 1821 coronation of George IV.

== Use ==
The monarch enters Westminster Abbey for their coronation wearing the Robe of State. This is removed for the Anointing ceremony in which they wear the Colobium sindonis ("shroud tunic"), an intentionally plain robe. After the Anointing the monarch dons the more ornate Supertunica over the Colobium. After they have been invested with regalia including the Spurs, Sword of Offering and the Armills the monarch dons the Robe Royal over the top of the Supertunica and also wears the Stole Royal.

The monarch is then invested with the Orb, Ring and Sceptres and crowned by the Archbishop of Canterbury. They remain in the Robe Royal as they receive homage from the bishops, peers of the realm and members of the Royal Family and the Communion is conclude. The monarch then moves to the shrine and tomb of St Edward the Confessor where the regalia, Robe Royal and Stole Royal are removed and replaced with the Imperial Robe for the procession out of Westminster Abbey. During the Coronation the monarch is enrobed by the Lord Great Chamberlain who is assisted by the Groom of the Robes and the Master of the Robes or Mistress of the Robes.

== Description ==
Unlike most of the robes used in the coronation the Robe Royal is not typically made new for each monarch. The one in current use was made for the 1821 coronation of George IV. The design of the robe was based on the earlier mantles worn by Tudor and Stuart monarchs and, indeed, is little changed from those worn in the medieval period which were based on the Dalmatic vestment used by clergy. The association with ecclesiastical attire is intentional and meant as a reminder of the divine nature of the monarchy. The George IV Robe Royal is the oldest robe used in the coronation ceremony.

The George IV Robe Royal is gold-coloured with symbols including foliage, crowns, fleurs-de-lis, eagles, roses, thistles and shamrocks embroidered in coloured thread. It is worn as a mantle and closed by a gold clasp in the shape of an eagle. The George IV Robe Royal was made by John Meyer for £24, with the gold clasp manufactured by goldsmiths Rundell, Bridge and Rundell. After the coronation of George IV the robe was retained by the Dean and Chapter of Westminster before passing into private hands. It was returned to the Crown in the early 20th century and was used at the 1911 coronation of George V, the 1937 coronation of George VI, the 1953 coronation of Elizabeth II, and the 2023 coronation of Charles III. A new Robe Royal was made by Werner and Sons of Braintree, Essex, in preparation for the coronation of Edward VIII. After this coronation was cancelled his successor, George VI, elected to use the George IV robe instead.

== See also ==
- Robe of State
- Imperial Robe
- St Edward's Crown
