= Robe of State =

Robe worn by the British monarch

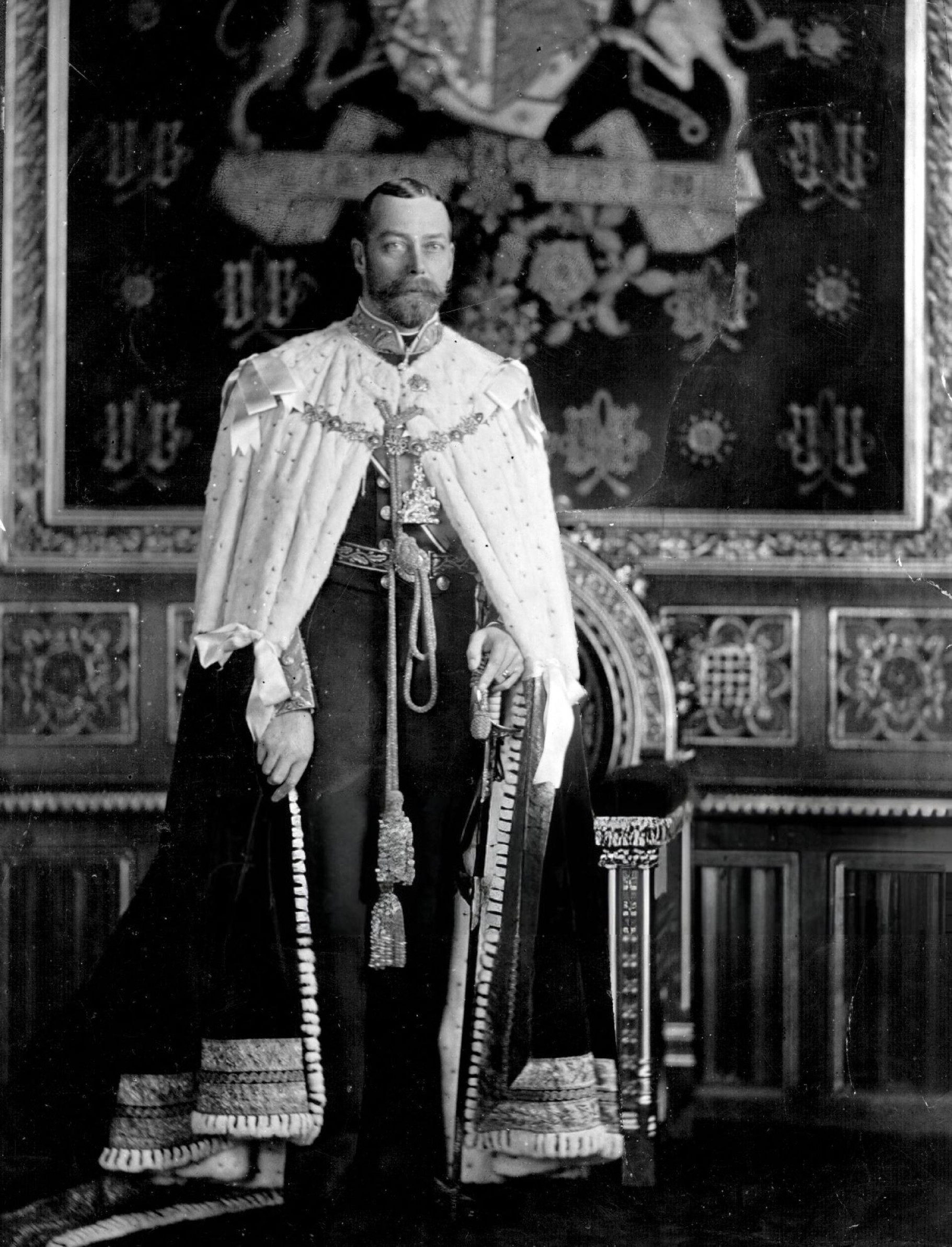
George V wearing his Robe of State at a State Opening of Parliament c.1911.

The Robe of State (also known as the Parliament Robe) is a robe worn by the British monarch on state occasions. A monarch typically has a robe made for their coronation and reuses it when attending the State Opening of Parliament at the start of each legislative session. Traditionally the robes have an ermine cape with a long train made of crimson coloured velvet, trimmed in gold lace and lined with ermine.

== Use ==
The Robe of State is worn by the monarch for their entrance into Westminster Abbey for their coronation. It is worn subsequently for the State Opening of Parliament and from this association derives its alternative name of Parliament Robe. Recent kings Edward VII, George V and George VI all wore the Cap of State in conjunction with the robe at their coronations but Charles III chose not to do so. The Robe of State remains in place during Recognition, Acclamation, the administering of the Coronation Oath and the first part of the service of Communion.

The Robe of State is removed for the Anointing ceremony, during which the monarch wears the plain Colobium sindonis ("shroud tunic") to symbolise they are divesting themselves of worldly vanity. The monarch later dons the Supertunica, Robe Royal and Imperial Robe for the final parts of the ceremony. During the Coronation the monarch is enrobed by the Lord Great Chamberlain who is assisted by the Groom of the Robes and the Master of the Robes.

== Examples ==
A new Robe of State is often commissioned ahead of each coronation. They are traditionally in the same style, a waist-length ermine cape with a long crimson velvet train, lined with ermine and trimmed in gold lace.

George III's Robe of State was made by Ede and Ravenscroft and was formed of 36 yards (33 m) of red velvet and 116 yards (106 m) of gold lace and was worn over a suit made from cloth of gold. The Robe was 104 centimetres (41 in) wide and 471.5 centimetres (185.6 in) long.

The Robe of State for the coronation of Queen Victoria was made by John Hunter and cost £643 8s 9d. The robe was re-used by Elizabeth II for her first state opening of parliament, before she had her own robe made for her coronation.

George V wore the Robe of State of his father, Edward VII, for his first state opening of parliament but a new Robe of State was made for his 1911 coronation. This was made by Wilkinsons of Maddox Street, London.

The Robe of State of George VI was of crimson velvet, trimmed in ermine and with a border of gold lace. The robe was draped over the King's coffin at his lying in state. His grandson, Charles III, wore the same robe for his coronation. The velvet was conserved by the Royal School of Needlework, with the lining and gold lace conserved by Ede & Ravenscroft. King Charles wore a seemingly new Robe of State for the 2026 State Opening of Parliament.

The Robe of State for the coronation of Elizabeth II was made by Ede & Ravenscroft with embroidery designed and madby the Royal School of Needlework. The ermine used came from Canada. The robe is of crimson velvet with a cape of ermine, with black fur tails. It is 18 feet 4.5 inches (5.601 m) in length and at the end of the train measures 4 feet (1.2 m) in width. The entire train is lined with ermine and the outside has a border of ermine several inches thick. There is also a border of gold lace and several ermine tails. Elizabeth II's robe was used for the coronation of her daughter-in-law, Camilla, in 2023 after adjustments by Ede & Ravenscroft.

== See also ==
- Robe Royal
- Robe of Estate
- Imperial State Crown
