= Imperial Robe =

British monarch robe

The Imperial Robe (also Robe of Estate or Imperial State Robe) is a robe used in the coronation of the British monarch. It is donned in the final stages of the ceremony for the procession of the monarch from Westminster Abbey to the waiting Gold State Coach. These Robes were last seen at the coronation of Charles III and Camilla, with King Charles III wearing the Imperial Robe of George V, and Queen Camilla having a new robe made for her.

== Use ==
The robe is donned at the end of the coronation when, after being crowned and receiving homage the monarch proceeds to the shrine and tomb of Saint Edward the Confessor. Here the regalia are removed and the Robe Royal and Stole Royal taken off. The monarch is enrobed with the Imperial Robe and processes out of the Abbey whilst wearing the Imperial State Crown and carrying the Orb and Sceptre with Cross. During the coronation the monarch is enrobed by the Lord Great Chamberlain who is assisted by the Groom of the robes and the Master of the Robes or Mistress of the Robes. The monarch enters the Gold State Coach to return to Buckingham Palace where their coronation day concludes with a balcony appearance to the waiting public.

== Imperial Robe of George V ==
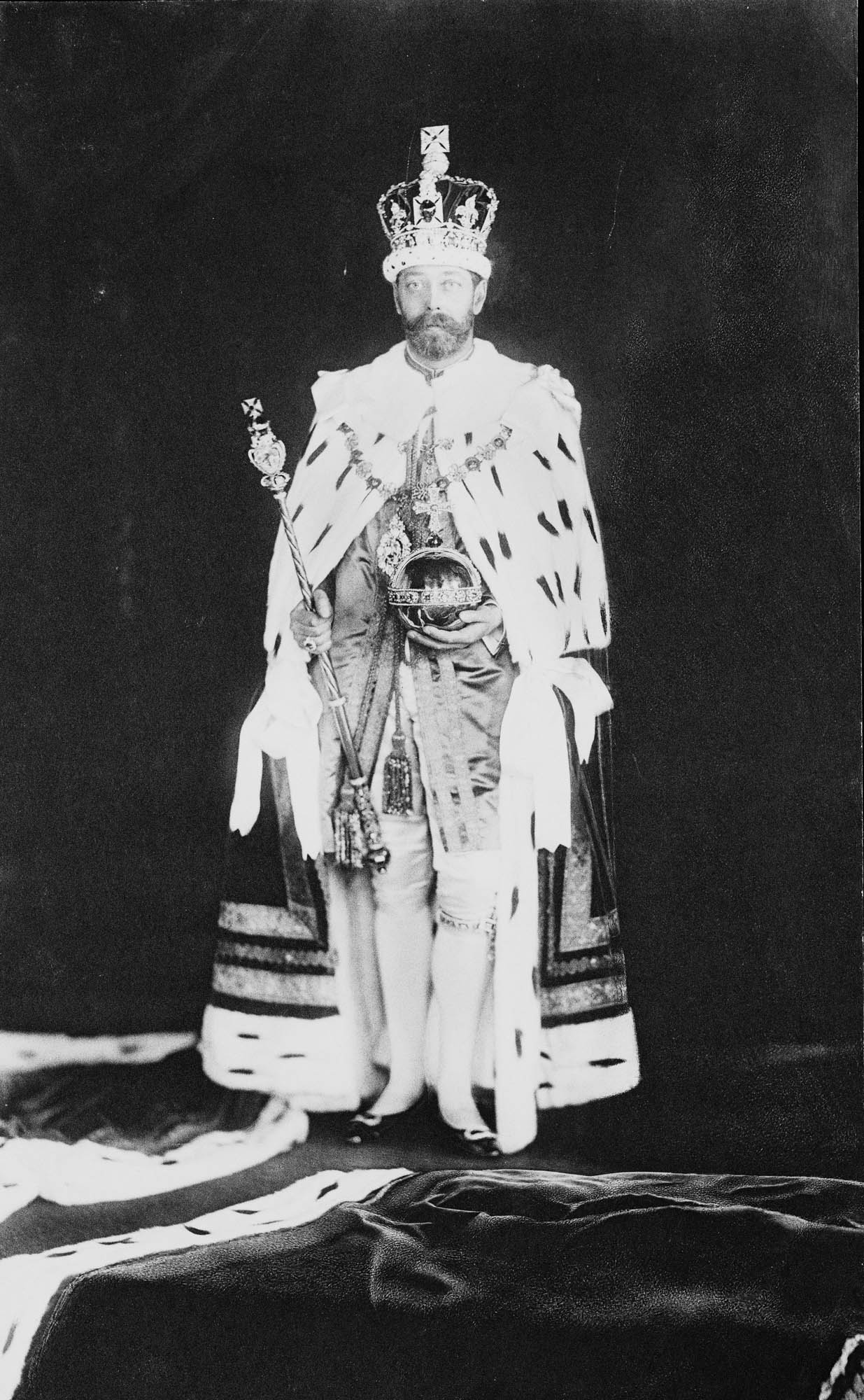
George V wearing his own Imperial Robe after his coronation

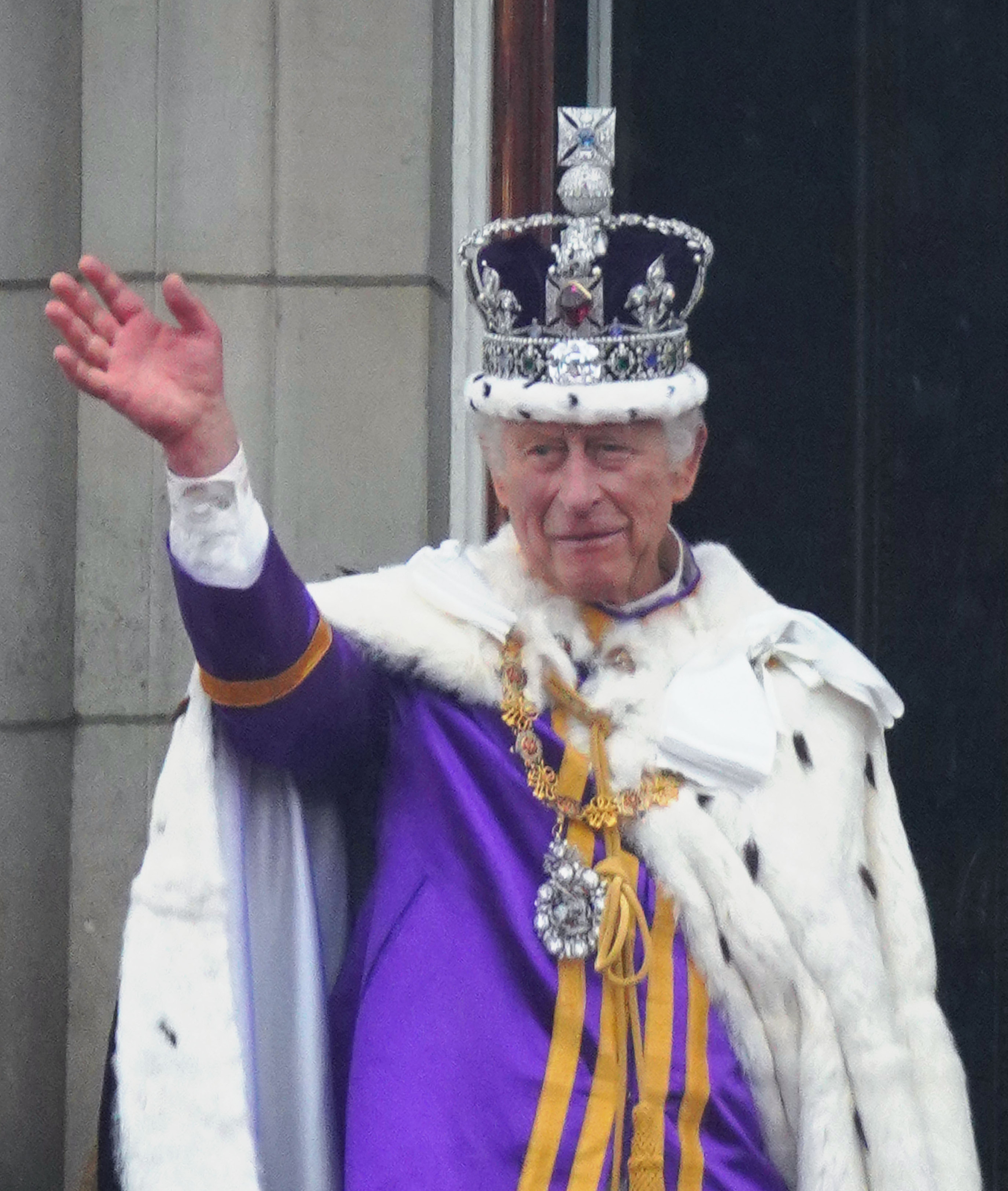
Charles III wearing his great-grandfather's Imperial Robe after his coronation

The Imperial Robe of George V was made of purple silk velvet embroidered in gold. After adjustments by Ede & Ravenscroft, the Imperial Robe of George V was used by his great-grandson, Charles III, for his coronation in 2023.

== Imperial Robe of Elizabeth II ==
Most robes used in the coronation ceremony, with the exception of the historic Robe Royal and Supertunica, are made new for each monarch. Elizabeth II firstly considered reusing her grandfather's Imperial Robe, as her father did at his coronation in 1937, but instead decided to commission a new one, in line with tradition.

There was concern that in post-war austerity Britain that sufficient material would not be found to make the robe but supplies of raw silk were sourced from the silk farm of Lady Zoe Hart Dyke in Lullingstone, Kent. The silk was woven into velvet on a hand loom. Elizabeth's Imperial Robe is 6.5 metres (21 ft) long and weighs 15 pounds (6.8 kg). It is of purple velvet trimmed with ermine. It is decorated with embroidery featuring 18 types of gold thread, seed pearls, crystals and coloured silks. The designs include national and Commonwealth symbols and crowns; the principal design is a border of wheat ears, symbolising plenty, and olive branches, symbolising peace. The embroidery took a team of 12 people 3,500 hours to make between March and May 1953.

== See also ==
- Robe of State
- Robe Royal
- Imperial State Crown
