= Supertunica =

British coronation robe

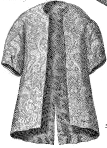
The cloth of gold Supertunica of James II

A Supertunica is a robe worn by British monarchs at their coronation. It is donned shortly after the Anointing ceremony for the vesting of the Spurs, Sword of Offering and the Armills. Afterwards the Stole Royal and Robe Royal are worn on top of the Supertunica for the crowning of the monarch. The Supertunica, Stole and Robe are replaced with the Imperial Robe for the final procession from Westminster Abbey.

== Use ==
The monarch enters Westminster Abbey for their coronation wearing the Robe of State. This is removed for the Anointing ceremony in which they wear the Colobium sindonis ("shroud tunic"), an intentionally plain robe. After the Anointing the monarch dons the more ornate Supertunica over the Colobium. It is worn whilst the monarch is invested with other regalia including the Spurs, Sword of Offering and the Armills after which the monarch dons the Stole Royal and Robe Royal over the top of the Supertunica for their crowning ceremony. All of the robes are removed before the final part of the ceremony, the procession out of the Abbey, in which the monarch wears the Imperial Robe. During the Coronation the monarch is enrobed by the Lord Great Chamberlain who is assisted by the Groom of the Robes and the Master of the Robes or Mistress of the Robes.

The Supertunica, with the Colobium, have the longest history of any of the coronation robes, dating to the medieval period. The use of these garments is recorded in the Liber Regalis, a manuscript detailing coronation practice in the 14th century. The Supertunica is designed to resemble ecclesiastical robes as a reminder of the divine nature of the monarchy. Whilst most robes used in the coronation are newly made and particular to that monarch, the Supertunica used in modern coronations is that made for George V for his coronation in 1911. It was subsequently worn by George VI at his coronation in 1937, Elizabeth II at her coronation in 1953, and Charles III at his coronation in 2023. The Supertunica was one of several coronation robes reused by Charles III as an expression of his interest in reducing wastefulness by reusing items where possible.

== George IV ==
The Supertunica of George IV was a straight coat of gold cloth decorated with gold flowers and lined with crimson taffeta. The Supertunica was around 1.25 yards (1.14 m) in length and 3 yards (2.7 m) in circumference at the bottom of the skirt. A belt of cloth of gold, lined with white tabby weave fabric supported his sword scabbard.

== William IV ==
For reasons of time William IV was not invested with a Supertunica, though the ceremony was included in the programme for the coronation. His Supertunica was of cloth of gold decorated with flowers in gold. It measured around 4 feet (1.2 m) in length on the rear and 1.25 yards (1.14 m) on the rear. It had two skirts of 1.5-yard (1.4 m) width each. The skirt was closed with a belt of cloth of gold lined with white tabby weave fabric and with a gold buckle. The belt also supported the king's sword scabbard.

== Victoria ==
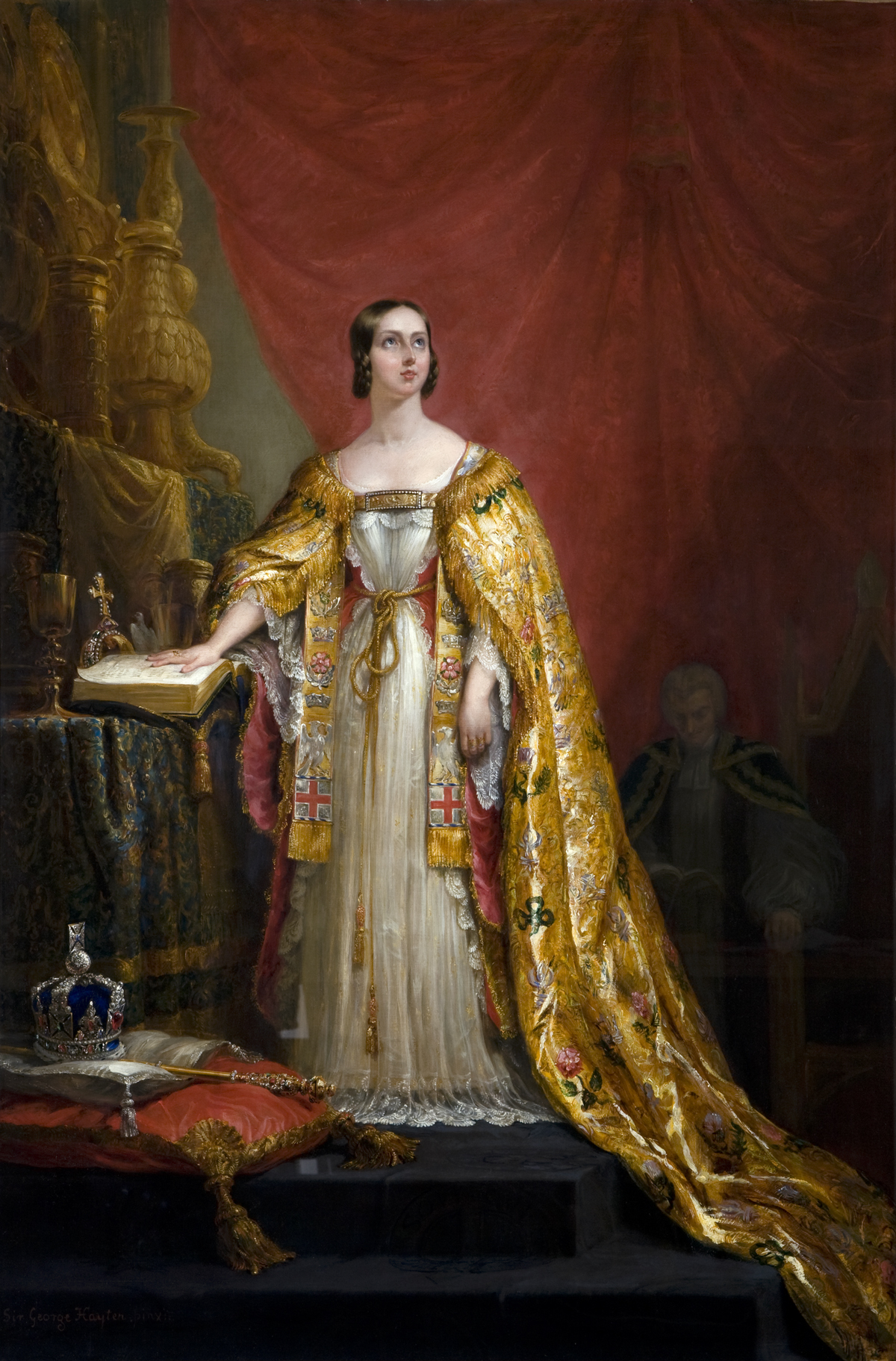
Victoria wearing her Supertunica under a robe

Queen Victoria's Supertunica was 130 centimetres (51 in) long and made on yellow warp with gold thread through it. It is brocaded in silk of different colours with a scroll design using roses, thistles, shamrocks and palm leaves. It is edged with gold lace and gold-coloured spangles. It is lined in red satin. Silk decoration was attached by silver hooks either side of the centre front. The gown opens to the front and had skirts gathered in at the centre of the back. The neck is low and rounded and the sleeves hang to the knee.

== Edward VII ==
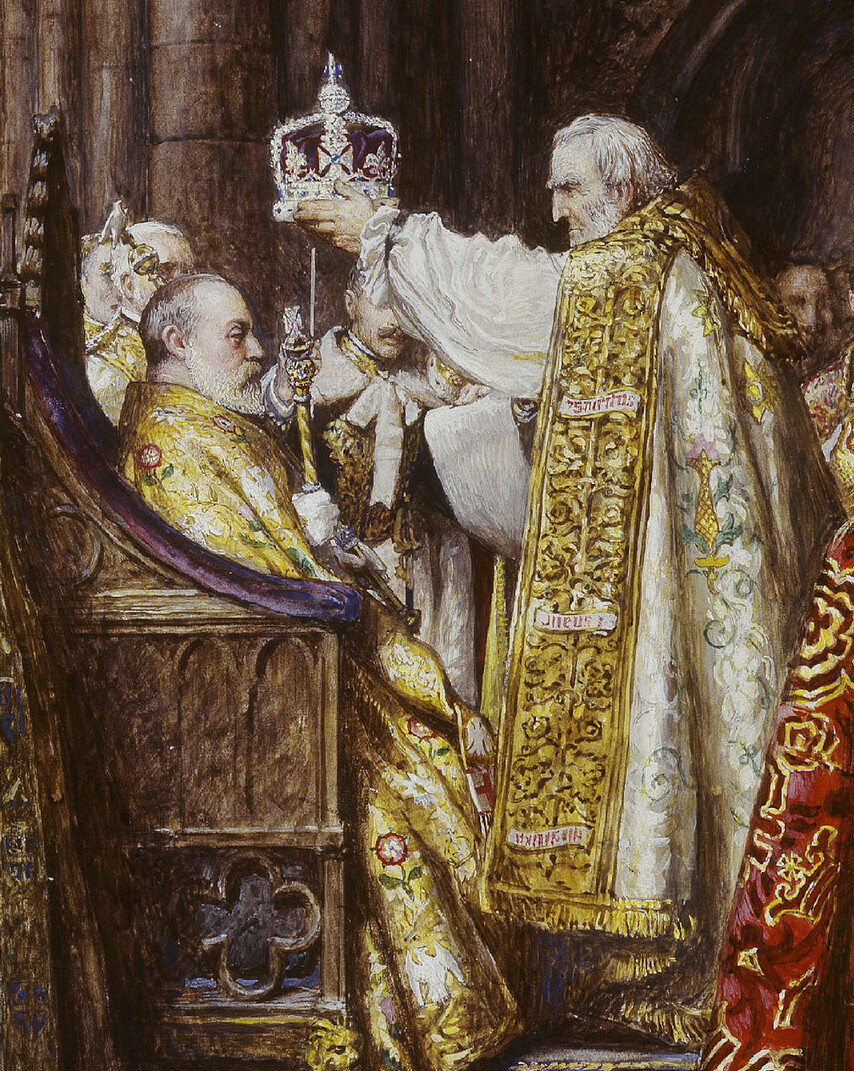
Crowning of Edward VII

Edward VII wore a new Supertunica made from 12 yards (11 m) of cloth of gold (from which his Stole Royal was also made). The cloth of gold was woven by Messrs. Warner of Braintree, Essex, with around 9–10 inches (230–250 mm) made each day. The Supertunica was relatively plain.

== George V ==
The Supertunica is inspired by the robes worn in the early Christian church and Byzantine Empire and features national symbols of the four Home Nations.

It is a full length sleeved coat and belt made of gold-coloured silk and with a front opening, closed by a belt decorated with embroidery. The front is decorated by embroidery on a band either side of the opening. It is lined with red silk. It was made by Wilkinson & Son of Hanover Square.

The belt buckle is made of gold and cast with details of roses, thistles and shamrocks. Its form is similar to that used in the medieval period.
