= Timothy Noad =

English calligrapher, heraldic artist and designer of coins and medals

Timothy Noad MBE
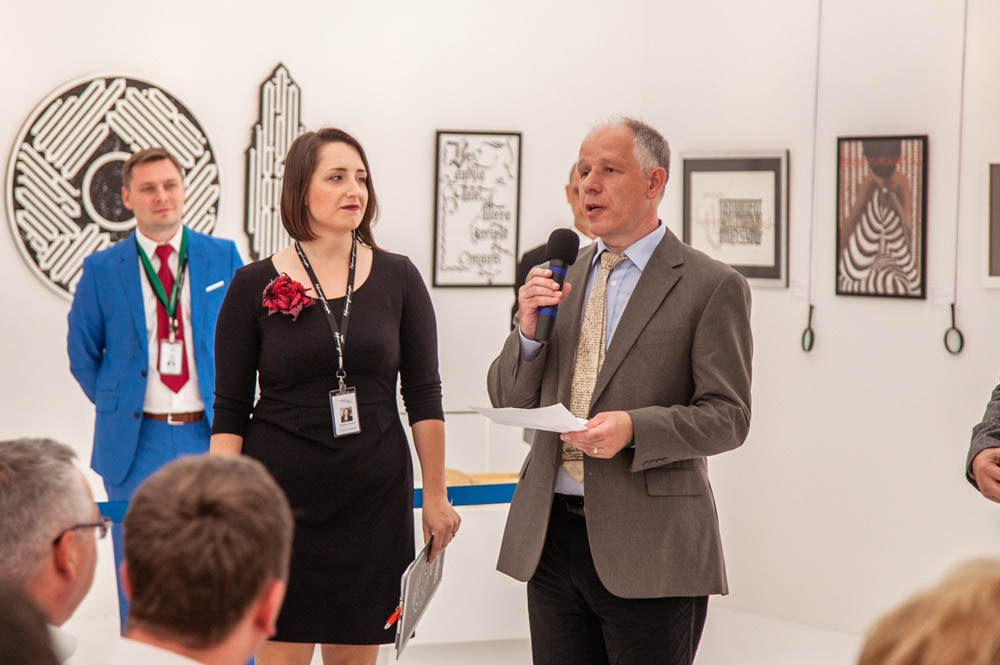
- Noad giving a speech
- Born: Timothy Martin Noad; 1966 (age 59–60); Ickenham, Middlesex, England
- Education: Bishop Ramsey School; Reigate School of Art, East Surrey College; Birkbeck College, University of London; Courtauld Institute of Art
- Occupations: Calligrapher; Heraldic artist Coin and medal designer

Timothy Martin Noad (born 1966) is a British calligrapher, heraldic artist and designer of coins and medals. He has created many designs for Charles III, including the Royal Cypher, several official versions of the Royal Arms, the Stole Royal worn at the Coronation, the title page of the Coronation Roll and the reverse of the Great Seal of the Realm.

Noad trained in Calligraphy, Heraldry and Illumination under Anthony Wood at Reigate School of Art and Design, East Surrey College. Since 1986 he has been working at the College of Arms as a freelance heraldic artist and calligrapher, with the titles "Herald Painter" and "Scrivener". The majority of Noad's work is carried out in traditional techniques using gouache and gold on vellum. He has created Letters patent granting arms to individuals, major corporations and institutions including City of London Livery Companies. Other recipients of his work include members of the British and overseas royal families.

== Royal commissions ==
Noad has undertaken many Royal heraldic commissions, particularly since the accession of Charles III, under the direction of Garter King of Arms at the College of Arms. These include the Royal Cypher, selected by the King from a series of ten designs drawn up by Noad in different styles and featuring the Tudor Crown. Because of the anonymity initially associated with this design, Noad was described in a BBC article as "the country's most widely viewed, but least well-credited, artist".

Charles III signed his name for the first time as ‘Charles R’ on the Accession Documents (the oath to ‘maintain and preserve’ the Church of Scotland) created by Noad at the Accession Council on 10 September 2022.

Noad also designed the crown above the official cypher of Queen Camilla, in collaboration with Professor Ewan Clayton, official versions of the 'Greater' Royal Arms and the Royal Arms for use in Scotland, used by the Crown and for Royal Warrant Holders, alongwith the ‘Lesser’ Royal Arms, used by HM Government. The reverse of the Great Seal of the Realm was executed by the Royal Mint from Noad’s drawing of the Royal Arms.

The Stole Royal, a vestment featuring royal badges and religious emblems, embroidered from Noad’s designs by the Royal School of Needlework, was worn by the King at the Coronation. He created the illuminated title page of the Coronation Roll, showing the Royal Arms and floral emblems of the UK, and described by the King as "Most marvellous illumination work." The subsequent text of the roll was written by calligrapher Stephanie Gill.

== Letters Patent ==
In his role as Scribe and Illuminator to the Crown Office at the House of Lords Noad has undertaken work on many illuminated documents under the Great Seal for presentation to life peers, appointments to the Supreme Court and grants of city status. In 2011 Noad created the Instrument of Consent, signed by Elizabeth II, on the marriage of Prince William to Catherine Middleton. In 2022 he created the last illuminated Letters patent issued by Elizabeth II in celebration of her Platinum Jubilee, awarding Lord Mayoralty to the City of Southampton, and the first issued by Charles III, granting city status to Bangor, Northern Ireland.

He has also written and illuminated many Royal Charters, including those of the Marylebone Cricket Club (MCC) the Worshipful Company of Scientific Instrument Makers and the Worshipful Company of Broderers. In July 2025 Letters Patent were presented to the Worshipful Company of Entrepreneurs at a ceremony at the Mansion House in the City of London.

Noad designed over thirty enamelled copper stall-plates, mainly for the Royal Victorian Order in the Savoy Chapel.

== Coins and medals ==
Noad has designed many coins and medals commissioned and selected in competitions by the Royal Mint Advisory Committee on the Design of Coins, Medals and Seals.

Noad designed the reverse of three gold Sovereign coins: 2002 Golden Jubilee, 2005 St George and the Dragon (the first time this theme had been varied since Pistrucci’s Georgian design) and 2022 Platinum Jubilee.

He also designed the 2013-14 Floral Series of four one pound coins, and 2015 Royal Arms one pound coin. Noad has designed several commemorative coins (now known as "five pound coins", but pre-decimalisation known as Crowns), including in 2021 "Ninety-fifth Birthday of Queen Elizabeth II", in 2023 the Coronation Crown Coin of HM King Charles III and in 2025 the Coat of Arms of HM King Charles III.

== Awards and appointments ==
In 2004 he was appointed Scribe and illuminator to HM Crown Office at the House of Lords and in 2010 Noad was granted the Freedom of the City of London.

In 2025 Noad was appointed a Member of the Order of the British Empire (MBE) in the 2025 Birthday Honours, for Services to Calligraphy, Heraldry and Design. "His exacting aesthetic standards and exquisite artwork, underpinned by great knowledge and intellectual curiosity ensures he is the doyen of heraldic painters." Garter Principal King of Arms, David Vines White said regarding his MBE award.

Noad is a Fellow of the Society of Scribes & Illuminators, an Honoured Fellow of the Calligraphy and Lettering Arts Society and a Full Member of Letter Exchange.
