= Batlló Majesty =

Wooden crucifix in Barcelona, Spain

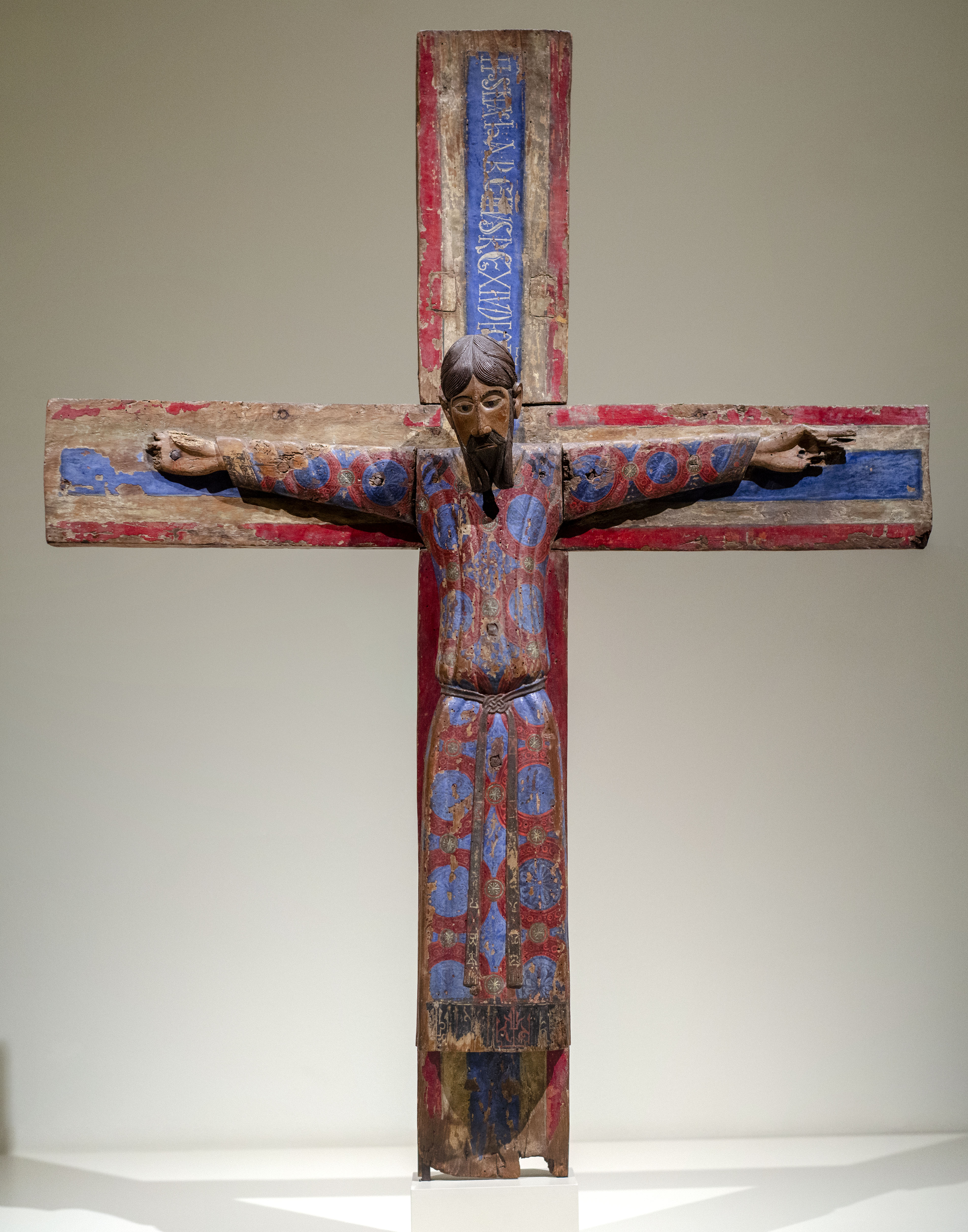
- Artist: Unknown
- Year: mid-12th century
- Type: sculpture
- Medium: Carving in walnut (head and body), willow (right arm), elm (cross upright) and holm oak (cross arms) with polychrome tempera
- Dimensions: 156 cm × 119 cm × 20.5 cm (61 in × 47 in × 8.1 in)
- Location: Museu Nacional d'Art de Catalunya; Barcelona

The Batlló Majesty (Catalan: Majestat Batlló, pronounced [məʒəsˈtad bəˈʎːo]) is a large 12th-century Romanesque wooden crucifix, now in the National Art Museum of Catalonia in Barcelona, Spain. It is one of the most elaborate examples in Catalonia of an image of Christ on the Cross, symbolizing his triumph over death.

== History ==
The Batlló Majesty is a 12th-century Romanesque polychrome wood carving now in the Museu Nacional d'Art de Catalunya in Barcelona, Catalonia. The Batlló Majesty is one of the finest and best-preserved examples of these Catalan sculptures. Carved wooden images were a fundamental element in churches as objects of veneration within the Catholic Church. One of the most elaborate types in Catalonia was the Christ in Majesty, images of Christ on the Cross that symbolize his triumph over death, of which the most outstanding is the Batlló Majesty. The frontal geometric composition of the tunic decorated in circles and floral motifs is reminiscent of the refined Byzantine and Hispano-Moorish fabrics held in such high esteem in the Christian West during this time. The great reference for this type was the Volto Santo in Lucca (Tuscany, Italy), which was regarded as having miraculous origins and was the object of pilgrimage and extraordinary devotion from the end of the eleventh century.

At the end of the 11th century wood sculpture flourished in Catalonia. Carvers used four main formats to represent the Crucifixion:

1. 'Calvaries' where Jesus is represented on the cross with Mary and St. John the Apostle.
2. 'Deposition Tableaux', or figures of the good and bad thieves Mary Magdalene, John the Apostle, Nicodemus, and Joseph of Arimathea
3. 'Majestats' where large wooden crucifixes showed a triumphant Christ wearing a colobium (a long sleeveless tunic).
4. 'Nude Majestats' where Christ is wearing only a perizonium (loincloth).

Wood carving workshops were still active in the 12th century in the western part of the region in the high valleys of the Pyrenees in Catalonia. There are over thirty examples of these large crucifixes, called majestats. The Batlló Majesty has been linked to the region of Olot near Girona. As with much medieval art, its creator is unknown, although a medieval legend credits Nicodemus with producing the sculpture soon after the actual Crucifixion, a pious tradition repeated elsewhere in Europe in connection with similar monumental crosses, like the better known Volto Santo in the church of San Martino, Lucca, to which they bear a notable similarity in appearance and date, these Catalan crucifixes were believed to have miraculous powers.

A large number of majestats still exist from the Catalan provinces of Girona, Barcelona and Lleida, and the French province of Roussillon, such that some scholars believe these are monumental crosses once hung in almost every Romanesque church built in these regions as rood crosses. It is possible that the Majestats were the focus of an important and popular cult veneration in these regions as early as the tenth century. They were normally hung near portals of the churches or altars dedicated to the Savior. Often the backs of the majestats were painted with the Agnus Dei and the Evangelist's symbols suggesting that these crosses were also carried in processions.

Probably it comes from a church in the district of Garrotxa (Girona). It entered the museum's collection donated by Enric Batlló to the Province of Barcelona on a permanent loan, 1914. Its inventory Number is 015937-000.

== Description ==
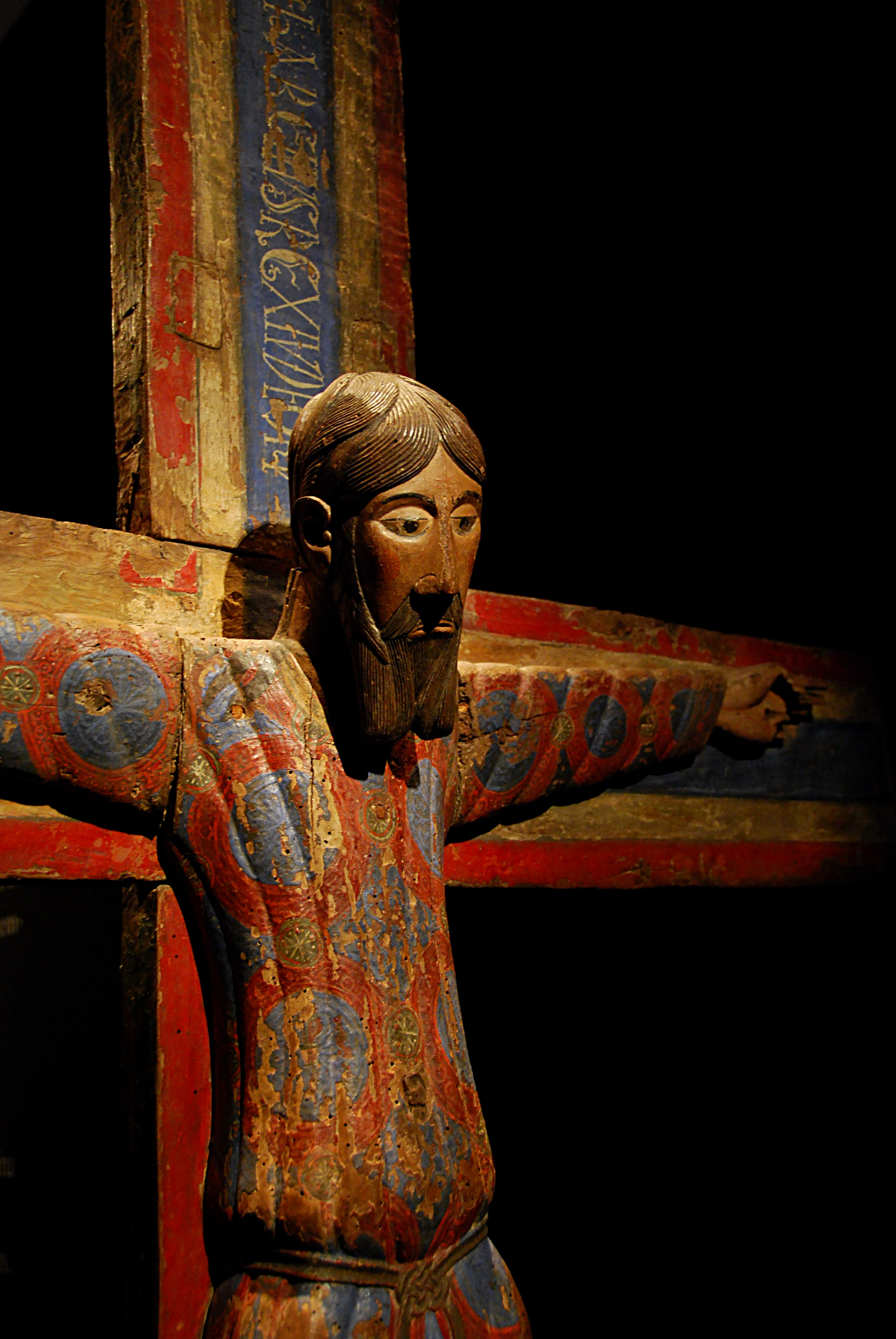
Detail of the corpus

The cross was procured for the museum in 1914 by the collector Enric Batlló, for whom the piece is now named. It was also the same family that commissioned the construction of Casa Batlló in 1877 Barcelona, Catalonia. At the time of its first arrival at the museum, it was covered with a thick coating of varnish that obscured but helped preserve its bright colors, which have now been restored.

Recent studies have revealed the pigments used to produce the colors: the red from cinnabar and the blue from lapis lazuli. Both pigments were very expensive and the sculpture is believed to have come from a studio of some importance, perhaps the studio around the monastery of Ripoll.

== Iconography ==
The Batlló Majesty presents Christ bearing his suffering with noble stoicism. It is a triumphant Christ wearing a colobium, or a long, sleeveless tunic. Although the corners of his mouth turn slightly downward, Christ's open eyes and unfurrowed brow create the impression of a self-possessed impassivity. One of the striking features of the Batlló Majesty compared to others, is the well-conserved polychromy. Christ’s colobium, in imitation of rich oriental silk, is decorated with blue floral designs surrounded by circular red frames embellished with dots and circles. A thin belt with an elaborate interlace knot pulls the tunic in above Christ’s hips, making the fabric above it swell out slightly and curving the path of its flat, wide vertical folds. Such robes, called colobiums are linked with royal and priestly functions and provide a message of strength to the viewing audience. They can be seen as a visualization of image of the Apocalyptic Christ from the Book of Revelation. The iconographic tradition of Jesus in a colobium dates to 586 in a manuscript of the Syriac Gospels called the Rabbula Gospels, written by the monk Rabbula somewhere in Mesopotamia. It is thought that the tradition of depicting Christ in such costume was brought to Catalonia by artisans from Pisa who arrived in 1114 to help Ramon Berenguer III, Count of Barcelona in his conquest of the Balearic Islands.

A Latin inscription above his head reads, "JHS NAZARENUS REX IUDEORUM" ("Jesus of Nazareth King of the Jews”) as in biblical accounts (Matthew 27:37, Mark 15:26, Luke 23:38, John 19:19).

== Chronology ==
The Batlló Majesty is difficult to date, but the inscription on the cross and the painting could be placed in the eleventh century. Other authors date the piece to the twelfth century, based on the painting’s similarity to those in the area of Ripoll. This argument supports the later date of about 1150. The tunic also has an analogy with an Islamic motif abacus of the cloister of the abbey of Saint-Pierre de Moissac, which seems to prove the spread during the Romanesque period.

== See also ==
- List of statues of Jesus
