= Holy Face (Lucca) =

Ancient wooden carving of Christ crucified in Lucca, Italy

Coordinates: 43°50′26″N 10°30′22″E

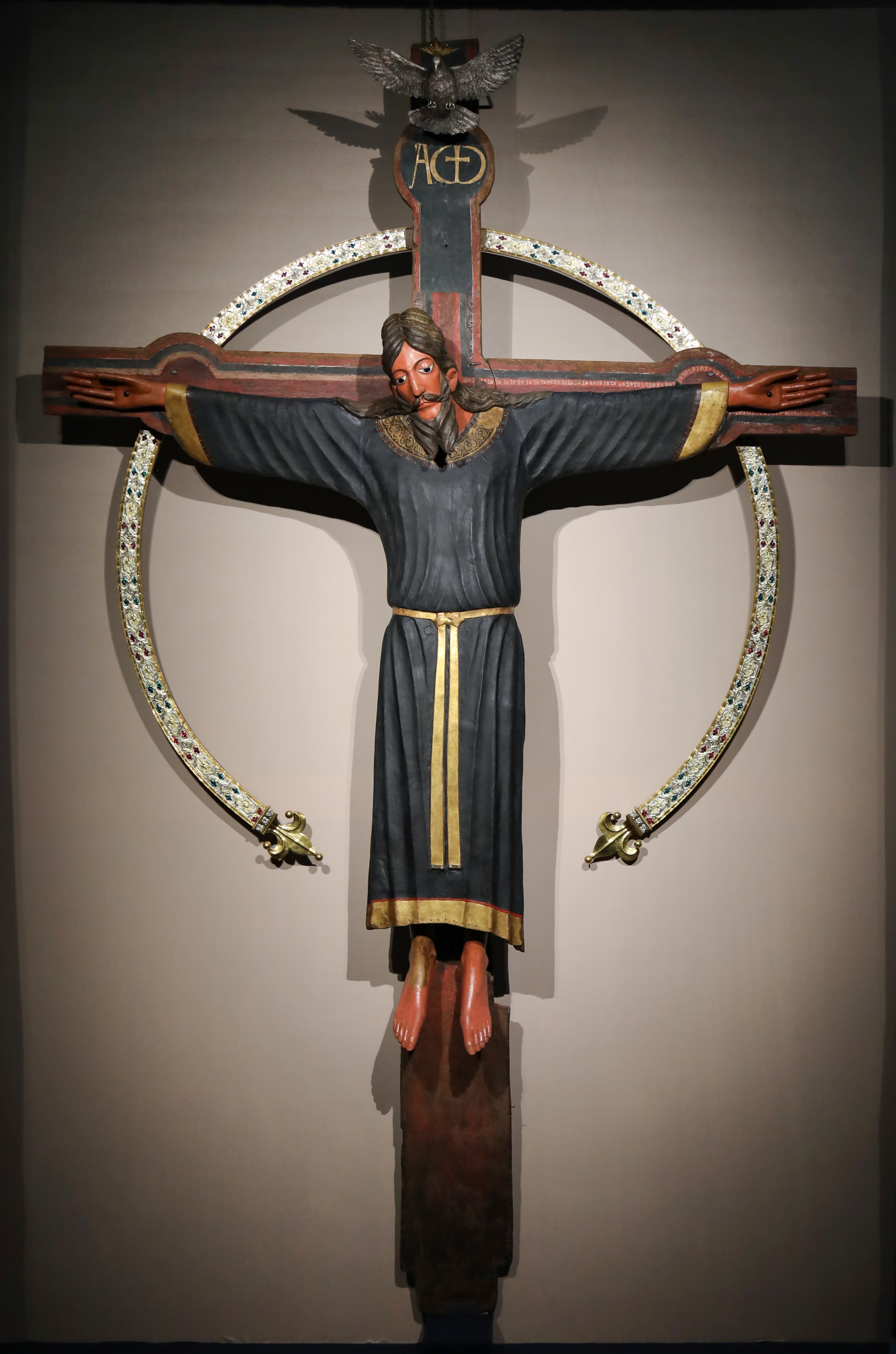
The Volto Santo of Lucca (after its restoration in 2025)

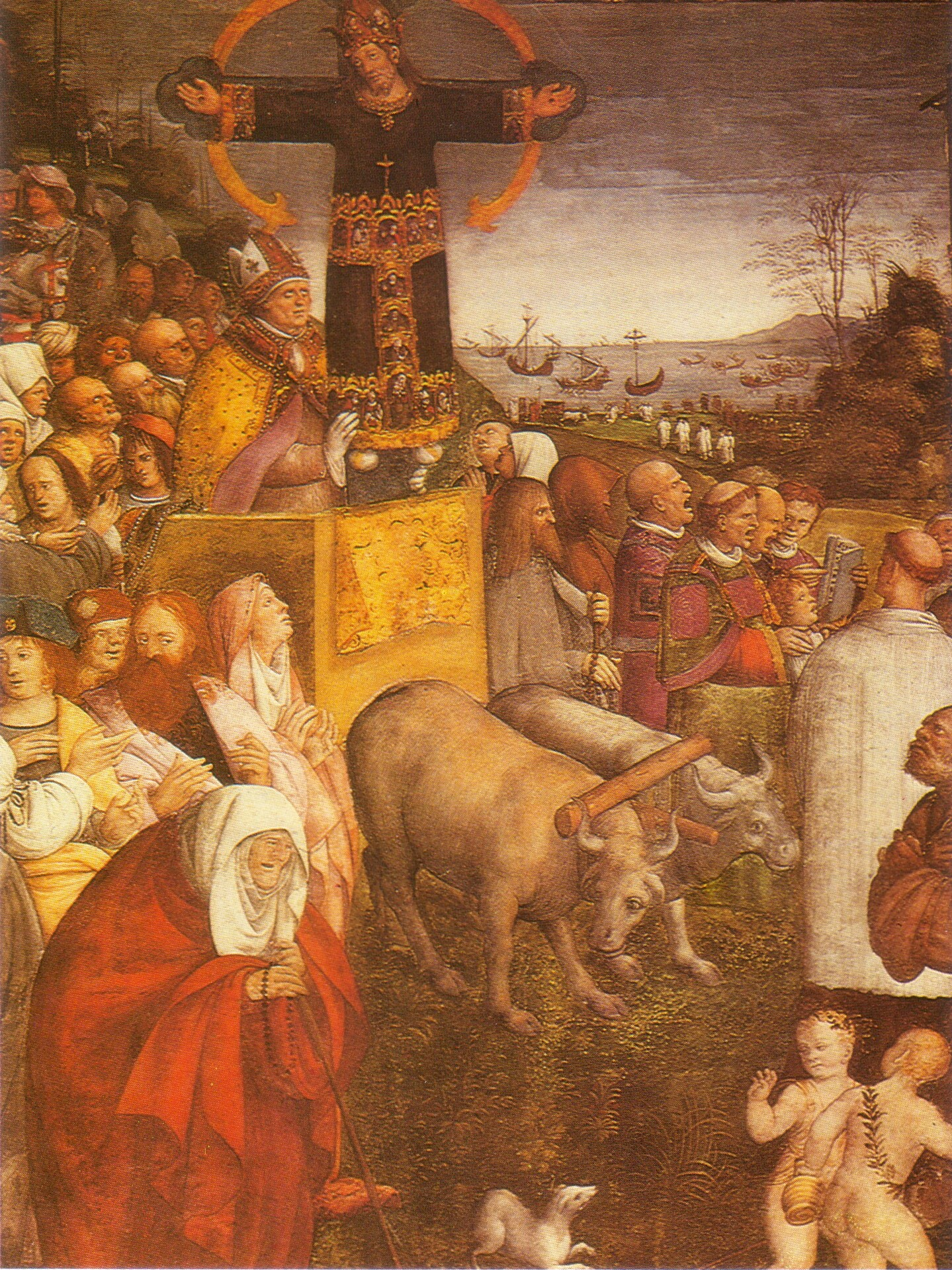
Amico Aspertini, fresco in San Frediano depicting the translation of the ‘'Holy Face’' to Lucca as narrated in the Leboian legend.

Another fresco of the Translation of the Holy Face in the chapel of Villa Buonvisi-Spada in Monte San Quirico, just outside of Lucca

The Holy Face (Italian: Volto Santo) is an 8th-century life-size Crucifix of painted wood in the cathedral of San Martino, Lucca, Italy. Medieval legends state that it was sculpted by Nicodemus who assisted St. Joseph of Arimathea in placing Christ in his tomb after the crucifixion. The same legends placed its miraculous arrival in Lucca to 782.

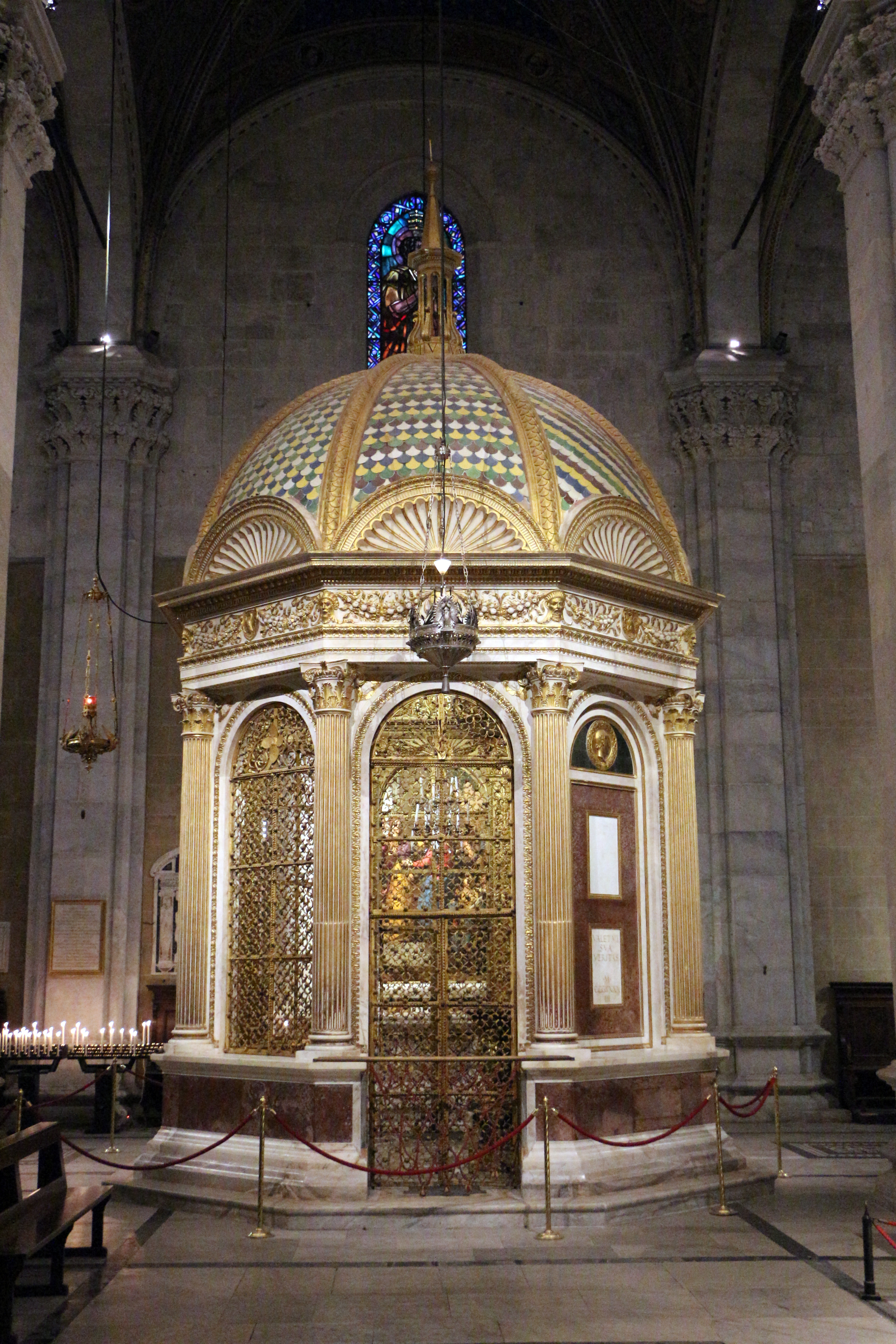
The Tempietto del Volto Santo in Lucca Cathedral by Matteo Civitali, 1482–84

Radiocarbon dating of both wood and canvas places it between 770–880, which corresponds to the Legend of Leobino according to which the Holy Face arrived in Lucca from the region of Judea in 782 (another copy says 742).

The Holy Face is housed in the free-standing octagonal tempietto ("little temple") in the left-hand aisle of Lucca Cathedral. The sacristy of Carrara marble was built for the purpose in 1484 by Matteo Civitali, the sculptor-architect of Lucca.

Copies of a similar size –the Volto Santo measures eight-foot-tall (2.4 m)– from the 12th century are found widely spread across Europe. These include the Cross of Imervard in Brunswick Cathedral (Braunschweig, Germany), the Holy Face of Sansepolcro (Sansepolcro, Italy) and possibly the Batlló Crucifix of Barcelona, Spain. The Holy Face is also depicted on a 14th-cent Gothic fresco in a Lutheran church in Štítnik, Slovakia.

== History ==
In the traditional account, the year 782 marks the arrival of the Holy Face in the Basilica di San Frediano; its transferral to the cathedral, justified by a miraculous translation in the Latin legend, De inventione, revelatione ac translatione Sanctissimi Vultus (or Leggenda di Leobino) may be connected with the episcopacy of Anselmo da Baggio (1060–70), who presented it at the consecration of the new Romanesque cathedral, 6 October 1070. Insistent details of the hagiographic legend (see below) also suggest that the image had previously been at Luni in Liguria, the former see of a bishopric and the early commercial rival of Lucca. Luni was a Byzantine possession that had been sacked by Saracens, disputed between Byzantines and Lombards, and reduced to a village by the eighth century.

The sculpture bears no stylistic relationship to Lombard sculpture of the tenth or eleventh century, however. The iconography of a completely robed crucified Christ wearing a colobium — an ankle-length tunic — is more familiar in the East than in the West, although a near life-size Crucifixion, carved in the round, is contrary to Byzantine norms. Life-size Crucifixes were more common in Germany from the late eleventh century, following the Gero Cross of Cologne Cathedral of about 970, which seems to have been the prototype. The long robe may be a Byzantine influence, although many Western examples also exist, in Ottonian illuminated manuscripts and other media. The belt of the Holy Face is unprecedented in a Crucifixion from either East or West.

In Lucca, an annual candlelit procession on 13 September, the Luminara, is devoted to the Volto Santo, the eve of religious celebrations on the following day. The procession, which today no longer includes the sculpture as in the past, walks to the cathedral from the Basilica of San Frediano, where a fresco cycle commemorates the legend of Nicodemus' sculpting the image from cedar of Lebanon, during which, having completed all but the face, Nicodemus slept, awaking to find the Holy Face completed by an angel. In Eastern Christianity, similar legends accrue around icons said to be acheiropoieta: sanctissimum Vultum non sua sed arte divina disculpsit, according to the Latin legend: "the most holy Face, sculpted not by his craft but divine."

Discovered in a cave in the Holy Land by bishop Gualfredo, who was guided by a revelatory dream, the image was carried first to the Tuscan port of Luni in a boat without sails or crew. But the men of Luni, when they tried to board the boat, found that it retreated miraculously from their grasp. Warned by an angel in a revelatory dream that the Holy Face had arrived in Luni, Johannes, bishop of Lucca, with his clerics and a great crowd of Lucchesi, came to Luni, bade a stop to the attempts to retrieve the boat and, by calling upon God, found that the ship came miraculously to Johannes and opened to him its gangplank. When the people saw the Holy Face they wept tears of joy and cried Gloria in excelsis.

Once ashore, the legend brings the image to Lucca in a cart pulled by oxen with no driver, in a further miraculous demonstration of the "rightness" of its possession by the city of Lucca, and having been deposited in the church of San Frediano, it is miraculously translated to the church of San Martino, which was interpreted as the rationale for choosing this church as the cathedral, the bishop's seat. Thus the possession of the image by Lucca rather than Luni, and its location in its rightful church, were both justified by legend.

Its popularity was expressed in copies as well as legends, to satisfy the pilgrims who made the cathedral of Lucca the goal of their voyages from all parts of Europe. Like other famous relics or images, such as the Virgin's Belt of Prato to this day, it appears to have often only been available to view on certain appointed days in the year, and at least some of the time wore rich textile clothing as well as the wooden carved robe. "By the face of Lucca" was the 'customary oath' of William II of England. The Holy Face appears on medieval Luccan coins. Dante mentions the Volto Santo in his Inferno, Canto XXI, where a demon cries:

Qui non ha luogo il Volto Santo!
qui si nuota altrimenti che nel Serchio.

Translation:

Here the Holy Face has no place!
Here you swim otherwise than in the Serchio.

The last line alludes to swimming in boiling pitch, rather than in the river Serchio which runs through Lucca.

== Legend of the fiddler ==
A legend of a fiddler devotee of the statue receiving a shoe in precious metal, with a number of variants in the story, is first recorded from the 12th century. Typically the statue allows the shoe to drop, or kicks it over to the fiddler (despite, in some versions, a nail through it). The fiddler may be a poor pilgrim, or a devotee who is rewarded for frequently playing in front of the statue; or he may only take up the fiddle after his good luck. The slipper may be filled with gold coins, and the slipper may be returned by the fiddler and the gift repeated. The fiddler may be tried for theft of the slipper, but escape condemnation. The legend also became part of the cult of Wilgefortis, the alter ego of the Holy Face.

Images showing the legend normally feature the fiddler playing beneath the statue, which is placed (as apparently in reality) above an altar. The statue seems to be wearing actual clothes—like other much venerated statues, it seems to have been dressed in "festive clothes", at least some of the time. On the altar are the slipper, and a chalice below one of the statue's feet. This also reflects the medieval arrangement, where a fixture shaped like a chalice was placed to receive offerings, with a tube that carried the offerings down to a strongbox below the altar.

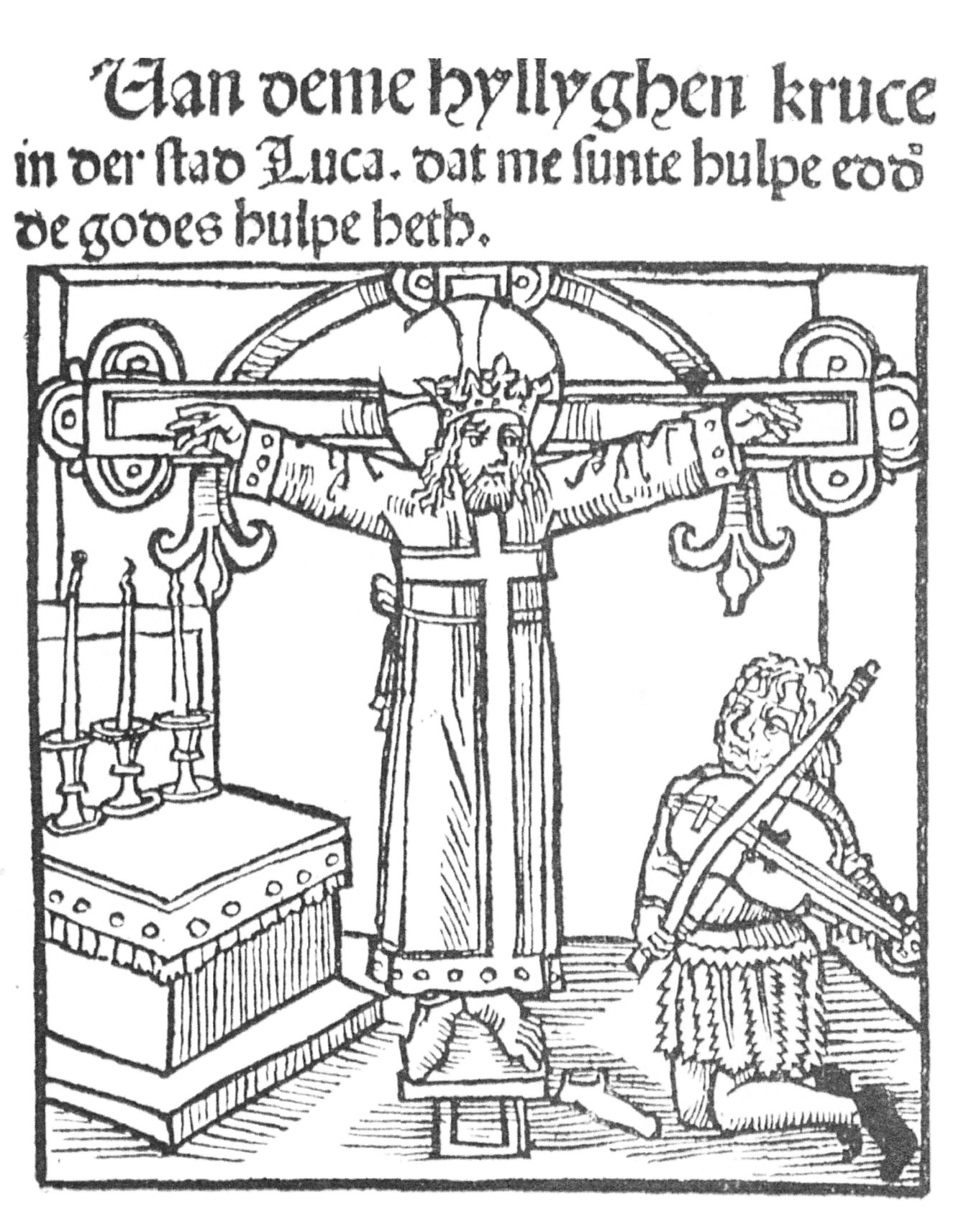
Northern German woodcut of "so-called God's help" in the Lübeck Passion, 1492

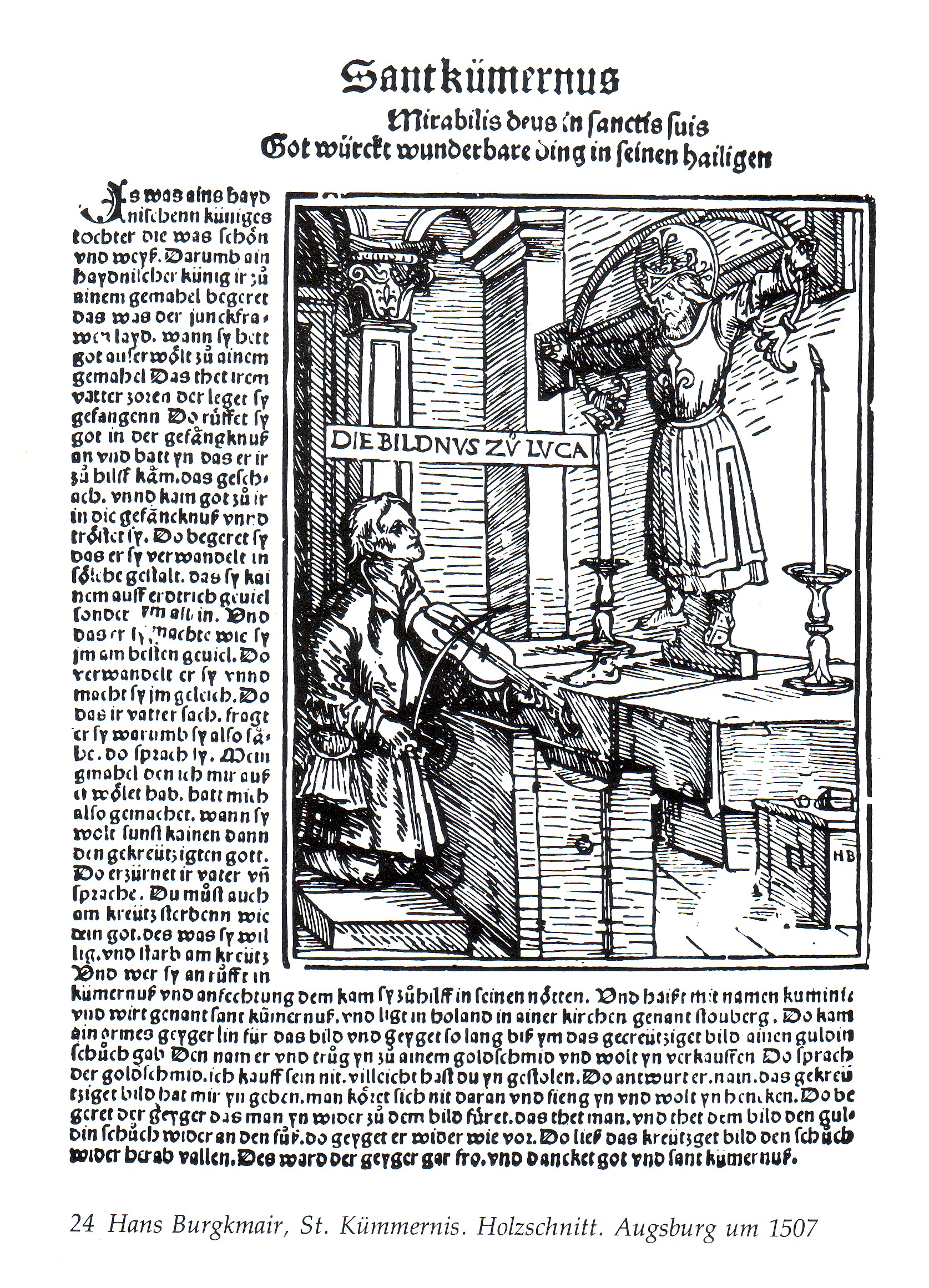
Sant Kümmernis, ″die Bildnus zu Luca", and the fiddler, woodcut by Hans Burgkmair, 1507

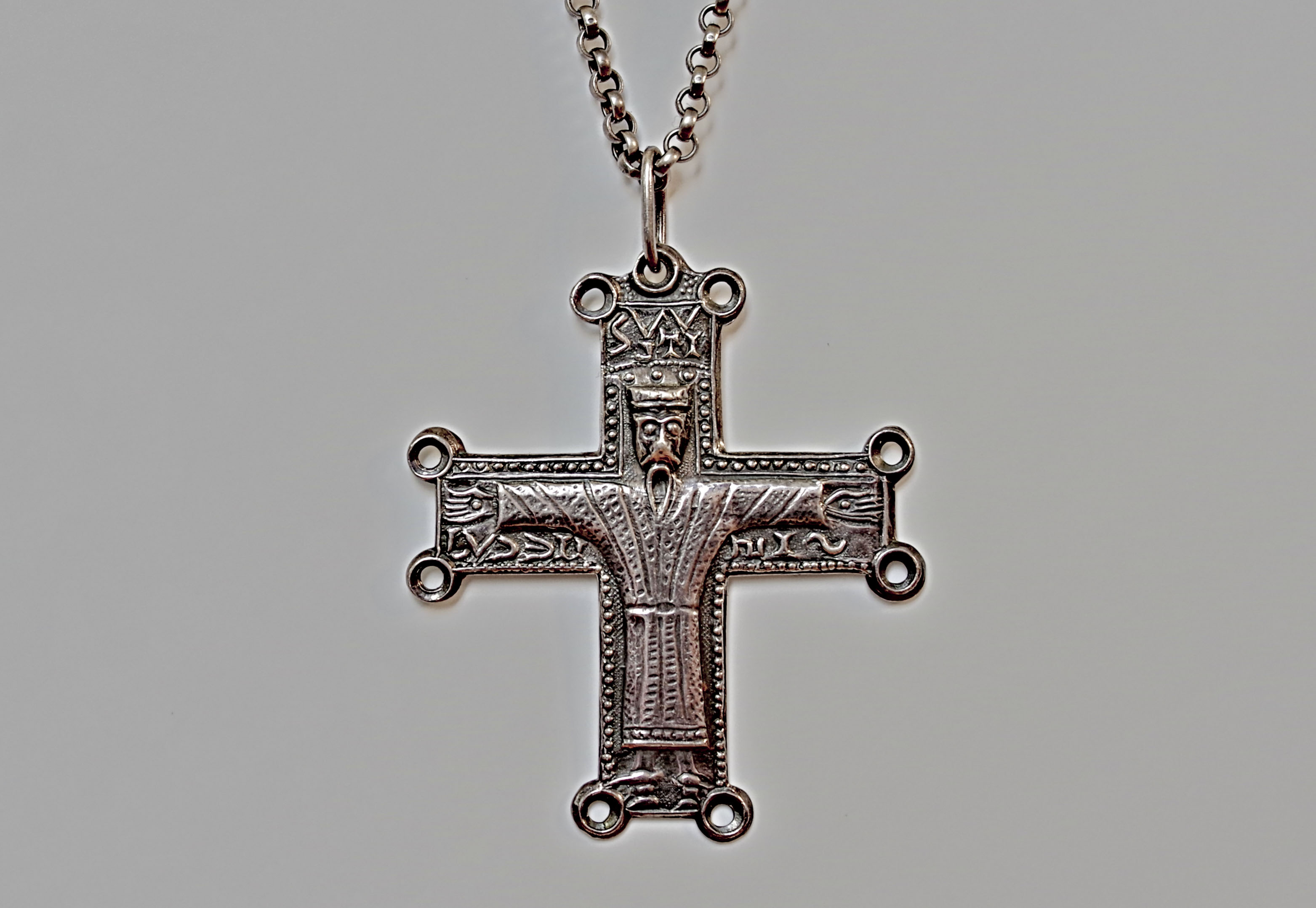
Pilgrimage marks from Selja in Norway

== Wilgefortis ==
At the end of the fourteenth century, such a Holy Face inspired miracles and veneration in the Low Countries, Bavaria and the Tyrol, though its connection with Lucca had been forgotten. The long robe worn by the statue appeared to signify that the figure was of a woman. To account for the beard, a legend developed of a young noblewoman who miraculously grew a beard in order to maintain her virginity. Her father, often said to be the king of Portugal, promised her in marriage to another pagan king. Wilgefortis, who had taken a vow of perpetual virginity, prayed to be made repulsive to her future husband. As a result, she grew a long, flowing beard. In a rage, her father had her crucified. Wilgefortis became a popular figure in folk Catholicism. As a result, she assumed various local names including Kümmernis in Germany or Sainte Débarras in France, and was duly entered in the Martyrologium Romanum in 1583, retaining a devoted following as late as the nineteenth century.

== See also ==
- Holy Face of Jesus
- List of statues of Jesus

== Literature ==
- Baracchini, C. and A. Caleca. Il Duomo di Lucca, Lucca 1973, pp. 14–15 (Italian).
- Friesen, Ilse E. The Female Crucifix: Images of St. Wilgefortis Since the Middle Ages. Waterloo, Ontario: Laurier University Press, 2001.
- Guerra, Giulio Dante. "La 'leggenda' del Volto Santo di Lucca". In: Cristianità, 10, August–September 1982, pp. 88–89.
- Guidi, Pietro (1932). "La Data Nella Leggenda di Leobino". Archivio Storico Italiano (in Italian). 90 (Serie 7, Vol. 18) (4 (344)): 153–164. JSTOR 26241065.
- Pertusi, Agostino, and F. Pertusi Pucci. "Il Crocifisso ligneo del Monastero di S. Croce e Nicodemo di Bocca di Magra". In: Rivista dell'Istituto Nazionale d'Archeologia e Storia dell'Arte, 1979, pp. 3–51 (Italian).
- Schiller, Gertrud. Iconography of Christian Art, Vol. 2: The Passion of Jesus Christ. Translation from German by Janet Seligman. Greenwich, CT: New York Graphic Society, 1972, pp. 144–145, 472–473.
- Schnürer, Gustav, and Joseph M. Ritz. St. Kümmernis und Volto Santo, Düsseldorf 1934 (German).
