= Harold Campbell (courtier) =

British sailor, civil servant, and courtier

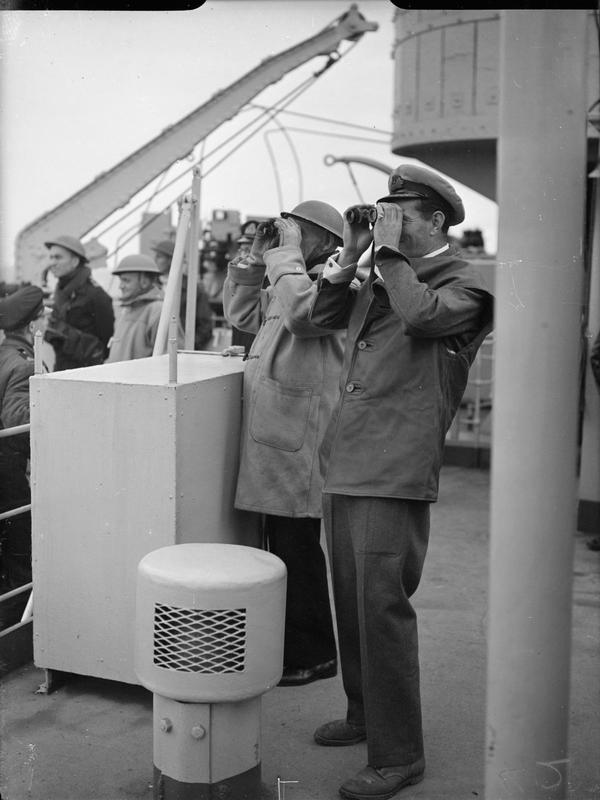
Campbell at the D-Day landings in 1944

Captain Sir Harold George Campbell GCVO DSO (6 April 1888 – 9 June 1969) was a British sailor, civil servant and courtier who served as equerry to King George VI (1936–52) and then to Queen Elizabeth II 1952–54.

Campbell was born in Kensington, the son of Henry Alexander Campbell of Renfrewshire and Ivy Valery Clavering, daughter of Sir Henry Clavering, 10th Baronet. While serving with the Royal Navy in the First World War, Campbell was awarded the Distinguished Service Order for his actions during the Zeebrugge Raid. He commanded the Daffodil, a former Mersey Ferry boat, in the raid when the old armoured cruiser HMS Vindictive (1897) was struggling to get into the mole face. Under heavy fire from the enemy, Campbell used the Daffodil to push the Vindictive's bows into the mole. As a war historian remarked later of Campbell's skill, "Only a fine seaman could have manoeuvred a ferry boat with such wonderful precision at a moment of such confusion."

Campbell was Private Secretary to the Duke of York 1933–36, and Deputy Comptroller in 1936. When the Duke became King, Campbell was appointed to his Household as an equerry and Groom of the Robes to Queen Elizabeth, 1937–54. From 1954 until his death Campbell was Extra equerry.

He was made a CVO in 1935, promoted to KCVO on 2 June 1943, and to GCVO on 16 November 1953.
