= Cloth of gold =

Rich Medieval fabric woven with gold thread or a combination of gold and silk

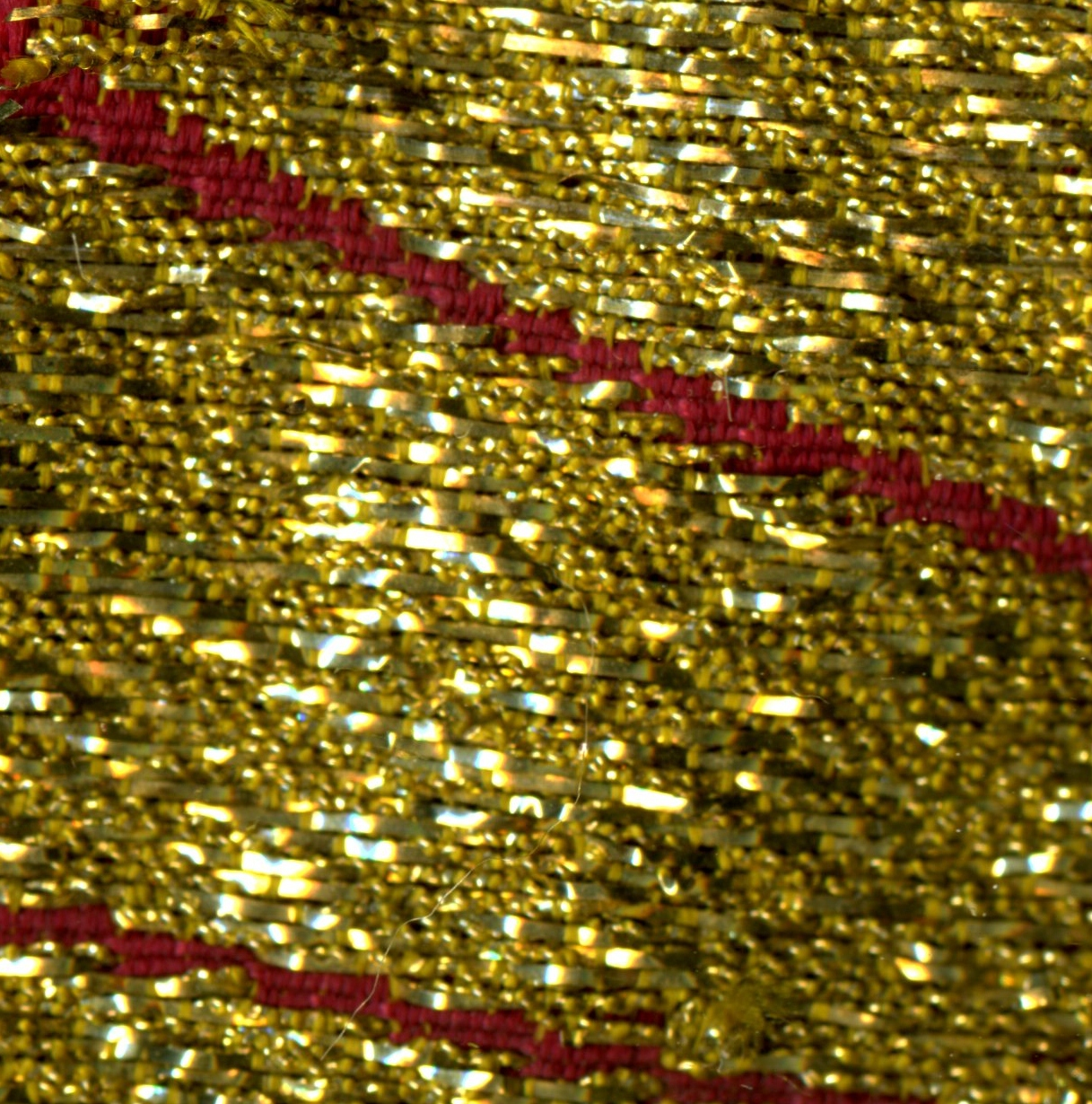
Cloth of gold woven with golden strips

Cloth of gold or gold cloth (Latin: Tela aurea) is a fabric woven with a gold-wrapped or spun weft—referred to as "a spirally spun gold strip". In most cases, the core yarn is silk, wrapped (filé) with a band or strip of high content gold. In rarer instances, fine linen and wool have been used as the core.

== History ==
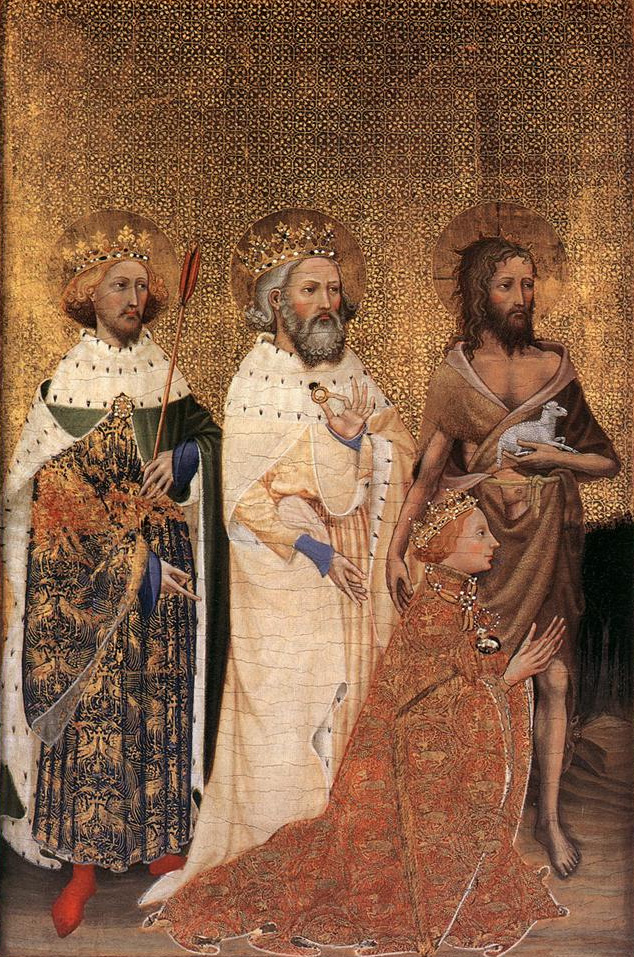
The left inside panel of the Wilton Diptych (c. 1395–1399) shows a kneeling Richard II of England wearing a robe of cloth of gold and red vermilion.

While cloth of gold has been popular for ecclesiastical use for many centuries, the earliest mentions of the use of cloth of gold are found in Vedic texts of South Asia. Earlier uses can be traced back to Central and South Asia where ancient Irani peoples have mentioned use of a fabric woven with gold. In eastern Asia, Chinese weavers had also used the technique of weaving gold into silk fabrics to create designs. Under Henry VII of England, its use was reserved to royalty and higher levels of nobility. Cloth of gold continued to be the fabric of choice for royalty, nobility and the elite across the globe for centuries as a show of wealth and power. It is also used today by companies such as Charvet for neckwear.

Few extant examples have survived in Roman provincial tombs. Later producers of cloth of gold include the Byzantine Empire and Medieval Italian weavers, particularly in Genoa, Venice and Lucca. Dating from the 1460s the Waterford cloth-of-gold vestments are made from Italian silk woven in Florence. The panels were embroidered in Bruges which was the centre of the medieval embroidery industry. A similar cloth of silver was also made. It is still made in India and Europe today.

=== Use at Coronation of King Charles III ===
King Charles III re-used the Supertunica made from cloth of gold at his coronation on 6 May 2023. The full-length, sleeved coat is an important historic textile from the royal collection, weighing around two kilograms. It has been worn at several previous coronations in the United Kingdom.

== Other ==
- Cloth of gold is not to be confused with various goldwork embroidery techniques that date back to antiquity, though the type of goldwork thread called "passing" is identical to the weft thread of cloth of gold.
- Most modern metallic fabrics made in the West are known as lamé.
- Cloth of gold is a familiar name occasionally applied to the venomous Conus textile species of cone shell.
- Tilsent is a luxurious silken cloth interwoven with flattened threads of gold or silver.

== Images ==
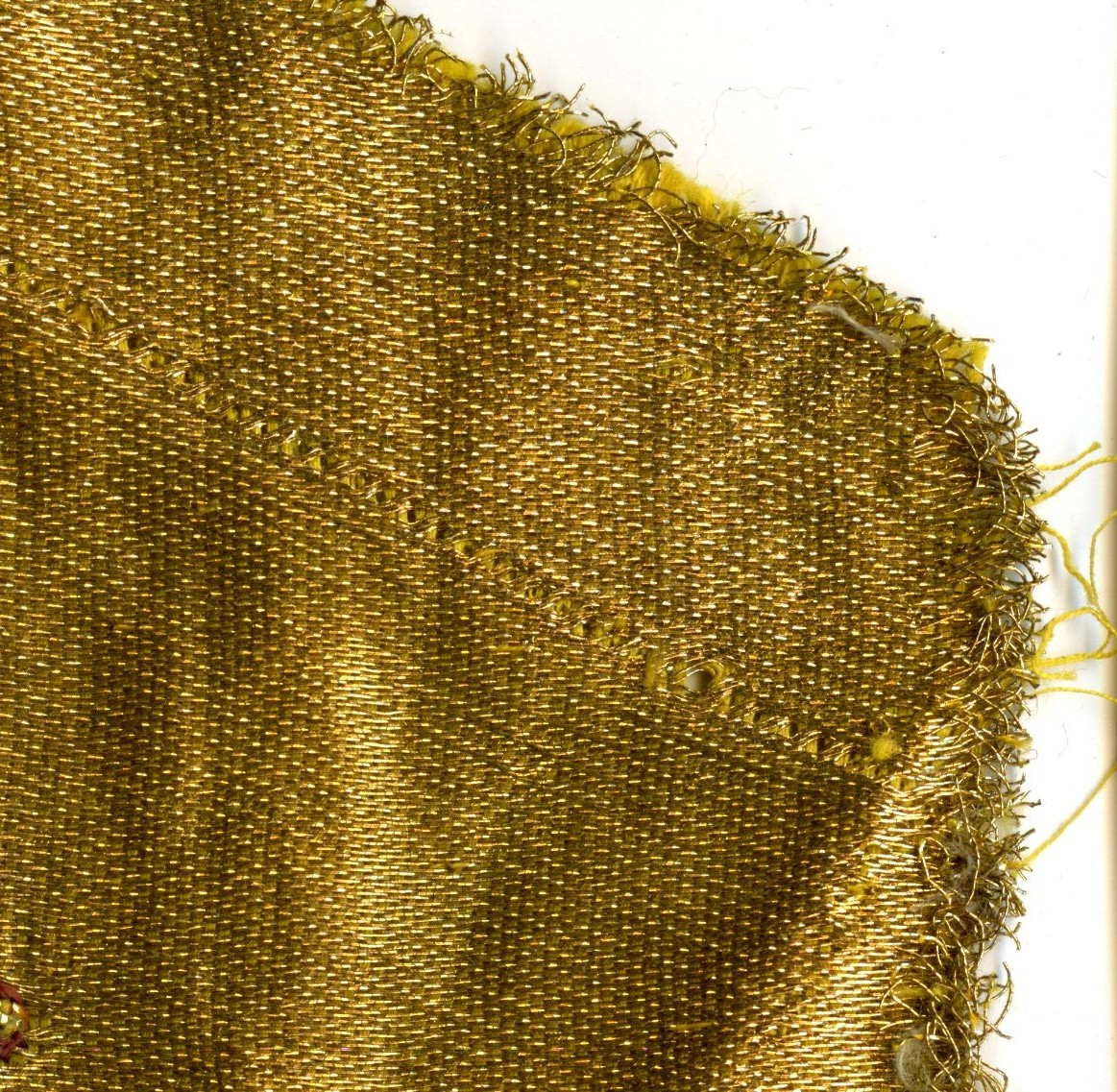
satin-weave cloth of gold, front

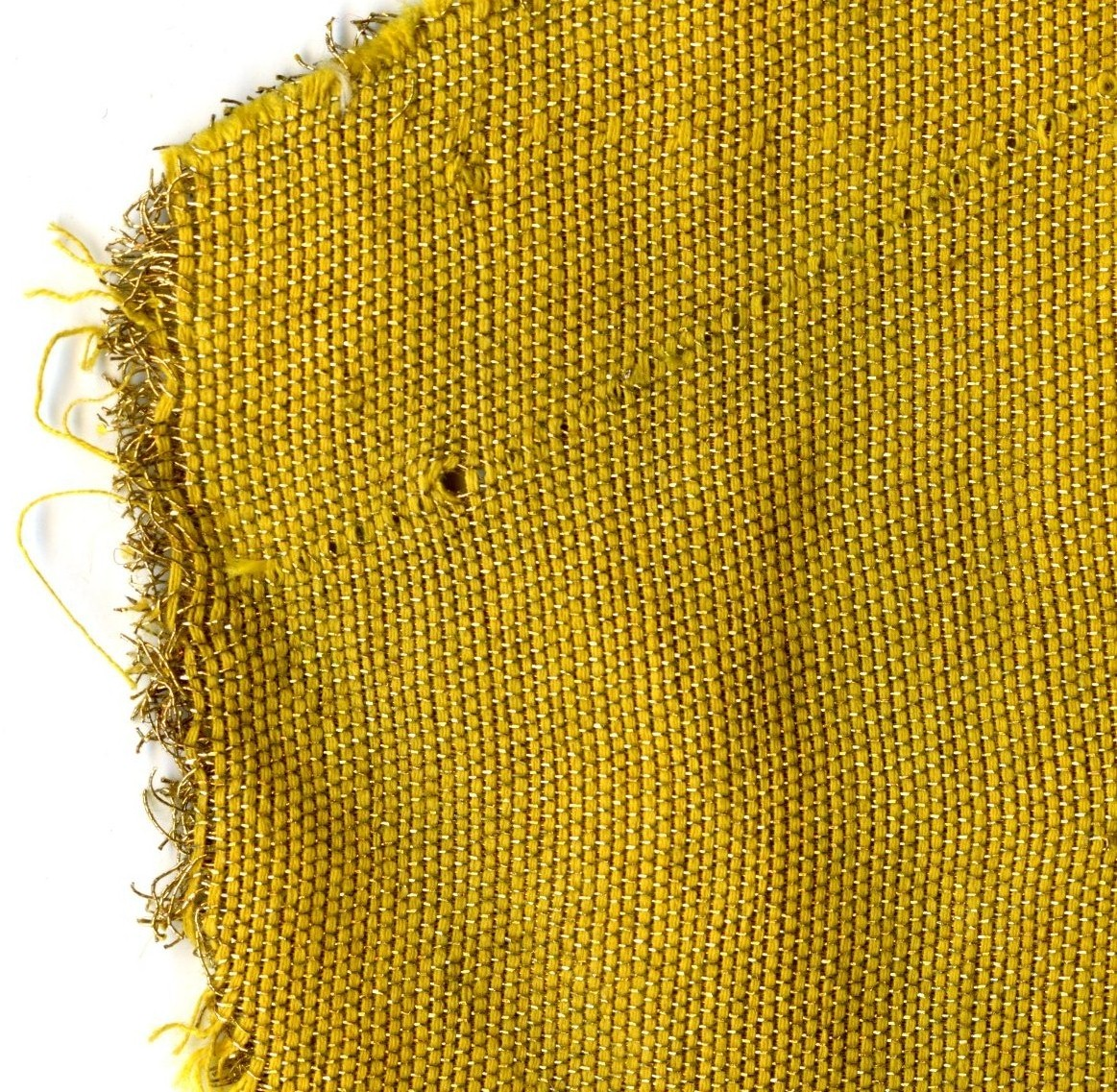
satin-weave cloth-of-gold, back

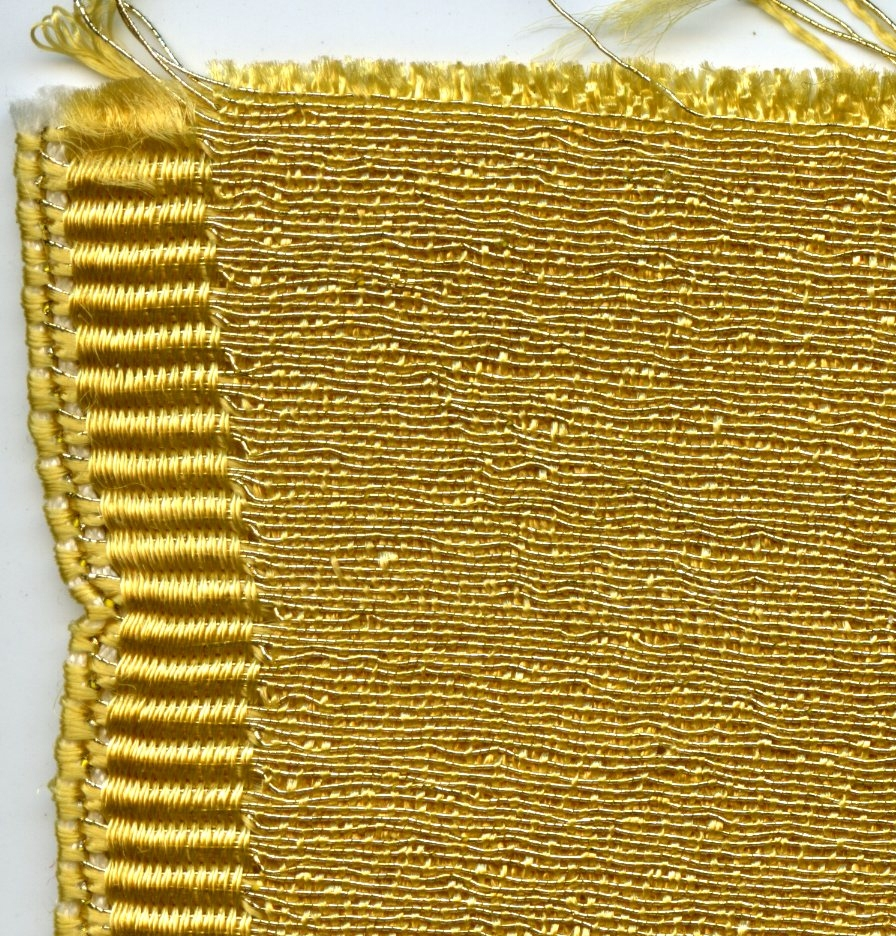
twill-weave cloth-of-gold, front

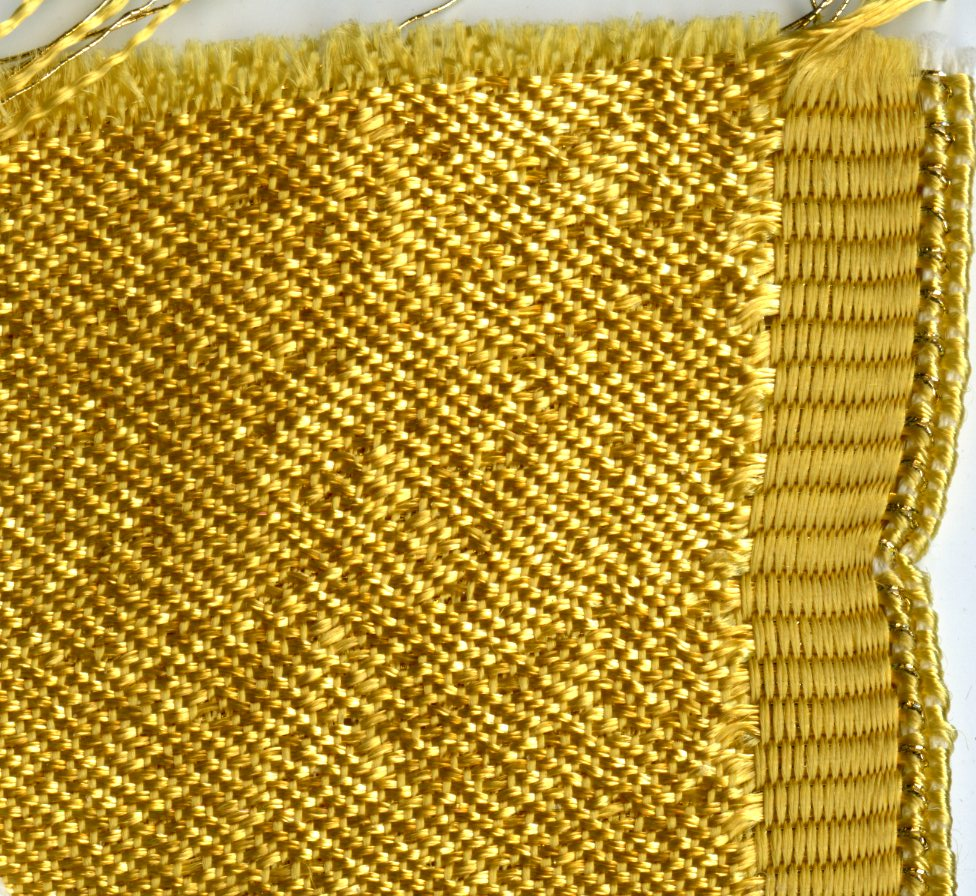
twill-weave cloth-of-gold, back

== See also ==
- Field of the Cloth of Gold
- Samite
