= Groom of the Robes =

Groom of the Robes is an office in the Royal Household of the Sovereign of England (later Great Britain, ultimately the United Kingdom). In 1953, the Groom of the Robes to Elizabeth II had the task of bringing forward the robes and other items of ceremonial clothing worn by the monarch at various points in the coronation service, ready to hand them over to the Mistress of the Robes and the Lord Great Chamberlain (who assisted The Queen in putting them on) and to receive and remove those which were no longer required.

The post was in abeyance after 1954, although an Equerry was usually designated 'Acting Groom of the Robes' on occasions (such as the State Opening of Parliament) when robes are worn. It returned to active use for the Coronation of Charles III in 2023 when Lieutenant Colonel Jonathan Thompson was appointed.

== List of Grooms of the Robes ==
(incomplete)

- Thomas Purcell
- Piers Curteys
- John Hart

=== Henry VIII ===
- Richard Cecil 1530
- John Copinger
- William Sharington 1540–1541
- Thomas Sternhold 1500–1549
- Sir John Gates

=== Edward VI ===
- Robert Robotham

=== William IV ===
- Lord Adolphus FitzClarence 1830–1833

=== Victoria ===
- Francis Seymour 1837–1870
- Henry Erskine 1870–1901

=== Edward VII ===
- Henry Erskine 1901–1910

=== George V ===
- Henry Erskine 1910–1920
- Montague Eliot 1920–1936

=== George VI ===
- Sir Harold Campbell 1937–1952

=== Elizabeth II ===
- Sir Harold Campbell 1952–1954

=== Charles III ===
- Lt Col Jonathan Thompson 2023–present

== See also ==
- Groom of the Stool
