= Colobium sindonis =

Garment worn by British monarchs during coronation

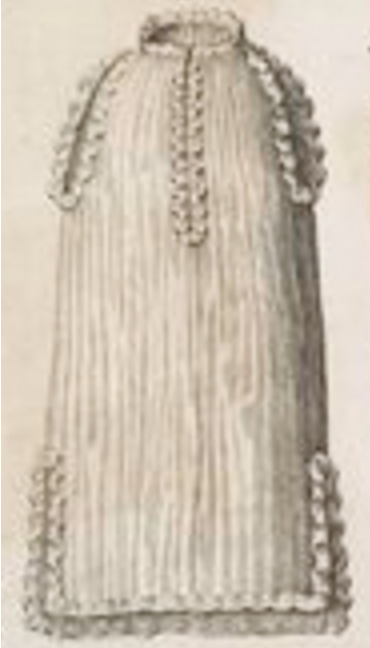
Detail showing the colobium sindonis from an engraving by Francis Sandford depicting the regalia for the coronation of King James II.

The colobium sindonis (Latin for "shroud tunic") is a simple sleeveless white linen shift worn by British monarchs during part of the coronation service. It symbolises divesting oneself of all worldly vanity and standing bare before God. The monarch is continually robed and disrobed during the ceremony, according to ancient custom.

Following the anointing in the coronation service, the colobium sindonis is placed over the monarch's clothes, and then the supertunica, a long robe of gold brocade, is placed over that. Wearing these garments, the monarch is invested with the regalia, crowned and enthroned. Both garments are removed before the final procession out of the abbey. Both of these robes are of very ancient design; those used by the medieval kings of England were said to have been used by King Edward the Confessor at his coronation in 1043, however these were destroyed by the Parliamentarians after the English Civil War. Up until George V, a new colobium sindonis was usually made for each coronation; however, Charles III wore his great grandfathers George V colobium sindonis for his coronation in 2023.
