= Master of the Robes =

Office within the British Royal Household

The Master of the Robes is an office in the British Royal Household. He is responsible for the King's robes at times such as a coronation, the annual Order of the Garter service and the State Opening of Parliament. Since the reign of Edward VII, the office has only been filled for coronations (note, the office is not allocated during the reign of a queen regnant). Below is a list of known office holders:

== Henry VII ==
- 1496: Sir Edward Burton

== James I ==
- 1603-1612: Roger Aston.
- 1617–1625: Christopher Villiers

== Charles, Prince of Wales, later Charles I ==
- 1611–1622: Robert Carey
- 1622–1628: Spencer Compton, Lord Compton
- 1628–1649: ?

== Charles II ==
- 1660–1662: Henry Cavendish, Viscount Mansfield
- 1662–1678: Laurence Hyde
- 1678-1679: Sidney Godolphin
- 1679–1685: Henry Sydney

== James II ==
- 1685–1687: Arthur Herbert
- 1687–1688: Lord Thomas Howard

== William III ==
- 1690–1695: William Nassau de Zuylestein
- 1695–1701: Arnold van Keppel
- 1701: Cornelius Nassau

== George I ==
- 1714–1726: William Cadogan
- 1727: George Cholmondeley, Viscount Malpas

== George II ==
- 1727–1757: Augustus Schutz
- 1757–1760: Edward Finch

== George III ==
- 1760–1791: James Brudenell
- 1791–1808: Sir James Peachey
- 1808–1809: William Harcourt
- 1809–1812: Henry Sedley
- 1812–1820: Charles Nassau Thomas

== George IV ==
- 1820–1830: Lord Francis Conyngham

== William IV ==
- 1830: Sir Charles Pole, 1st Baronet
- 1830–1837: Sir George Seymour

== Edward VII ==
- 1902: Charles Harbord, 5th Baron Suffield

== George V ==
- 1911: Victor Spencer, 1st Viscount Churchill

== Edward VIII ==
- 1936: Edward Colebrooke, 1st Baron Colebrooke

== George VI ==
- 1936: Post vacant

== Charles III ==
- 2022: Post vacant
