= List of British royal consorts =

Spouses of British monarchs

British royal consorts

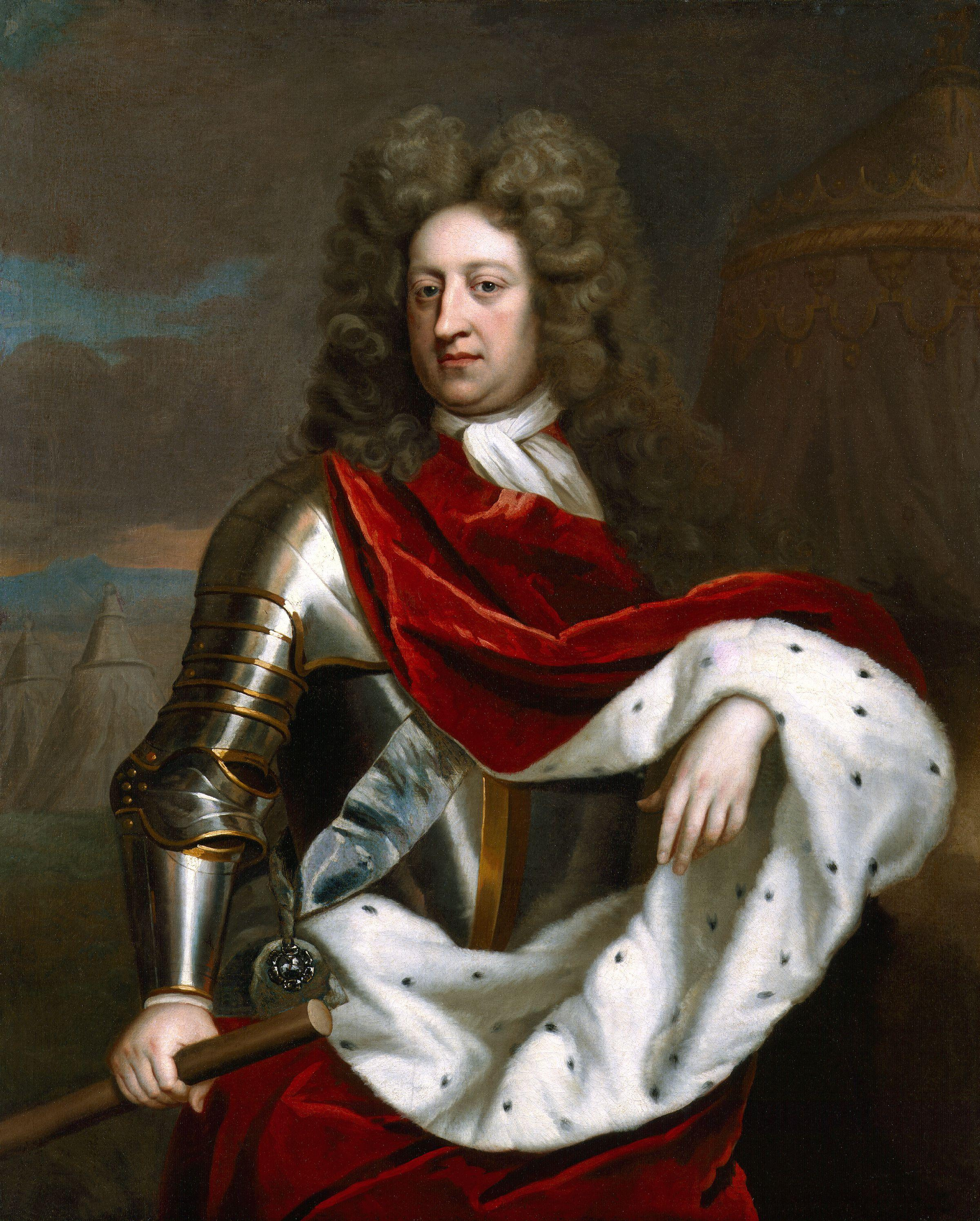
Prince George of Denmark became the first royal consort of Great Britain in 1707.

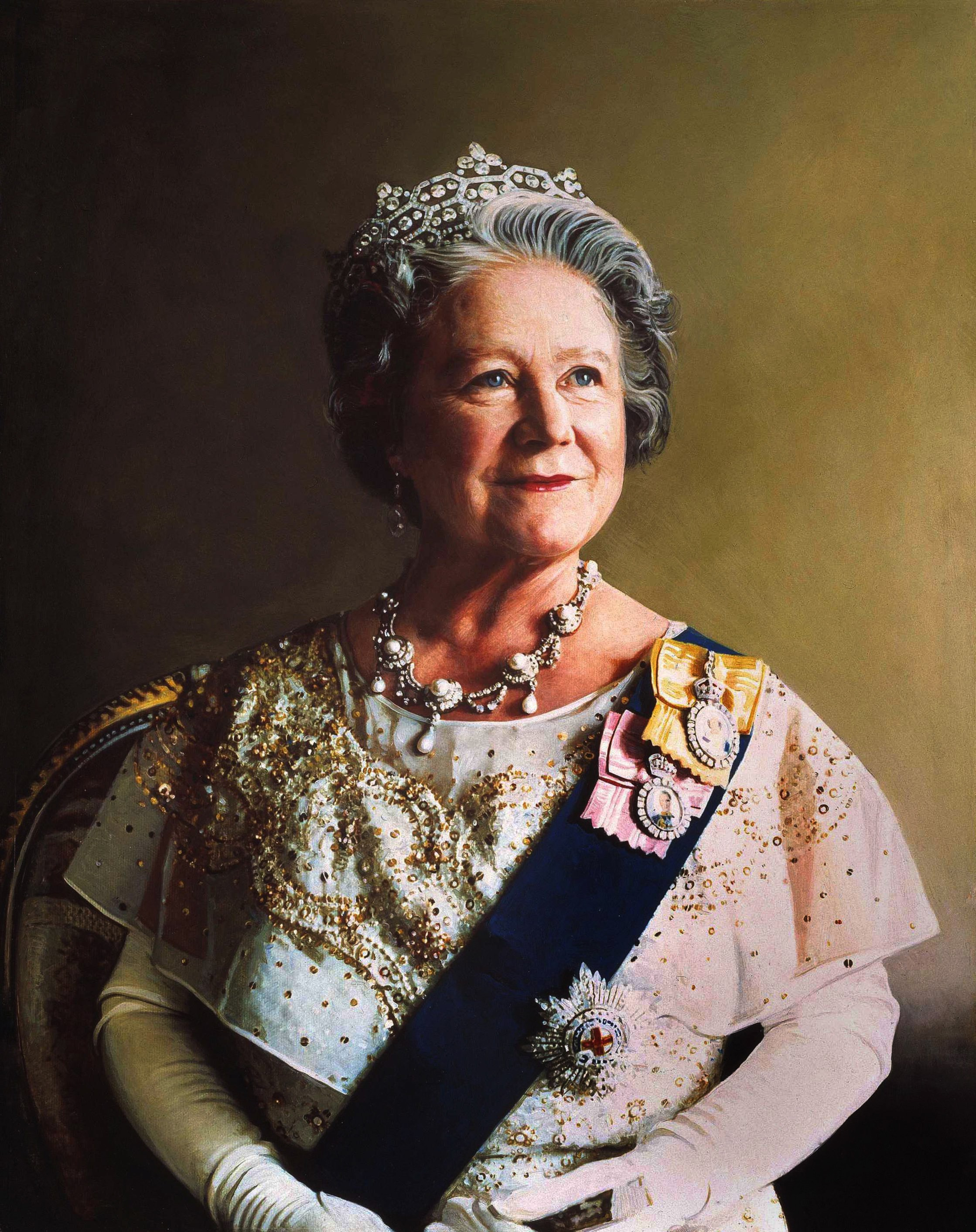
Lady Elizabeth Bowes-Lyon was the longest-lived British royal consort.

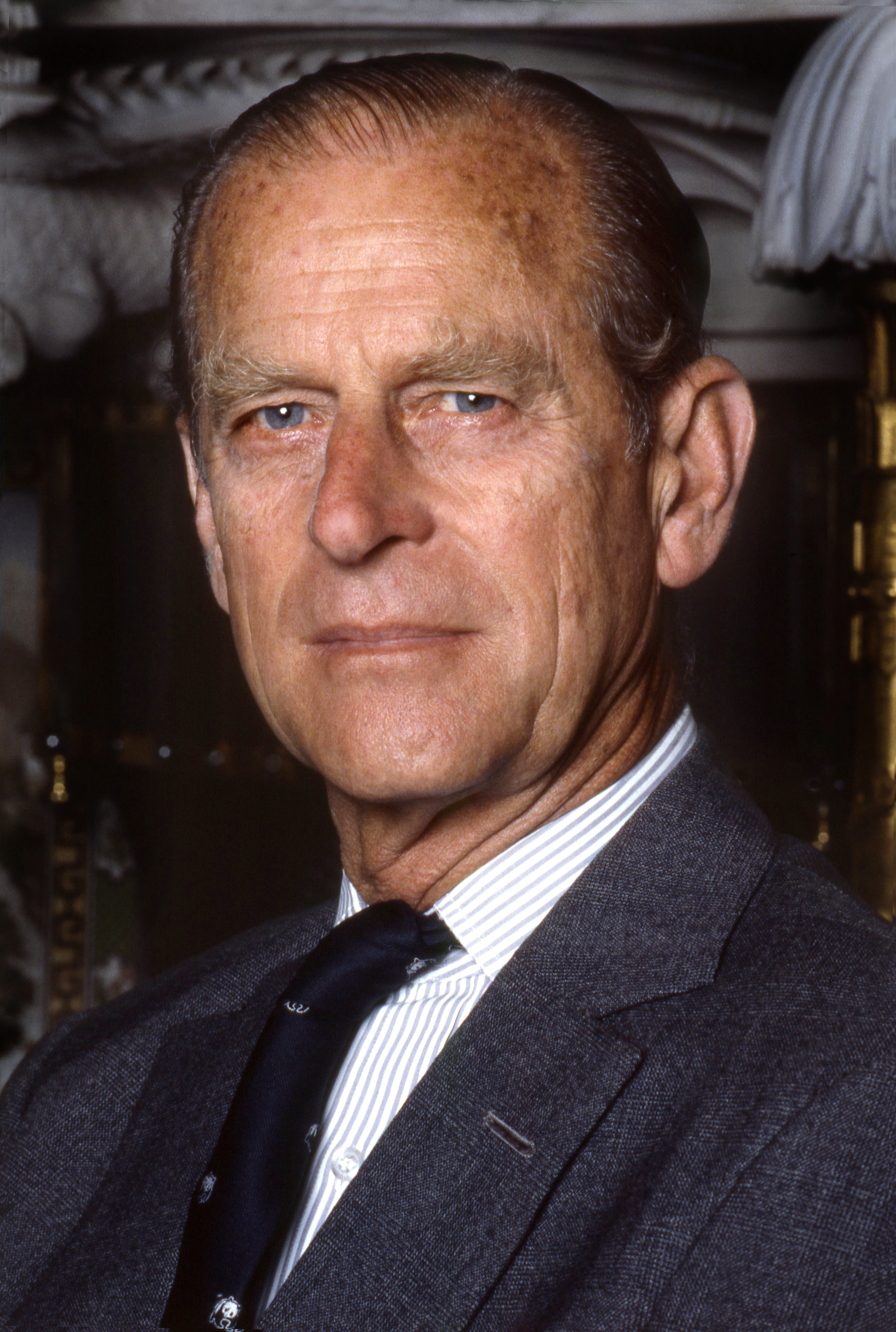
Prince Philip of Greece and Denmark was the longest-serving British royal consort.

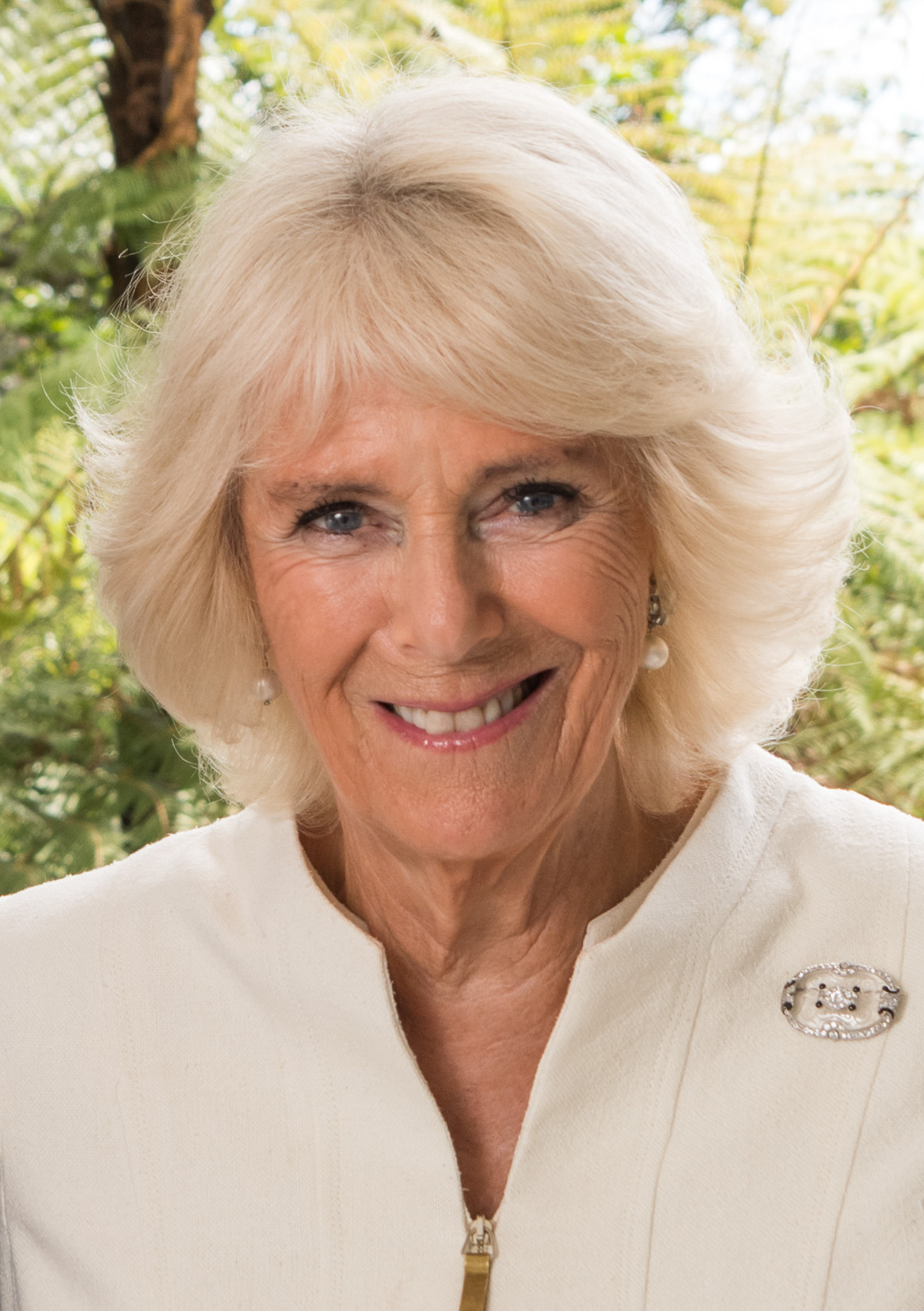
Camilla Shand is the current queen consort of the United Kingdom.

A royal consort is the spouse of a reigning monarch. Consorts of British monarchs have no constitutional status or power but many have had significant influence, and support the sovereign in their duties. There have been 11 royal consorts since the Acts of Union in 1707, eight women and three men.

Prince Philip, the husband of Queen Elizabeth II, was the longest-serving consort, whilst his mother-in-law Queen Elizabeth the Queen Mother was the longest-lived consort. Since the accession of King Charles III on 8 September 2022, his wife Queen Camilla has held the position of queen consort.

== History ==
Since the union of England and Scotland in 1707, there have been eleven consorts of the British monarch. Queens between 1727 and 1814 were also Electresses of Hanover, as their husbands all held the title of Elector of Hanover. Between 1814 and 1837, queens held the title as Queen of Hanover, as their husbands were kings of Hanover. The personal union with the United Kingdom ended in 1837 on the accession of Queen Victoria because the succession laws (Salic Law) in Hanover prevented a female inheriting the title if there was any surviving male heir (in the United Kingdom, a male took precedence over only his own sisters, until the Succession to the Crown Act 2013 which removed male primogeniture). In the Austro-Prussian War of 1866, Hanover was annexed by Prussia and became the Province of Hanover.

Since 1937, the sovereign's consort and the first four individuals in the line of succession who are over 21 may be appointed counsellors of state. Counsellors of state perform some of the sovereign's duties in the United Kingdom while the sovereign is out of the country or temporarily incapacitated.

== Style ==
The wife of the reigning king as his consort is styled as "Her Majesty The Queen" during her husband's reign and "Her Majesty Queen [first name]" upon her husband's death. The Queen is referred to as "Her Majesty" and addressed as "Your Majesty". Since her coronation in 2023, the current royal consort, Queen Camilla, has also been styled as "Her Majesty The Queen" per tradition. Camilla was styled as "Her Majesty The Queen Consort" preceding the coronation to distinguish her from her then recently deceased mother-in-law, Queen Elizabeth II, who as a queen regnant was also styled as "Her Majesty The Queen".

== Coronation ==
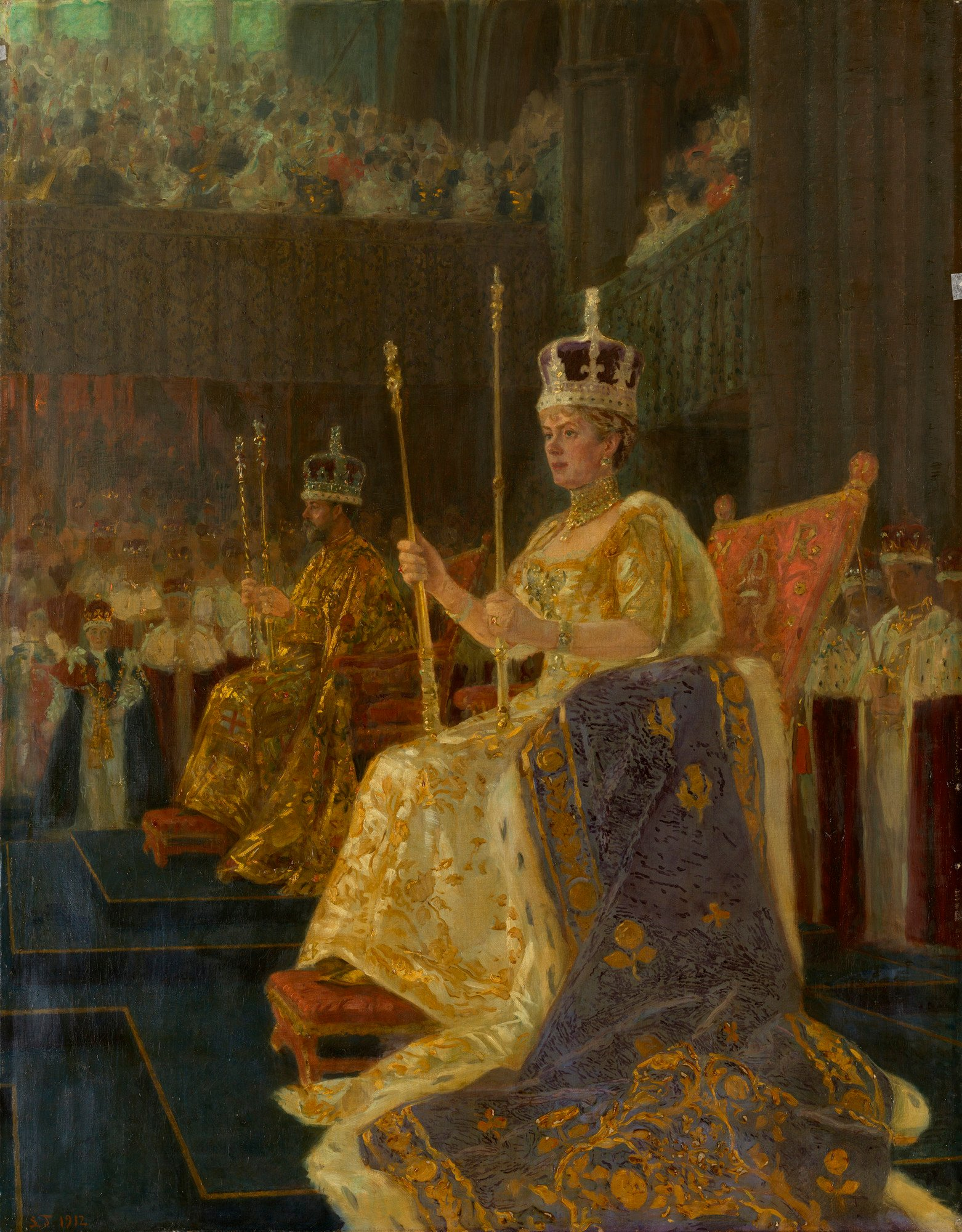
The Coronation of King George V: King George V and Queen Mary Enthroned by Laurits Tuxen, 1912

Queens consort participate in the coronation ceremony, undertaking many of the same ceremonies as the monarch. Queens traditionally wear elaborate robes and walk in the procession under a canopy. They have also been anointed with holy oil and been crowned. Traditionally, male consorts are not crowned or anointed during the coronation ceremony.

An unusual case was Caroline of Brunswick-Wolfenbüttel, who had separated from her husband, George IV, before his accession, became queen consort by law but had no position at court and was forcibly barred from attending his coronation and being crowned.

=== Regalia ===
The earliest surviving consort's crown is that created in 1685 for Mary of Modena. In the early 20th century, new crowns were created for each queen consort in turn. However, Queen Camilla did not have a new crown created for her coronation in 2023 and she was crowned using the 1911 Crown of Queen Mary.

The Queen Consort's Ring was first created for the coronation of Queen Adelaide in 1831, and has been used by queens consort ever since.

The Queen Consort's Rod with Dove represents 'equity and mercy' and the dove, with its folded wings, is symbolic of the Holy Ghost. The Queen Consort's Sceptre with Cross, originally made for the coronation of Mary of Modena in 1685, is inlaid with rock crystals.

== List ==
Picture	Name	Arms	Father (House by birth)	Birth	Marriage	Became consort	Coronation	Ceased to be consort	Death	Spouse
	George of Denmark		Frederick III, King of Denmark (Oldenburg)	2 April 1653	28 July 1683	1 May 1707 Creation of the Kingdom of Great Britain	Not crowned	28 October 1708 55 years, 209 days		Anne
	Caroline of Ansbach		John Frederick, Margrave of Brandenburg-Ansbach (Hohenzollern)	1 March 1683	22 August 1705	11 June 1727 Spouse's accession	11 October 1727	20 November 1737 54 years, 172 days		George II
	Charlotte of Mecklenburg-Strelitz		Duke Charles Louis Frederick of Mecklenburg-Strelitz (Mecklenburg-Strelitz)	19 May 1744	8 September 1761 Marriage to the monarch		22 September 1761	17 November 1818 74 years, 126 days		George III
	Caroline of Brunswick		Charles William Ferdinand, Duke of Brunswick (Brunswick-Bevern)	17 May 1768	8 April 1795	29 January 1820 Spouse's accession	Not crowned	7 August 1821 53 years, 72 days		George IV
	Adelaide of Saxe-Meiningen		George I, Duke of Saxe-Meiningen (Saxe-Meiningen)	13 August 1792	13 July 1818	26 June 1830 Spouse's accession	8 September 1831	20 June 1837 Spouse's death	2 December 1849 56 years, 311 days	William IV
	Albert of Saxe-Coburg and Gotha		Ernest I, Duke of Saxe-Coburg and Gotha (Saxe-Coburg and Gotha)	26 August 1819	10 February 1840 Marriage to the monarch		Not crowned	14 December 1861 42 years, 110 days		Victoria
	Alexandra of Denmark		Christian IX, King of Denmark (Glücksburg)	1 December 1844	10 March 1863	22 January 1901 Spouse's accession	9 August 1902	6 May 1910 Spouse's death	20 November 1925 80 years, 354 days	Edward VII
	Mary of Teck		Francis, Duke of Teck (Teck)	26 May 1867	6 July 1893	6 May 1910 Spouse's accession	22 June 1911	20 January 1936 Spouse's death	24 March 1953 85 years, 302 days	George V
	Elizabeth Bowes-Lyon		Claude Bowes-Lyon, 14th Earl of Strathmore and Kinghorne	4 August 1900	26 April 1923	11 December 1936 Spouse's accession	12 May 1937	6 February 1952 Spouse's death	30 March 2002 101 years, 238 days	George VI
	Philip of Greece and Denmark		Prince Andrew of Greece and Denmark (Glücksburg)	10 June 1921	20 November 1947	6 February 1952 Spouse's accession	Not crowned	9 April 2021 99 years, 303 days		Elizabeth II
	Camilla Shand		Bruce Shand	17 July 1947	9 April 2005	8 September 2022 Spouse's accession	6 May 2023	Incumbent Age: 79 years, 34 days		Charles III

== See also ==
- Family tree of the British royal family
- List of British monarchs
- List of current British princes and princesses
- List of English royal consorts
- English and British royal mistresses
- List of Scottish royal consorts
- List of Scottish royal mistresses
