= Crown of Queen Alexandra =

British crown made in 1902

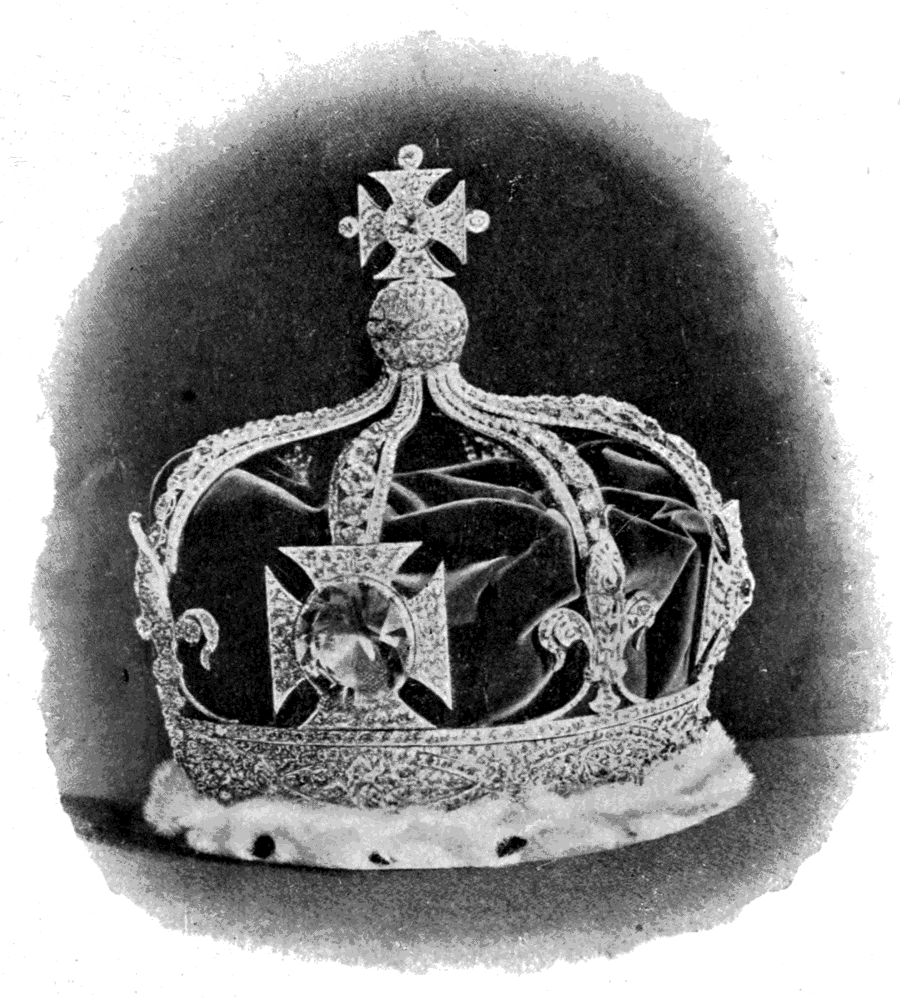
- Engraving of the crown. The European-style crown contained more half arches than was usual in British crowns, and had its cap placed lower, allowing a clear view through the crown.

Details
- Country: United Kingdom
- Made: 1902
- Owner: Charles III in right of the Crown
- Arches: 8 half-arches
- Material: Platinum

The Crown of Queen Alexandra was the consort crown of the British queen Alexandra of Denmark. It was manufactured for the 1902 coronation of King Edward VII and Queen Alexandra. It is now in the royal collection.

== Background ==
Queen Victoria's death in January 1901 ended 64 years of the United Kingdom lacking a crowned queen consort, and Prince Albert of Saxe-Coburg and Gotha had not been crowned as a consort. Traditionally, queens consort had been crowned with the 17th century Crown of Mary of Modena. However, in 1831, Adelaide of Saxe-Meiningen was crowned with a 4 half-arched new small crown, the Crown of Queen Adelaide, because the Modena crown was judged unsuitable for use.

In 1902 it was decided to use neither the Modena nor Adelaide crowns for the first coronation of a queen consort in seven decades. Instead it was decided to create a brand new consort crown, to be named after Queen Alexandra.

== Style ==
The crown departed from the standard style of British crowns, and was more akin to European royal crowns. It was made of platinum for lightness, less upright than the norm in British crowns, and more squat in design, with an unprecedented eight half-arches. Its front arch joined a jewelled cross into which was set the Koh-i-Noor diamond. As with the later Crown of Queen Mary and Crown of Queen Elizabeth, the arches were detachable, allowing the crown to be worn as a circlet.

The Crown of Queen Alexandra was not worn by later queens; new crowns were created for Mary of Teck in 1911 and Elizabeth Bowes-Lyon in 1937. The crown is now on display in the Tower of London. For display, the major precious stones have been replaced with artificial paste stones.

== Gallery ==
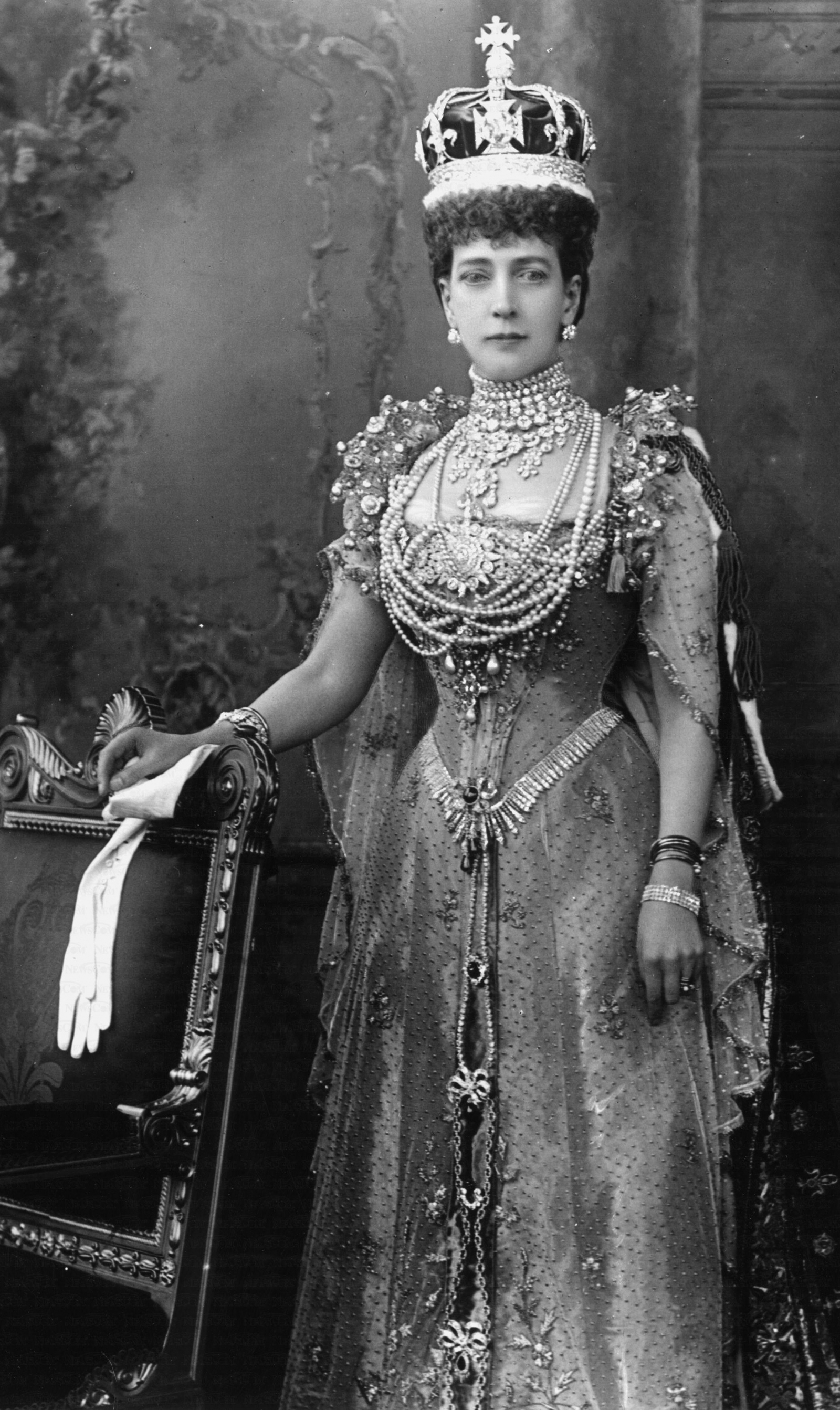
Queen Alexandra wearing the crown in a formal coronation photograph, 1902
