= Crown of Queen Mary =

The Crown of Queen Mary may refer to:

- State Crown of Mary of Modena, made in 1685 for the queen consort of England, Scotland and Ireland
- Crown of Mary of Teck, made in 1911 for the queen consort of the United Kingdom and the British dominions; later renamed the Crown of Queen Camilla and reused by the queen consort of the United Kingdom and other Commonwealth realms

== See also ==
- Queen Mary (disambiguation)
