= Half-arch (crown) =

A half-arch is the piece of metal, usually gold, silver or platinum, and typically decorated with jewels, that links the circlet (circular base) of a hoop crown to the monde at the top of the crown.

== Number of Arches ==
=== European tradition of eight half-arches ===
Many crowns of continental European monarchs traditionally contain eight half-arches; examples from extant monarchies include the royal crowns of Denmark, the Netherlands, Norway, Spain and Sweden. The only example of a crown of a British monarch with eight half-arches is the Imperial Crown of India, made for King George V as Emperor of India to wear at the Delhi Durbar of 1911. The crowns of two 20th-century British queens consort also have eight half-arches, namely the Crown of Queen Alexandra (1902) and the Crown of Queen Mary (1911), reflecting their origins as European princesses from Denmark and Germany respectively.

=== British tradition of four half-arches ===
In contrast, the crowns of British monarchs traditionally contain four half-arches; examples include St. Edward's Crown, the State Crown of George I, the Coronation Crown of George IV and the Imperial State Crown, and also the Crown of Scotland. The same is true for several British consort crowns, namely the State Crown of Mary of Modena, the Crown of Queen Adelaide and the Crown of Queen Elizabeth The Queen Mother.

=== Crown of the Prince of Wales's single arch ===
The three crowns in existence of the Prince of Wales, the heir apparent to the British throne, all have one full arch, with a globe centred on the single arch rather than being the element to which each arch separately is joined, following an instruction laid down by King Charles II in 1677. Unlike the princely crowns of 1902 and 1969 however, where the single arch rises, in the Crown of Frederick, Prince of Wales (1728) the single arch dips in the centre, with the globe located in the centre of the dip.

== Shape of arch ==
Different crowns possess different-shaped half-arches. In some crowns, the half-arches dip down at the centre of the crown where they meet the globe. The most widely recognized example of this is St. Edward's Crown, the British coronation crown, while in others, such as Queen Elizabeth's consort crown, all four half-arches rise at a somewhat right angle, with no central dip.

However, in the case of the State Crown of George I, while the crown as originally designed had dipping arches, they were pulled up to a right angle for the coronation of King George II and have remained in that position.

== Detachable arches ==
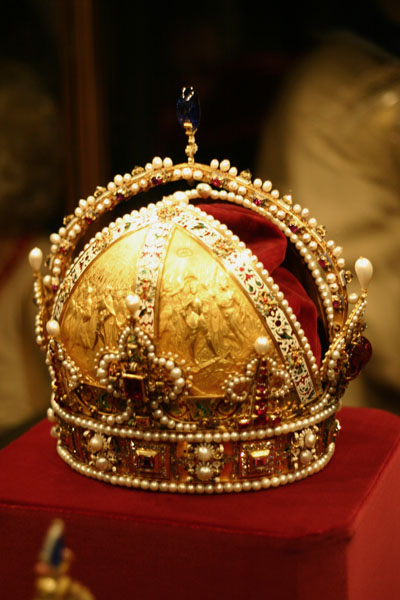
Imperial Crown of Austria (Crown of Rudolf II)

In some crowns, such as the British Imperial State Crown, the half-arches are detachable, allowing the crown to be worn as a circlet. Alexandra of Denmark, Mary of Teck and Elizabeth Bowes-Lyon (British queens consort Alexandra, Mary and Elizabeth) all at various stages wore their own crowns as circlets, particularly after the deaths of their husbands, when one of their children was on the throne and they were the queen mother.

== Velvet inlay ==
Where a crown possesses arches or half-arches, the circlet of the crown below the arches or half-arches are usually filled with velvet or other cloth, or with a jewelled metal cap. Different states and different crowns may possess different coloured cloth inlays.

The most widely used colours for cloth infills are purple, as in the Crown of Queen Elizabeth and in St. Edward's Crown, and dark red, as in the Imperial Crown of Austria.

== No arches ==
Not all crowns possess arches. The Danish Crown of Christian IV that was used for the coronation of elected monarchs prior to the introduction of absolutism in 1660 has no covering at all but exists in circlet form, while the Papal Tiara rises as one solid silver (or in one occasion gold) unit. Nor are arches to be found on the Iron Crown of Lombardy (though the iron piece for which it is named, now lost, may have been an arch), nor any of the Iranian Crown Jewels. Both the Imperial Crown of Russia and the Imperial Crown of Austria possess two central half-arches, with most of the rest of the crown covered in.

== See also ==
- Monarchy
- Enthronement

== Sources ==
- Anna Keay, The Crown Jewels: Official Guidebook (Historic Royal Palaces, 2002) ISBN 1-873993-20-X
