= Consort crown =

Crown worn by the spouse of a monarch

A consort crown is a crown worn by the consort of a monarch for their coronation or on state occasions. Unlike with reigning monarchs, who may inherit one or more crowns for use, consorts sometimes had crowns made uniquely for them and which were worn by no other subsequent consorts.

All British queens consort crowned from 1831 to 1937, which included Adelaide of Saxe-Meiningen, Alexandra of Denmark, Mary of Teck and Elizabeth Bowes-Lyon, wore their own specially made consort crowns. Each queen went on to outlive her husband but, as a queen dowager, they retained the title, crown and other privileges of a queen for life. Previous English and British queens consort had used the State Crown of Mary of Modena, wife of King James II, until Adelaide of Saxe-Meiningen, the consort of King William IV, wore a new consort crown created for her. For the coronation of Charles III and Camilla in 2023, Camilla wore the Crown of Queen Mary.

In Imperial Russia, there were no unique consort crowns, because the Lesser Imperial Crown was intended to be used for coronation of all empresses consort, and after that, they did not wear crowns.

== Famous consort crowns ==
- Denmark
  - Crown of the Queen Consort
- France
  - Crown of Empress Eugénie
- Hungary
  - Crown of the Queen
- Iran
  - Empress's Crown
- Norway
  - Crown of the Queen
- Poland
  - Queen's Crown
  - Crown of Queen Maria Josepha
- Portugal
  - Diadem of the Stars
- Romania
  - Crown of Queen Elisabeta
  - Crown of Queen Maria
- Russia
  - Lesser Imperial Crown (the crown used by the Tsaritsas by marriage when being crowned)
  - Crown of Tsaritsa Maria Feodorovna
- Spain
  - Crown of the Queen Consort (Used by Queen Mercedes, Queen Maria Christina and Queen Victoria Eugenie)
- Sweden
  - Crown of the Queen Consort
- United Kingdom
  - Crown of Mary of Modena
  - Crown of Queen Adelaide
  - Crown of Queen Alexandra
  - Crown of Queen Elizabeth (Note: Crown of Queen Elizabeth The Queen Mother)
  - Crown of Queen Camilla (Note: Formerly the Crown of Queen Mary)
