= Coronation of William IV and Adelaide =

1831 coronation in the United Kingdom

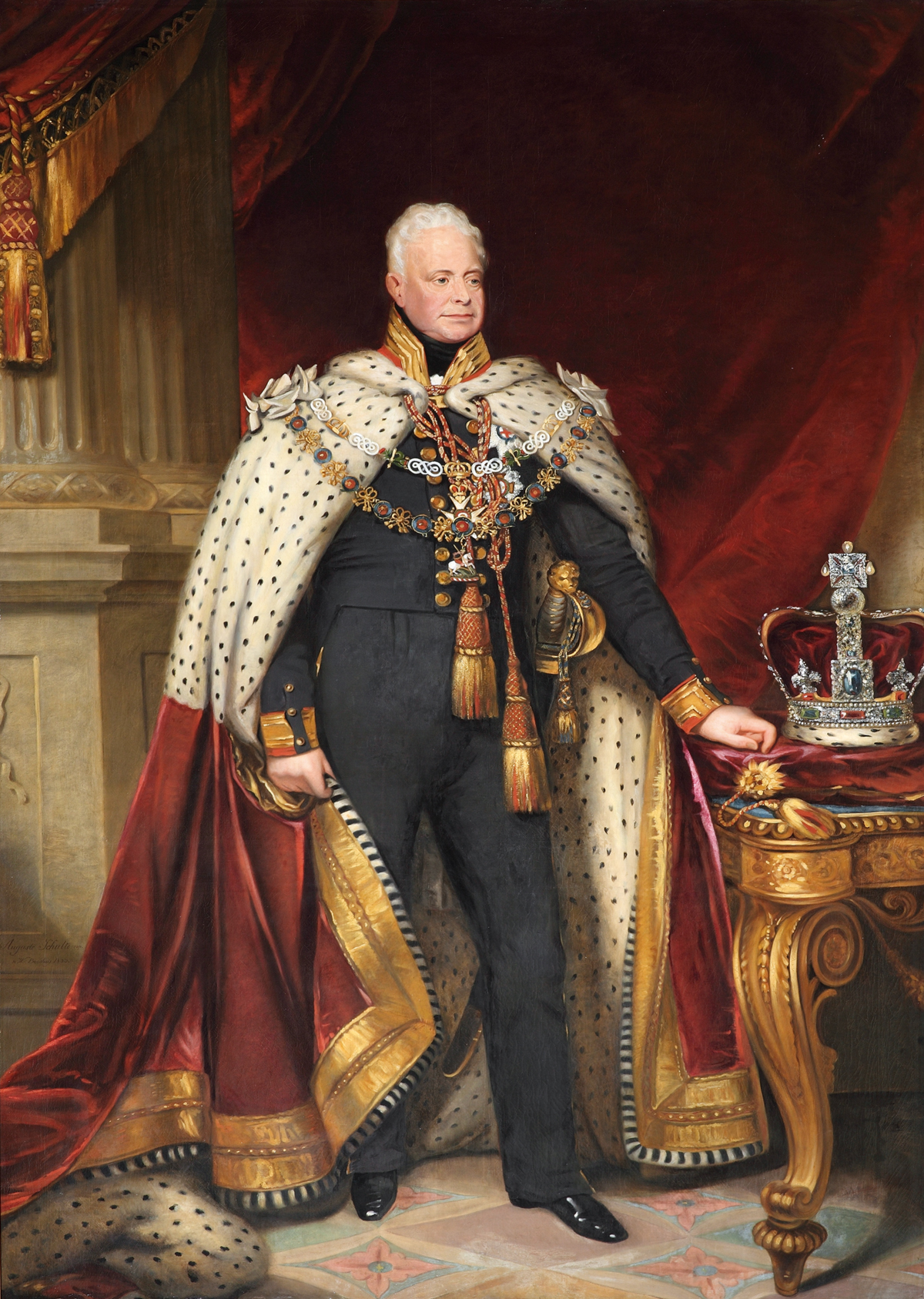
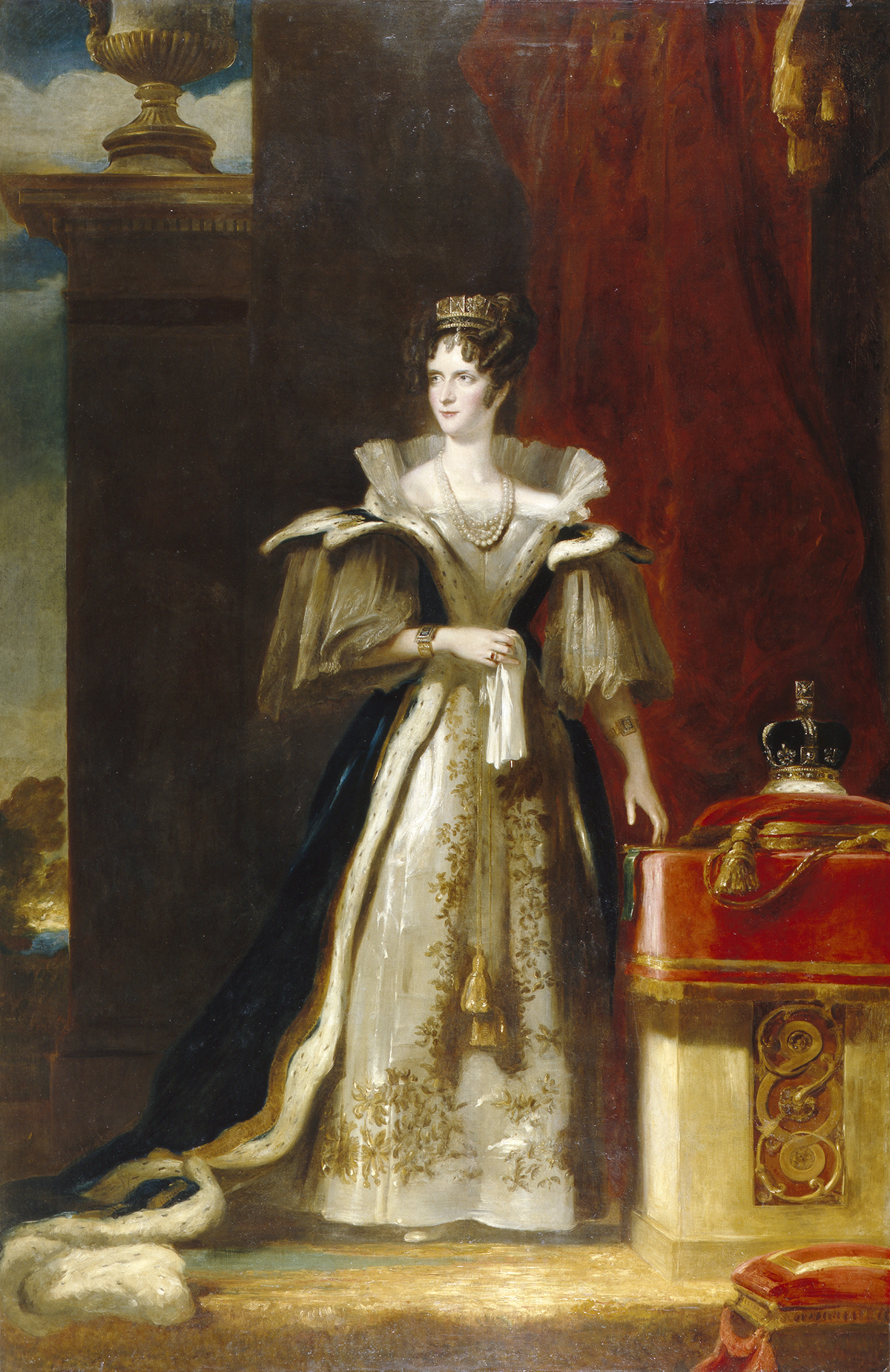
- William IV depicted with St Edward's Crown, by Sir William Beechey; and Adelaide depicted with her crown, by John Simpson
- Date: 8 September 1831; 195 years ago
- Location: Westminster Abbey, London, England
- Budget: £30,000
- Participants: King William IV; Queen Adelaide; Great Officers of State; Archbishops and Bishops Assistant of the Church of England; Garter Principal King of Arms; Peers of the Realm

The coronation of William IV and his wife, Adelaide, as king and queen of the United Kingdom took place on Thursday, 8 September 1831, over fourteen months after he succeeded to the throne of the United Kingdom at the age of 64, the oldest person to assume the throne until Charles III in 2022. The ceremony was held in Westminster Abbey after a public procession through the streets from St James's Palace, to which the King and Queen returned later as part of a second procession.

== Background ==
William IV succeeded his brother George IV on 26 June 1830. His first prime minister was Arthur Wellesley, 1st Duke of Wellington, who had led a chaotic Tory administration since January 1828. Until 1867, the Demise of the Crown automatically triggered the dissolution of parliament and a general election was therefore necessary with voting between 29 July and 1 September 1830. Although King George IV's death was the official reason for the election, its importance in British constitutional history was that electoral reform was the major issue of the day, especially with the ongoing Swing Riots. Wellington's Tories won a plurality but continuing divisions on the reform issue resulted in the loss of a vote of confidence on 15 November 1830. Wellington had to resign and, on 22 November, Earl Grey formed the Whig administration which eventually passed the Representation of the People Act 1832 (the "Great Reform Act") on 7 June 1832. William's coronation was overshadowed by the political turbulence of the time, while the Reform Bill was undergoing debate.

== The "Half Crown-nation" ==
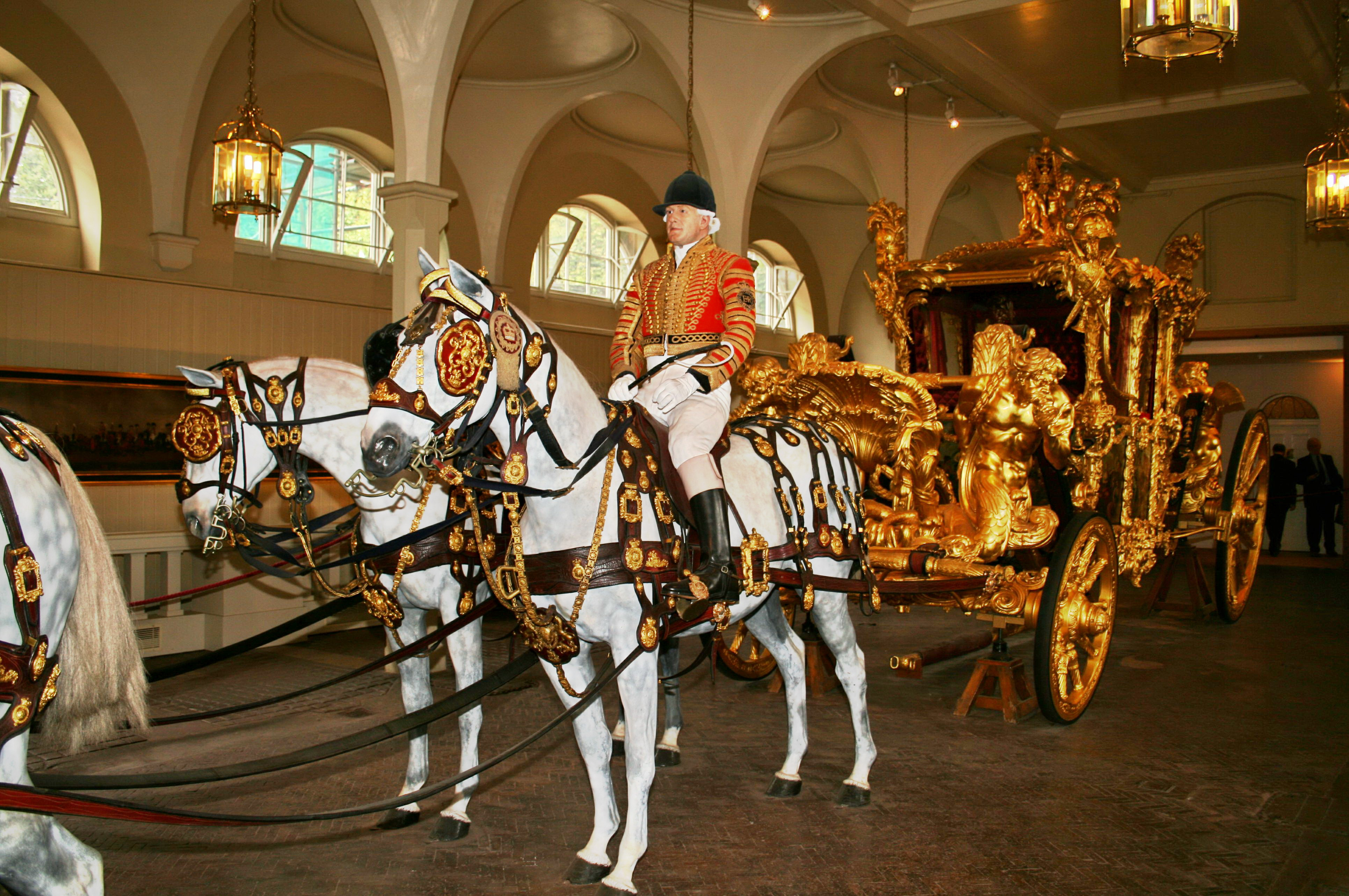
The Gold State Coach, drawn by eight horses, in the Royal Mews

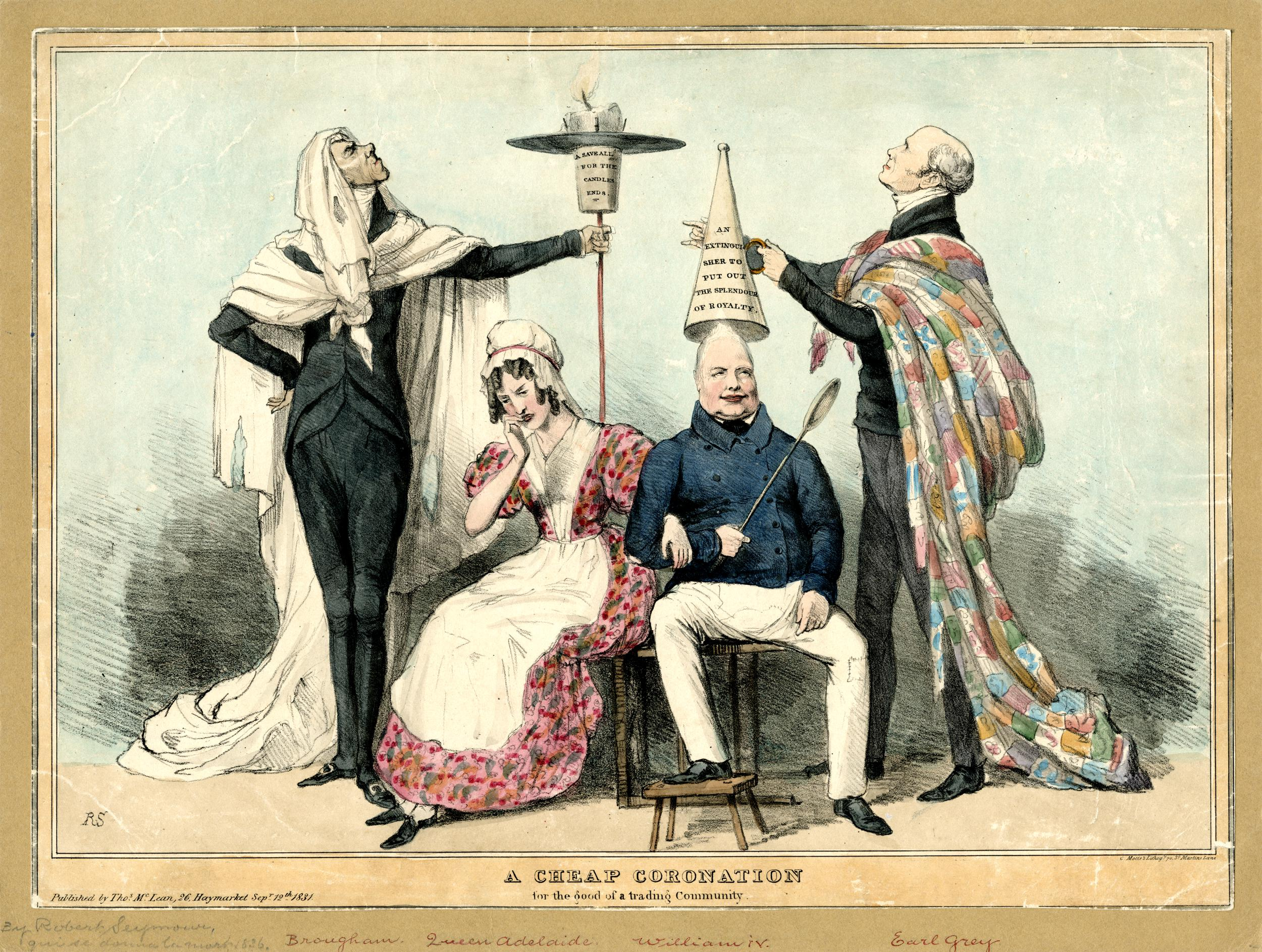
Cartoon by Robert Seymour mocking the cut-price coronation.

William's coronation, following that of George IV on 19 July 1821, was the second of three in the nineteenth century. The next coronation was that of his niece and successor, Victoria, on Thursday, 28 June 1838.

According to the historian Roy Strong, William IV had "an inbred dislike of ceremonial" and he wanted to dispense with the coronation altogether. He conceded that there was a constitutional necessity but insisted that there must be no ceremonial or procession associated with Westminster Hall and this outraged the Tories, who called the event the "Half Crown-nation". As Strong says, William's insistence "signalled the end of a whole litany of symbolic acts going back to the Middle Ages, including the coronation banquet, the ritual of the King's Champion throwing down the gauntlet, and endless petty actions related to land tenure".

King William and Queen Adelaide travelled to and from the Abbey in the Gold State Coach, or Coronation Coach, made for George III in 1762 and used in all coronations from 1831. This began the provision of public spectacle for the masses. The King wore his admiral's uniform and the Queen wore a white and gold dress.

In terms of cost, the King and the government refused to repeat the extreme of his brother's lavish coronation in 1821, which cost £240,000, (equivalent to £22,800,000 in 2025) but they went to the opposite extreme and spent only £30,000 on a "cut-price" event (equivalent to £2,700,000 in 2025). Seven years later, Queen Victoria's coronation was budgeted at £70,000 to achieve a compromise between the two extremes.

== Public procession and crowds ==
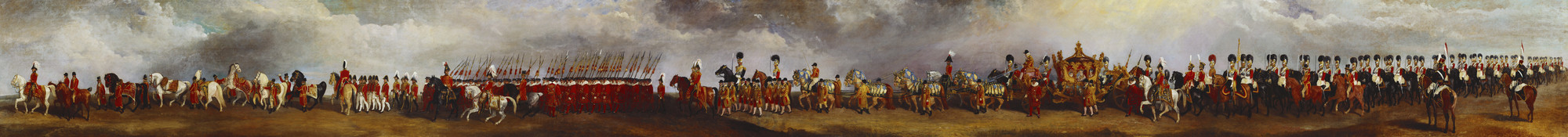
Part of the Coronation Procession of William IV by Richard Barrett Davis

William IV's coronation established much of what remains today the pageantry of the event, which had previously involved peerage-only ceremonies in Westminster Hall (now attached to the Houses of Parliament) before a procession on foot across the road to the Abbey. The new monarch travelled in the Coronation Coach with a cavalry escort. This procession to and from the Abbey started a tradition which has been followed at all subsequent coronations. The budget stressed the procession and there was no coronation banquet. Unlike the coronation of Queen Victoria in 1838, no real consideration was given to the matter of public entertainment and the people had to make do with the two processions between St James's and the Abbey. At 5 am, a gun salute was fired in Hyde Park and at 9 am, the royal family left the palace followed an hour later by the King and Queen in the Gold State Coach, the first time that it had been used at a coronation. The coaches, escorted by Life Guards, passed along Pall Mall to Charing Cross and then along Whitehall to the Abbey. Along the route, which was lined by foot guards, temporary stands for spectators had been built, those at Charing Cross could hold up to three thousand. The return procession left the Abbey at 3:30 pm in fine weather. That evening, the "New Avenue", now known as The Mall, was illuminated and opened to the public for the first time.

== Service ==
Despite the omission of large parts of the ceremonial, the service was largely unchanged since the previous coronation, which had itself been based on the revision made to the traditional texts in 1761. Some amendments were made by the archbishop of Canterbury, William Howley, who presided at the service, including the addition of new prayers intended to reflect the constitutional changes brought about by the Reform Bill. In accordance with William's dislike of ritual, the traditional girding of the sword and donning of armills were omitted. William himself wore a robe over his admiral's uniform, instead of the traditional coronation vestments.

=== Music ===
Although the liturgy was largely unchanged from the previous coronation, the music was simpler, with the Litany and the Nicene Creed being spoken rather than sung, and some established elements being omitted altogether. It is thought that Thomas Attwood and William Knyvett were responsible for the music, although there is no contemporary confirmation, but it is recorded that the conductor was Sir George Thomas Smart, who was the organist at the Chapel Royal.

The opening anthem was Attwood's setting of I was glad, which had been composed for the 1821 coronation. Handel's Zadok the Priest and Hallelujah Chorus were included again, and it seems likely that Knyvett's The King shall rejoice and William Boyce's Te Deum in A were both reused, although records are incomplete. The final anthem by Attwood was an elaborate new setting of O Lord, grant the King a long life, which incorporated part of the melody of Rule, Britannia!, probably a reference to William's naval career.

== Attendees ==
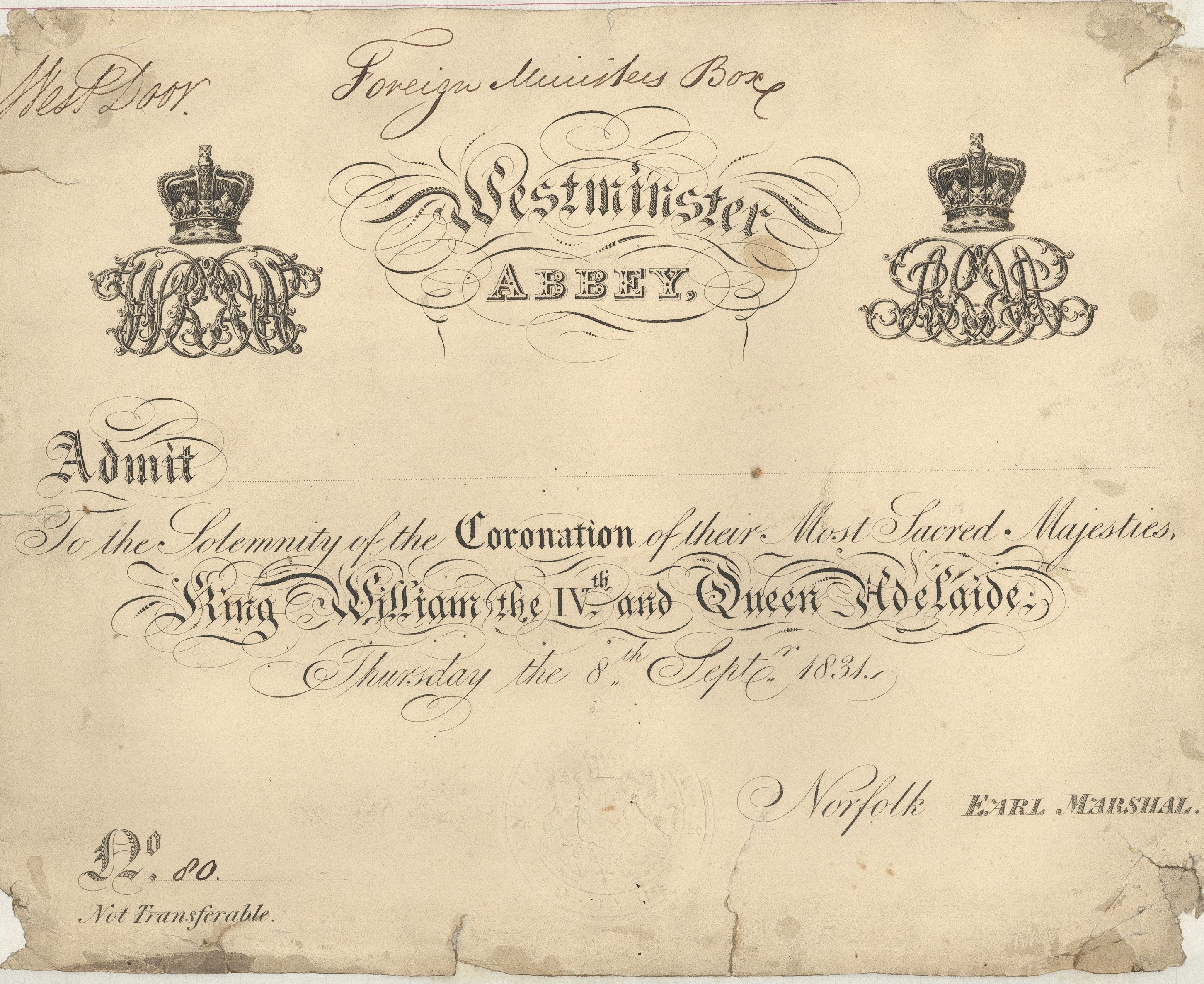
King William IV and Queen Adelaide coronation admission ticket

Those present at the coronation included:

- The Duke and Duchess of Cumberland and Teviotdale, the King's brother and sister-in-law
- The Duke of Sussex, the King's brother
  - Sir Augustus d'Este, the King's nephew
- The Duchess of Cambridge, the King's sister-in-law
- The Duchess and Duke of Gloucester and Edinburgh, the King's sister and brother-in-law (also first cousin)
- The Earl of Munster, the King's illegitimate son
- Lord Frederick FitzClarence, the King's illegitimate son
- Lord Adolphus FitzClarence, the King's illegitimate son
- The Countess and Earl of Erroll, the King's illegitimate daughter and son-in-law

== See also ==
- Coronation portraits of William IV and Adelaide

== Bibliography ==
- Sandars, Mary F. (1915). The life and times of Queen Adelaide. London: Stanley Paul & Co.
- Strong, Sir Roy (2005). Coronation: a History of Kingship and the British Monarchy. London: Harper Collins. ISBN 978-0007160549.
- Range, Matthias (2012). Music and Ceremonial at British Coronations: From James I to Elizabeth II. London: Cambridge University Press. ISBN 978-1-107-02344-4.
- Worsley, Lucy (2018). Queen Victoria – Daughter, Wife, Mother, Widow. London: Hodder & Stoughton Ltd. ISBN 978-1-4736-5138-8.
