= Crown of Queen Maria Josepha =

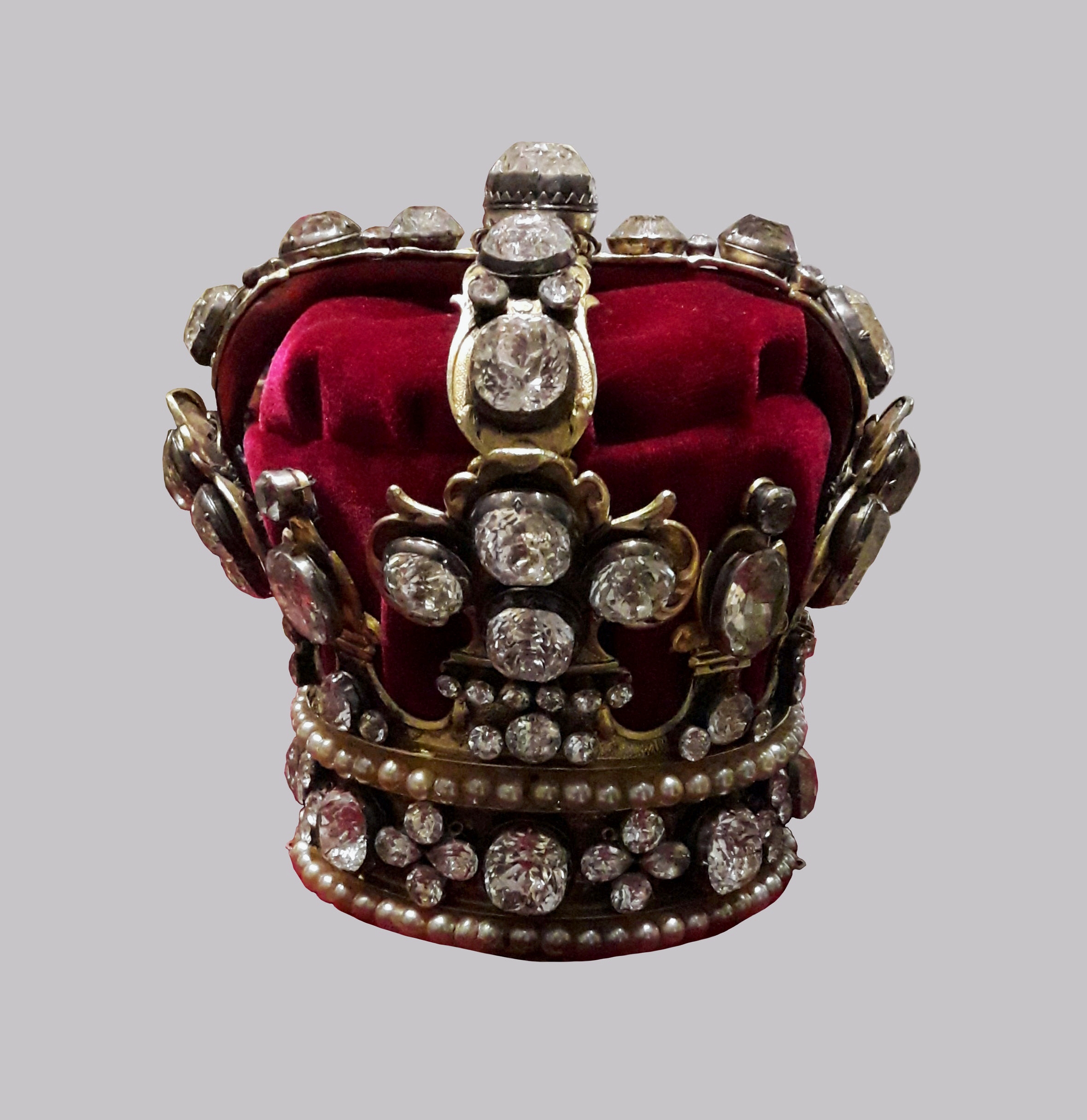
Crown of Queen Maria Josepha

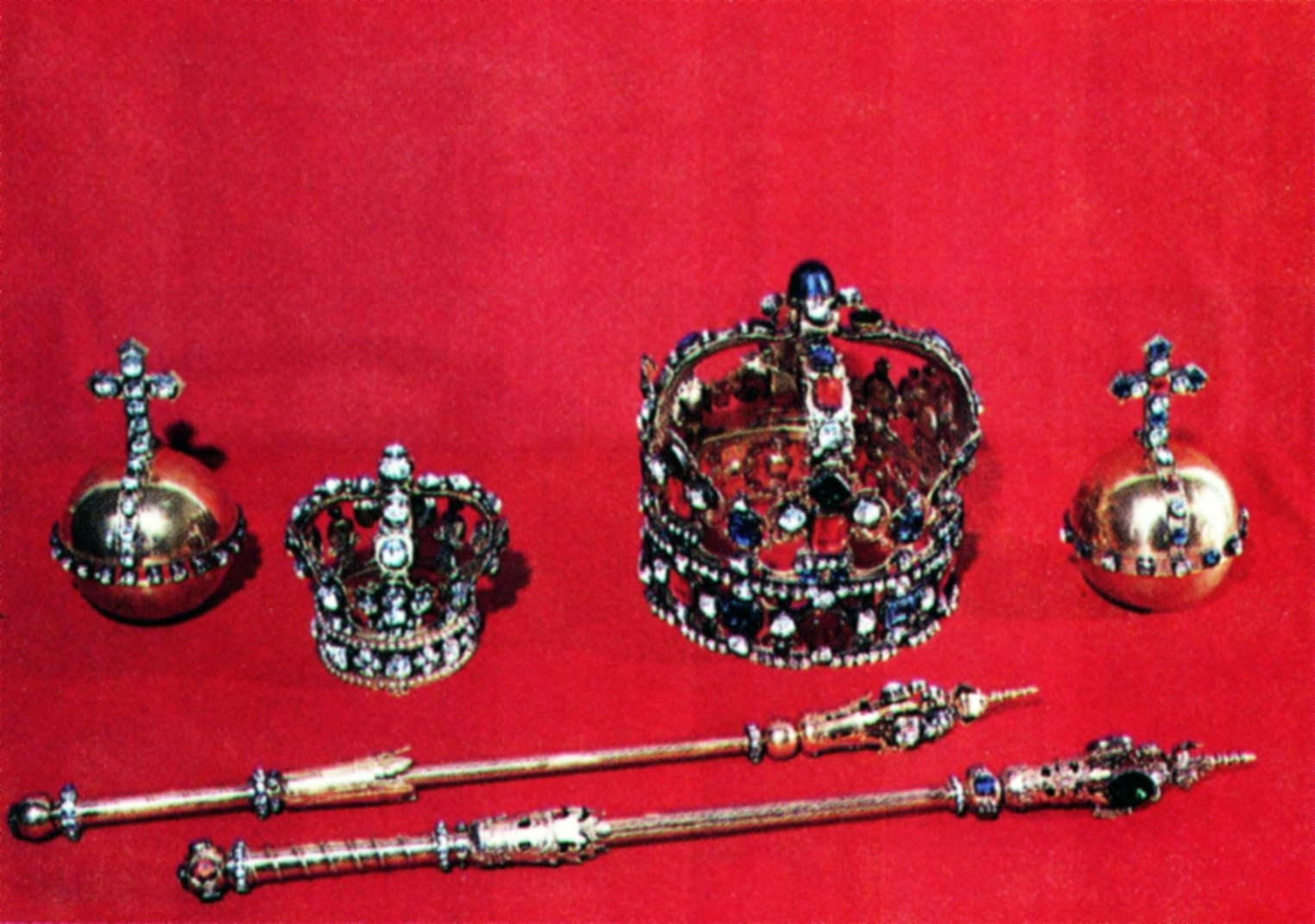
Silver regalia of King Augustus III of Poland and Queen Maria Josepha

Crown of Maria Josepha was made for Maria Josepha of Austria for her coronation as queen consort of Poland in 1734.

== History ==
In 1925 the Polish Government bought the silver regalia of King Augustus III and Queen Maria Josepha in Vienna for $35,000 (175 000 zł). It consisted of 2 crowns, 2 sceptres and 2 orbs made in about 1733. The original Crown Regalia were hidden - see War of the Polish Succession. The jewels were exhibited in Warsaw till 1939. In 1940 German forces stole them. Later they were found by Soviet troops in Germany and sent to the USSR, where they stayed until 1960, when they were returned to Poland. Today are deposited in the National Museum in Warsaw.
