= Coronation Crown of George IV =

Crown, manufactured 1821

Coronation Crown of King George IV
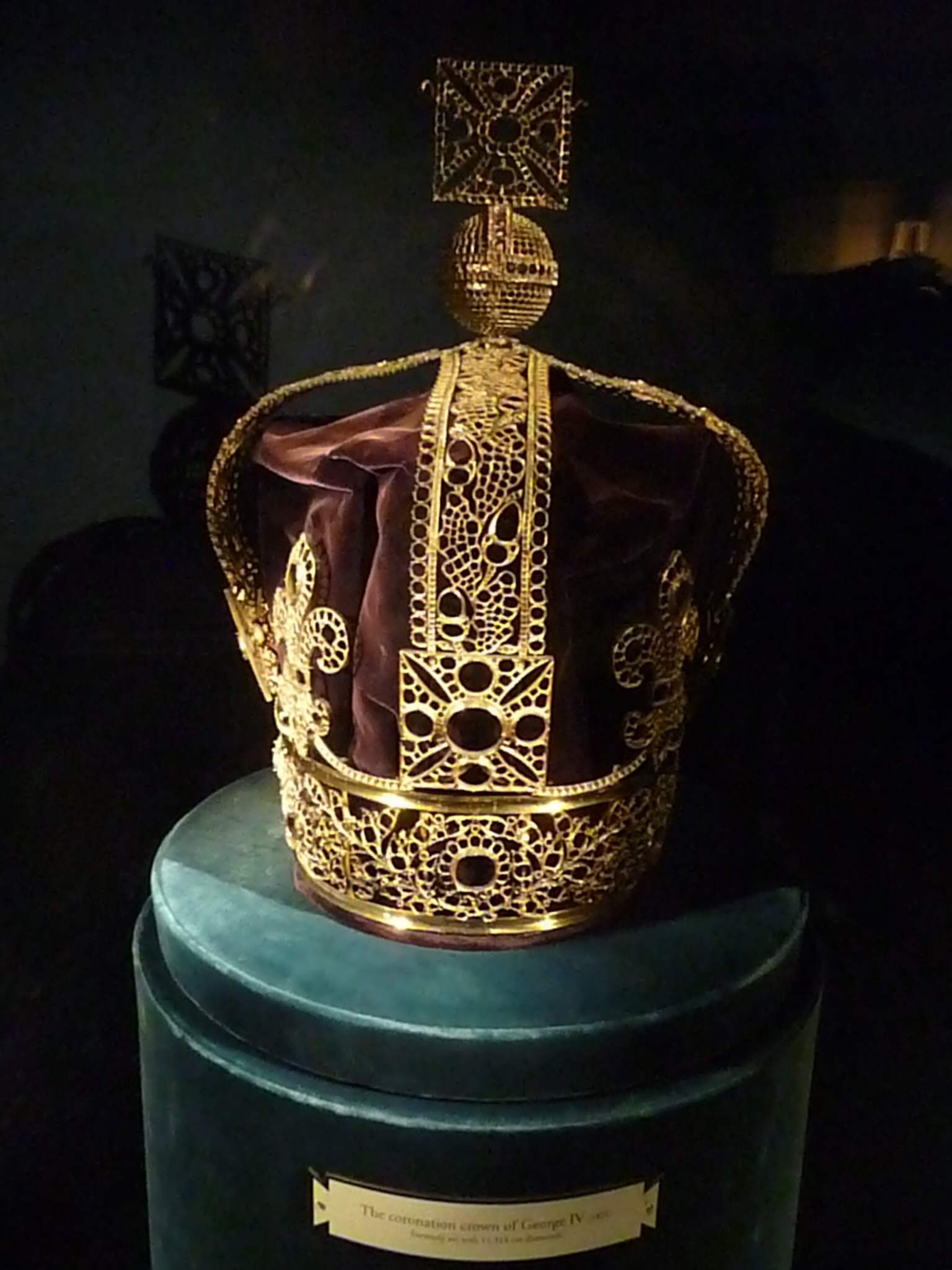

Details
- Country: United Kingdom
- Made: 1821
- Arches: 4
- Material: Gold, silver
- Cap: Blue velvet trimmed with ermine

The Coronation Crown of George IV is an elaborate coronation crown made specially for George IV, King of the United Kingdom, in 1821.

== Design ==
At 40 cm (16 in) tall and decorated with 12,314 diamonds, it was said to make him look like a "gorgeous bird of the east". The innovative gold and silver frame, created by Philip Liebart of Rundell, Bridge & Rundell, had been designed to be almost invisible underneath the diamonds. A plan to remove the traditional fleurs-de-lis and introduce the rose, thistle and shamrock, the floral emblems of England, Scotland and Ireland, was abandoned following objections by the College of Heralds. As a general rule, the maintenance caps in British crowns are made of crimson or purple velvet, but this crown differed in having a dark blue cap.

== Fate ==
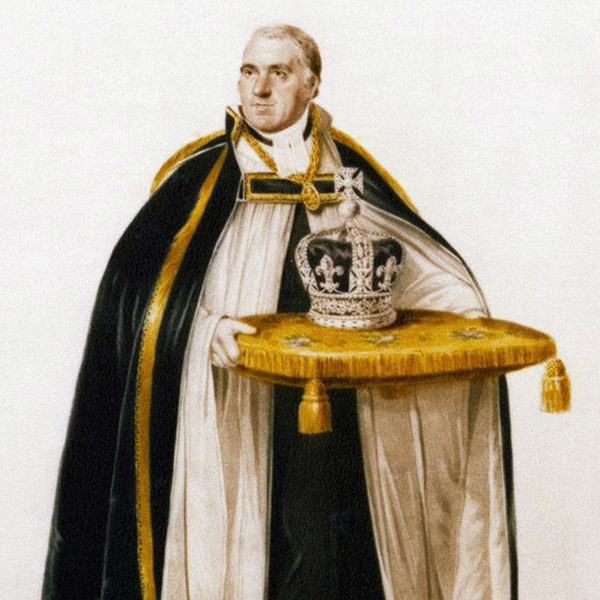
The Dean of Westminster carrying the crown at George IV's coronation, 1821

Because of the postponement of George IV's coronation owing to the trial of his wife, Queen Caroline, the final bill for the hiring of the stones came to £24,425. After his coronation, the king was reluctant to part with his new crown, and lobbied the government to buy it outright so he could use it for the annual State Opening of Parliament, but it was too expensive and the crown was dismantled in 1823. George purchased a bronze life-sized model of his crown for £38, on which the inscription reads: "Cast of the Rich Imperial Diamond Crown with which His Most Sacred Majesty King George IV was crowned on 19 July 1821".

Emptied of its jewels and discarded by the royal family, the crown was loaned to the Museum of London by the Amherst family from 1933 until 1985. It was purchased by the jewellers Asprey in 1987. Jefri Bolkiah, Prince of Brunei, brother of the Sultan of Brunei, bought Asprey in November 1995 and presented the crown to the United Kingdom, along with the State Crown of George I, Crown of Queen Adelaide, and the Coronation Bible of George III. Earlier that year it had been valued at £376,000 for the purposes of an application to export the crown to the United States. The application was withdrawn during a review by the Reviewing Committee on the Export of Works of Art. It is now part of the Royal Collection. It was on public display in the Martin Tower at the Tower of London from 1996 until 2023, and is now on display in the tower's Jewel House.

== See also ==
- George IV State Diadem
- St Edward's Crown
- State Crown of George I
- Imperial State Crown of Queen Victoria
