= Crowns of Mary of Modena =

Part of the British Crown Jewels

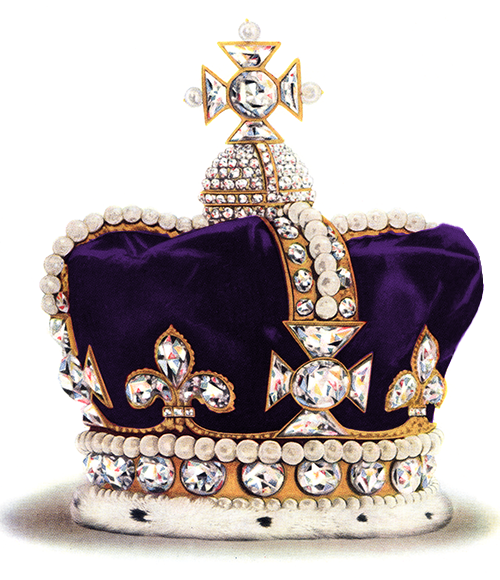
- The State Crown of Mary of Modena

Details
- Country: United Kingdom
- Made: 1685
- Owner: Charles III in right of the Crown
- Weight: 700 g (1.5 lb)
- Arches: 4
- Material: Gold
- Cap: Purple velvet with an ermine band
- Other elements: Silver, pearls, diamonds
- Successors: Nuptial Crown of Queen Charlotte

The Crowns of Mary of Modena are two consort crowns and a diadem made in 1685 for Mary of Modena, queen of England, Scotland and Ireland. They were used by queens consort and queens regnant until the end of the 18th century.

The state crown and the diadem are on display in the Jewel House at the Tower of London, while the coronation crown is owned by the Museum of London.

== Origin ==
Traditionally, when a king is married, his wife is crowned as queen at their coronation ceremony. In 1649, the monarchy was abolished after a long civil war between Charles I and his Parliament, and the Crown Jewels were either sold or turned into coins by the Mint. The coronation of Mary of Modena and her husband, James II and VII, marked the first time a queen was crowned after the restoration of the monarchy, Charles II having been unmarried when he took the throne in 1660.

Three pieces of headgear were made for the queen: a diadem to wear in procession to Westminster Abbey, a coronation crown for the crowning, and a state crown to wear upon leaving the abbey. Made by Richard de Beauvoir, the state crown was covered in diamonds valued at £35,000, and the bill for hiring them was £1,000. She paid for the crowns and diadem out of her own pocket, and also commissioned two new sceptres and a coronation ring for the ceremony.

== Description ==
The gold state crown originally had 523 small diamonds, 38 large diamonds, and 129 large pearls. These have been replaced with quartz crystals. It is 19 centimetres (7.5 in) tall and weighs 700 grams (1.5 lb). The crown is decorated with crosses pattée and fleurs-de-lis and has four half-arches, surmounted with a monde and cross pattée.

Mary's diadem was set with 177 diamonds, 78 pearls, 1 sapphire, 1 emerald, and 1 ruby; it now contains artificial gemstones and cultured pearls. It is 8 centimetres (3.1 in) tall and weighs 300 grams (0.66 lb).

Originally, the coronation crown weighed 600 grams (1.3 lb) and was set with 419 diamonds, 46 large pearls, 7 rubies, 7 sapphires, and 2 emeralds.

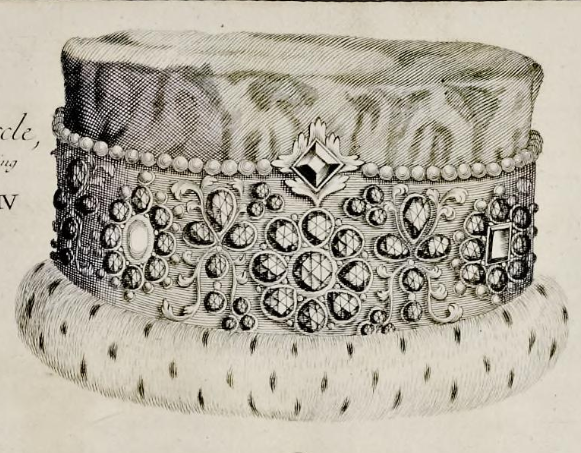
The queen's diadem, circle or circlet

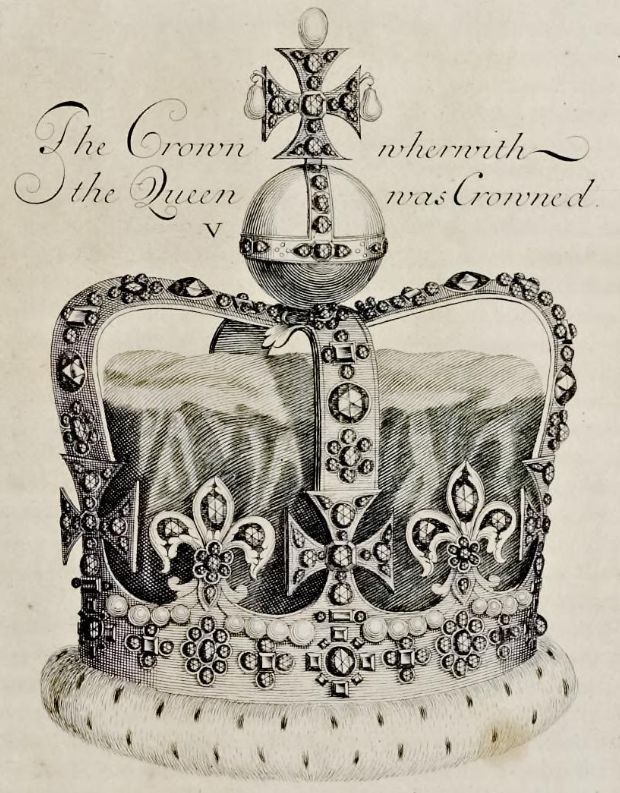
The queen's coronation crown

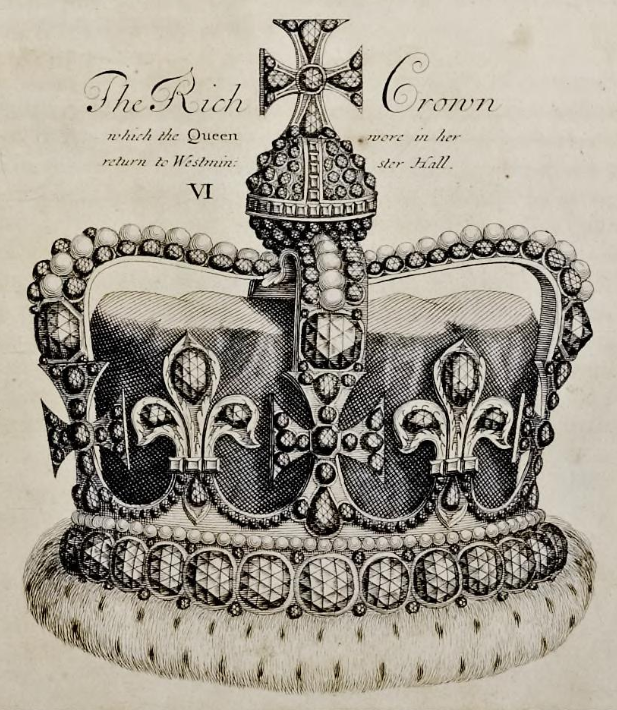
The queen's state crown or 'rich crown'

The three crowns created for Mary's 1685 coronation, published in Francis Sandford's 1687 account of the coronation of James II and Mary

== Usage ==
The coronation crown was subsequently used by queens regnant Mary II and Anne; and by queens consort Caroline of Ansbach and Charlotte of Mecklenburg-Strelitz.

The state crown was entirely remade for the coronation of Mary II, which included the addition of the Black Prince's Ruby for the occasion, while her husband, William III, wore the State Crown of Charles II. It was subsequently worn by Anne, by George I in preference to Charles II's state crown, perhaps because Mary of Modena's State Crown was easier to wear over a full-bottomed wig, and then by Caroline. Although Queen Charlotte wore the coronation crown at her crowning, she used her own nuptial crown, given to her as a wedding gift by George III, as her state crown. (Note: Now part of the Hanovarian regalia) In 1831, the state crown was judged to be too theatrical and in a poor state of repair, and so a new crown was made for Queen Adelaide. However, it is possible that Adelaide was crowned using one of Mary of Modena's crowns at her coronation.

The state crown and diadem are now on display at the Jewel House at the Tower of London. The empty coronation crown was acquired from a private dealer by the Museum of London in 1956. It had been sent to the Crown Jewellers, Rundell & Bridge, for maintenance work in the 19th century, but was never returned to the royal family.

== Gallery ==
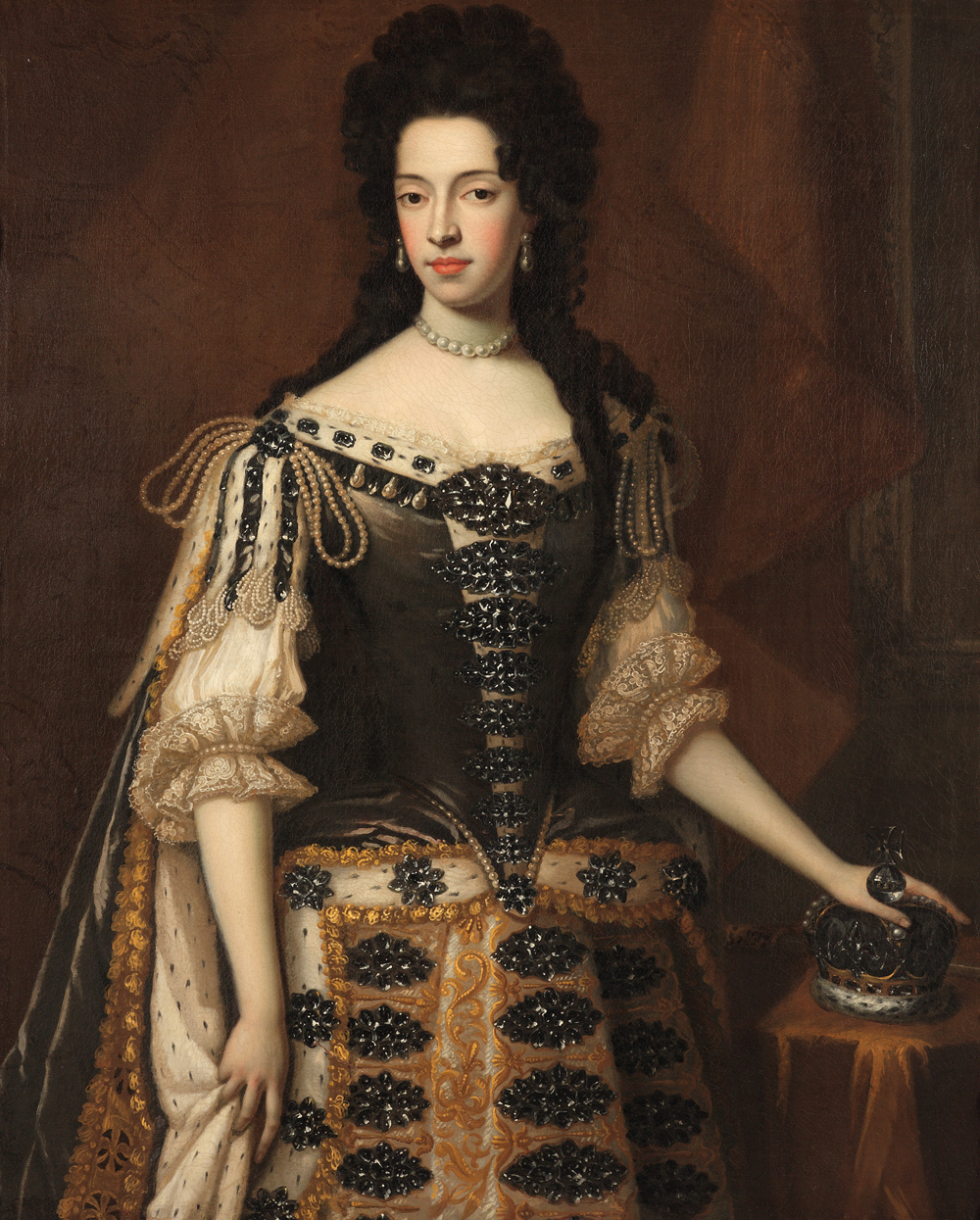
Mary of Modena with the crown, 1687

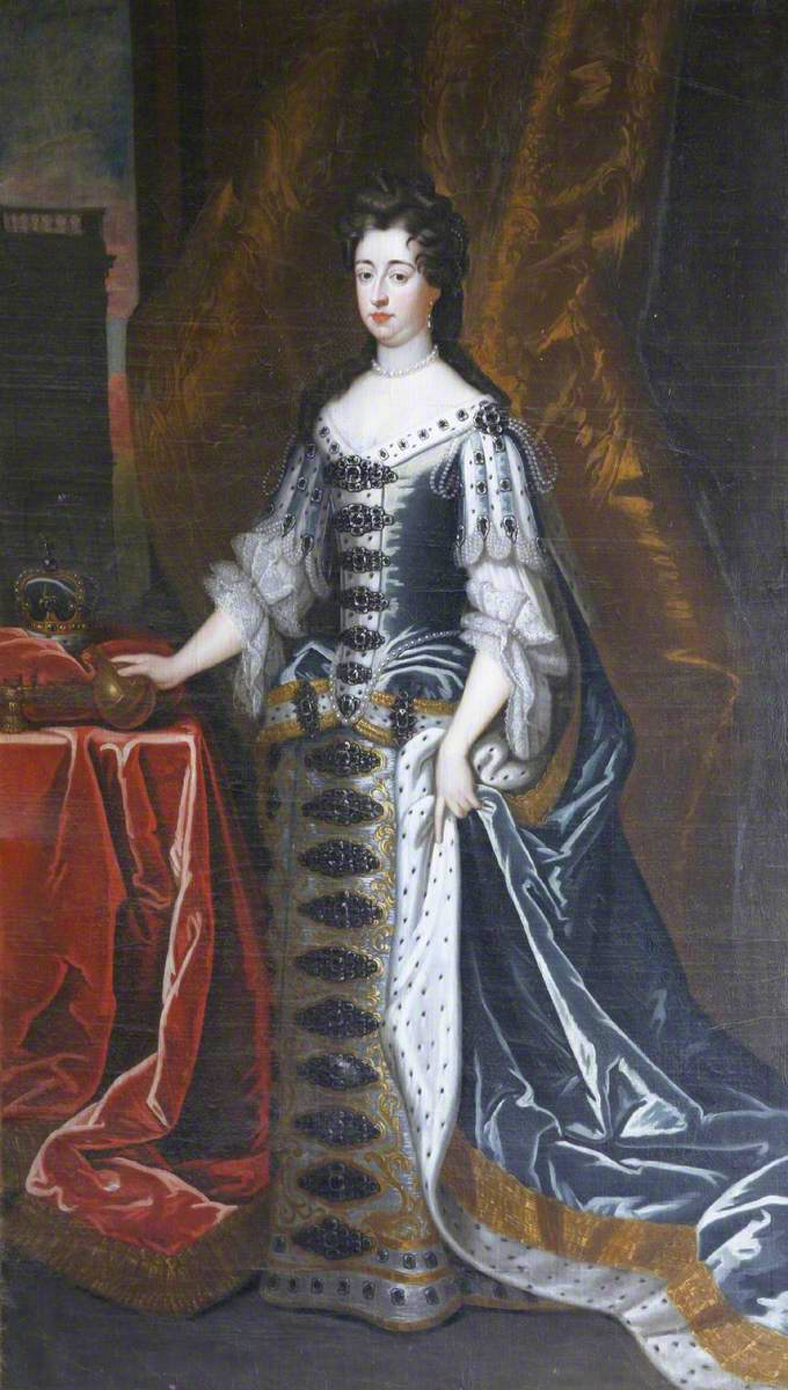
Mary of Modena, 17th century

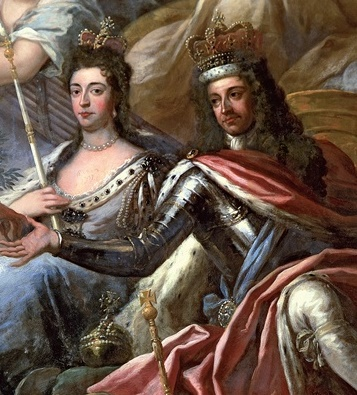
Queen Mary in the Mary of Modena's state crown, with William III in the State Crown of Charles II

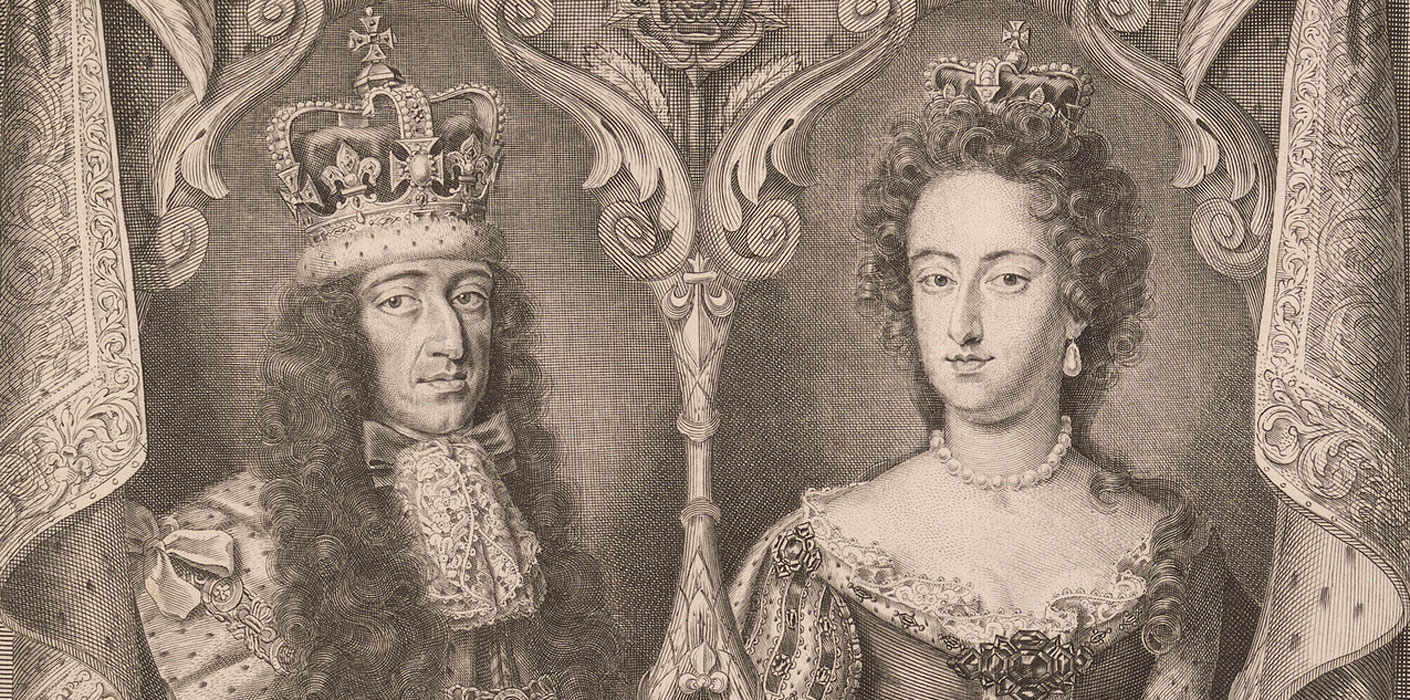
Queen Mary in the Mary of Modena's state crown

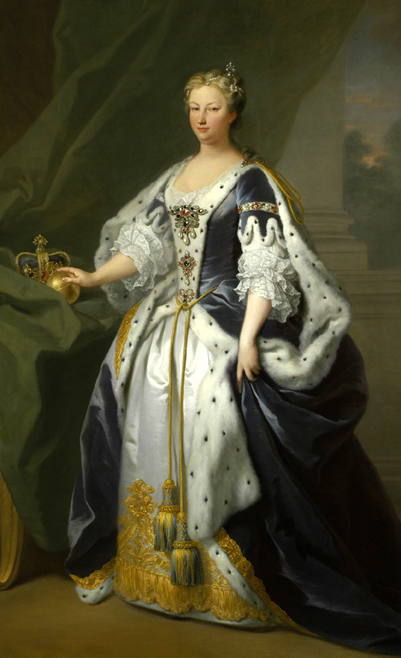
Queen Caroline, 17th century

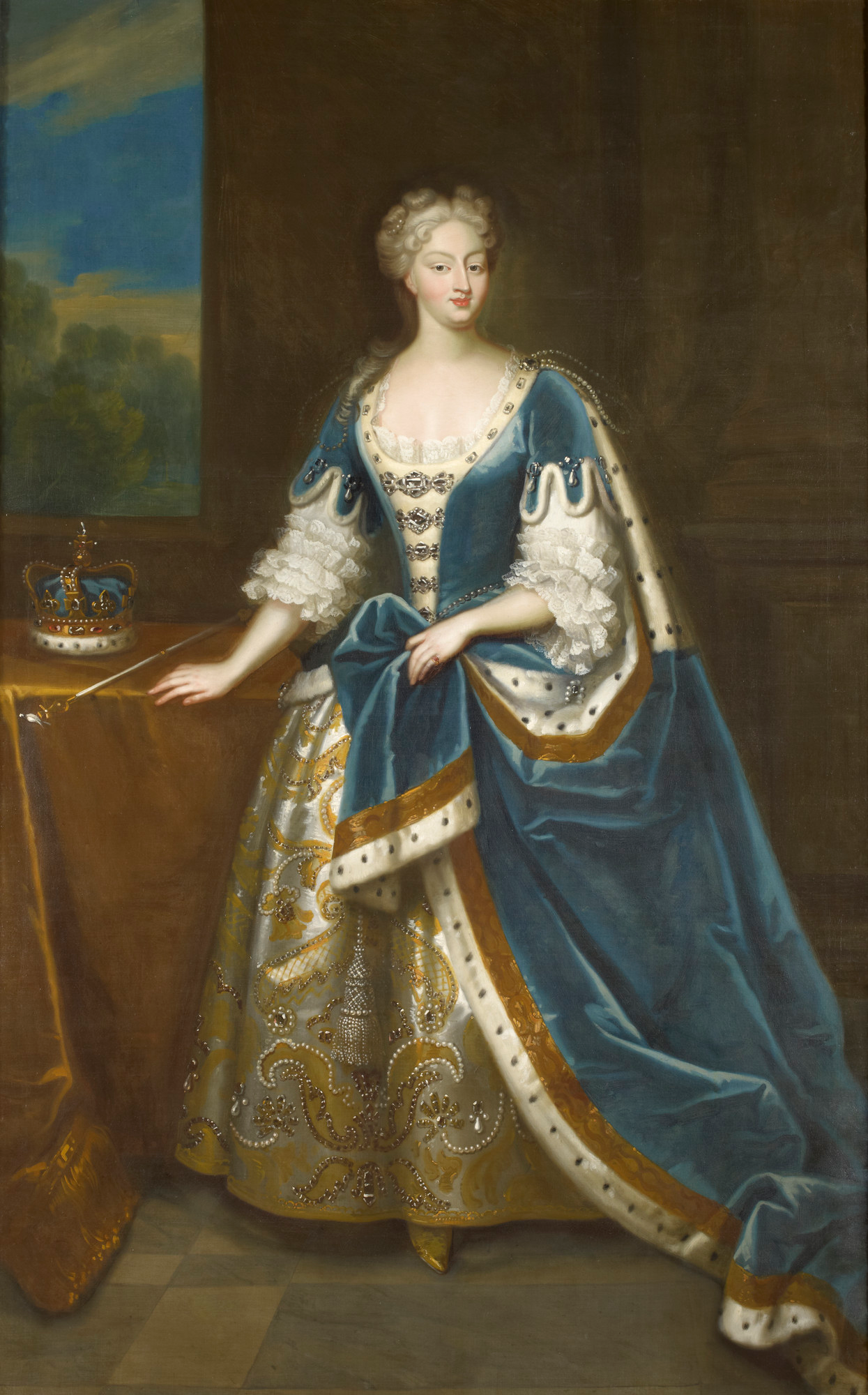
Queen Caroline, 17th century, circa 1730

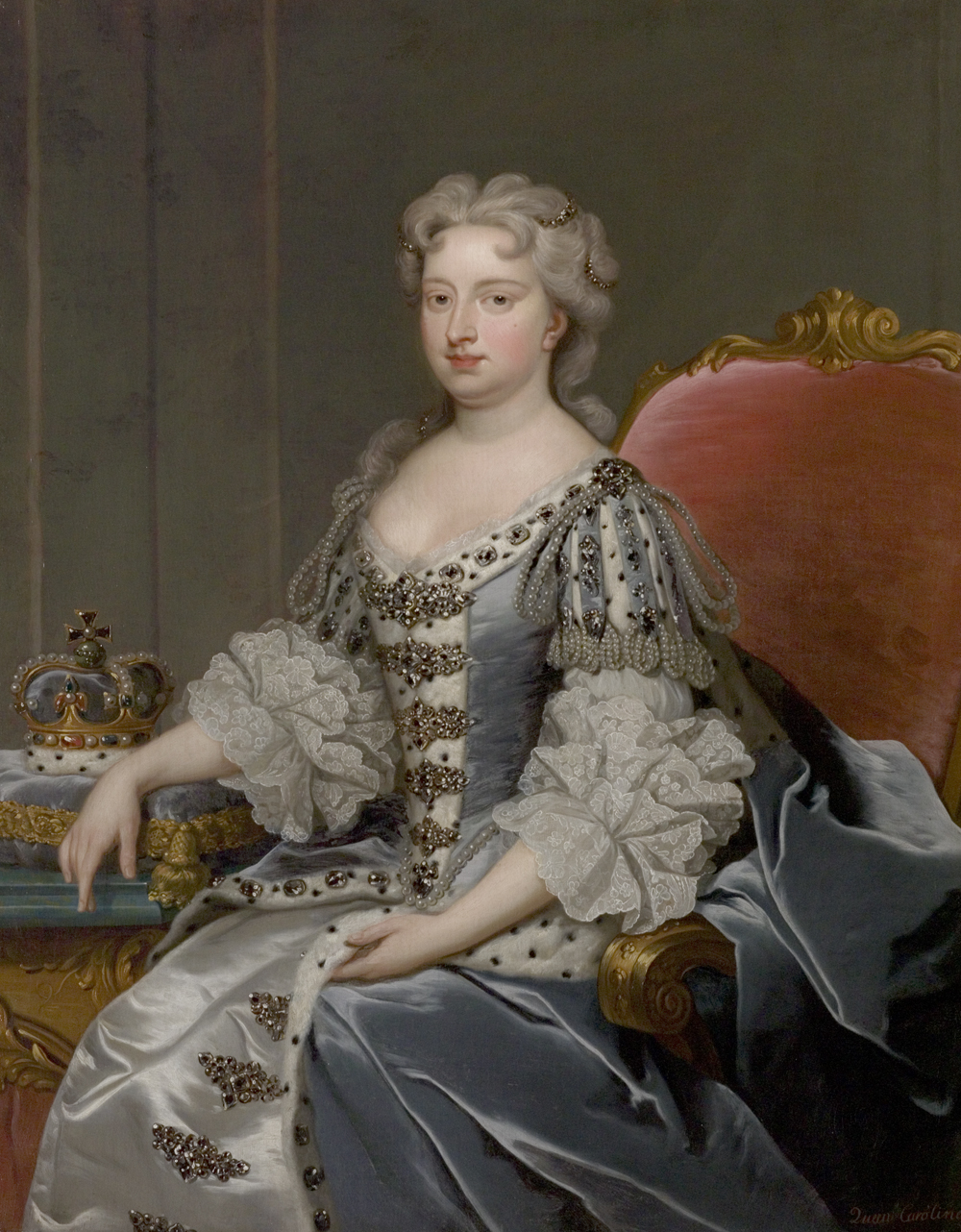
Queen Caroline, 17th century, circa 1730

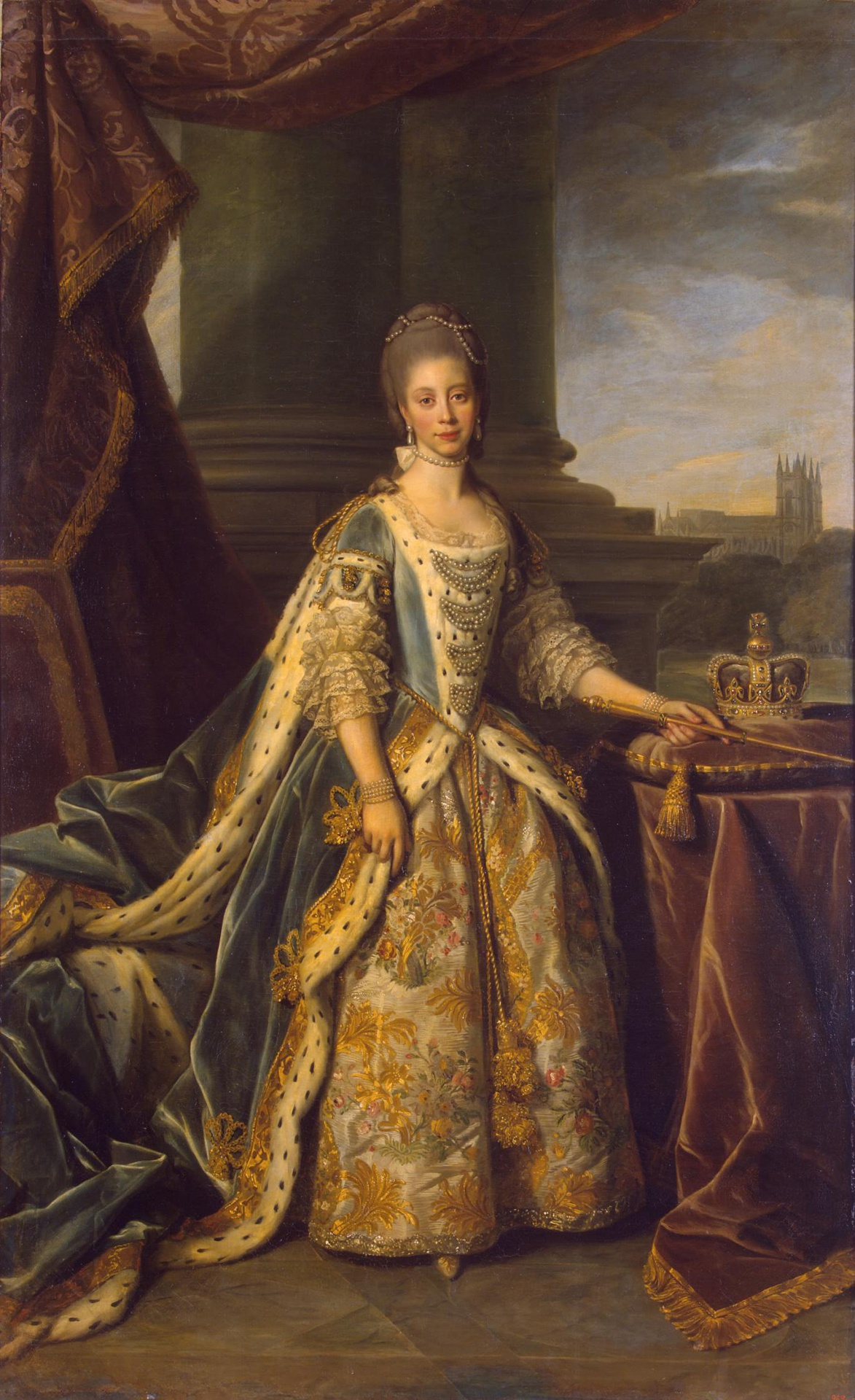
Queen Charlotte with the crown, 1773

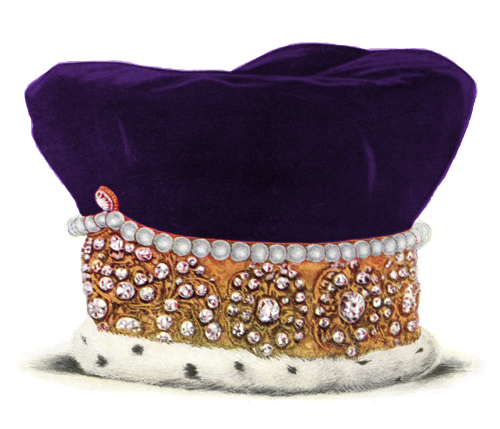
Mary's diadem

== See also ==
- Crown of Queen Elizabeth the Queen Mother
- Crown of Queen Camilla (known as the Crown of Queen Mary until 2025)
- Crown of Queen Alexandra

== Bibliography ==
- Bird, Rufus; Clayton, Martin, eds. (2017). Charles II: Art and Power. Royal Collection Trust. ISBN 978-1-909741-44-7.
- Dixon-Smith, Sally; Edwards, Sebastian; Kilby, Sarah; Murphy, Clare; Souden, David; Spooner, Jane; Worsley, Lucy (2010). The Crown Jewels: Souvenir Guidebook. Historic Royal Palaces. ISBN 978-1-873993-13-2.
- Keay, Anna (2011). The Crown Jewels. Thames & Hudson. ISBN 978-0-500-51575-4.
- Mears, Kenneth J.; Thurley, Simon; Murphy, Claire (1994). The Crown Jewels. Historic Royal Palaces. ASIN B000HHY1ZQ.
- Rose, Tessa (1992). The Coronation Ceremony and the Crown Jewels. HM Stationery Office. ISBN 978-0-117-01361-2.
- Twining, Edward Francis (1960). A History of the Crown Jewels of Europe. B. T. Batsford. ASIN B00283LZA6.
