= Crown of Queen Camilla =

British crown made in 1911

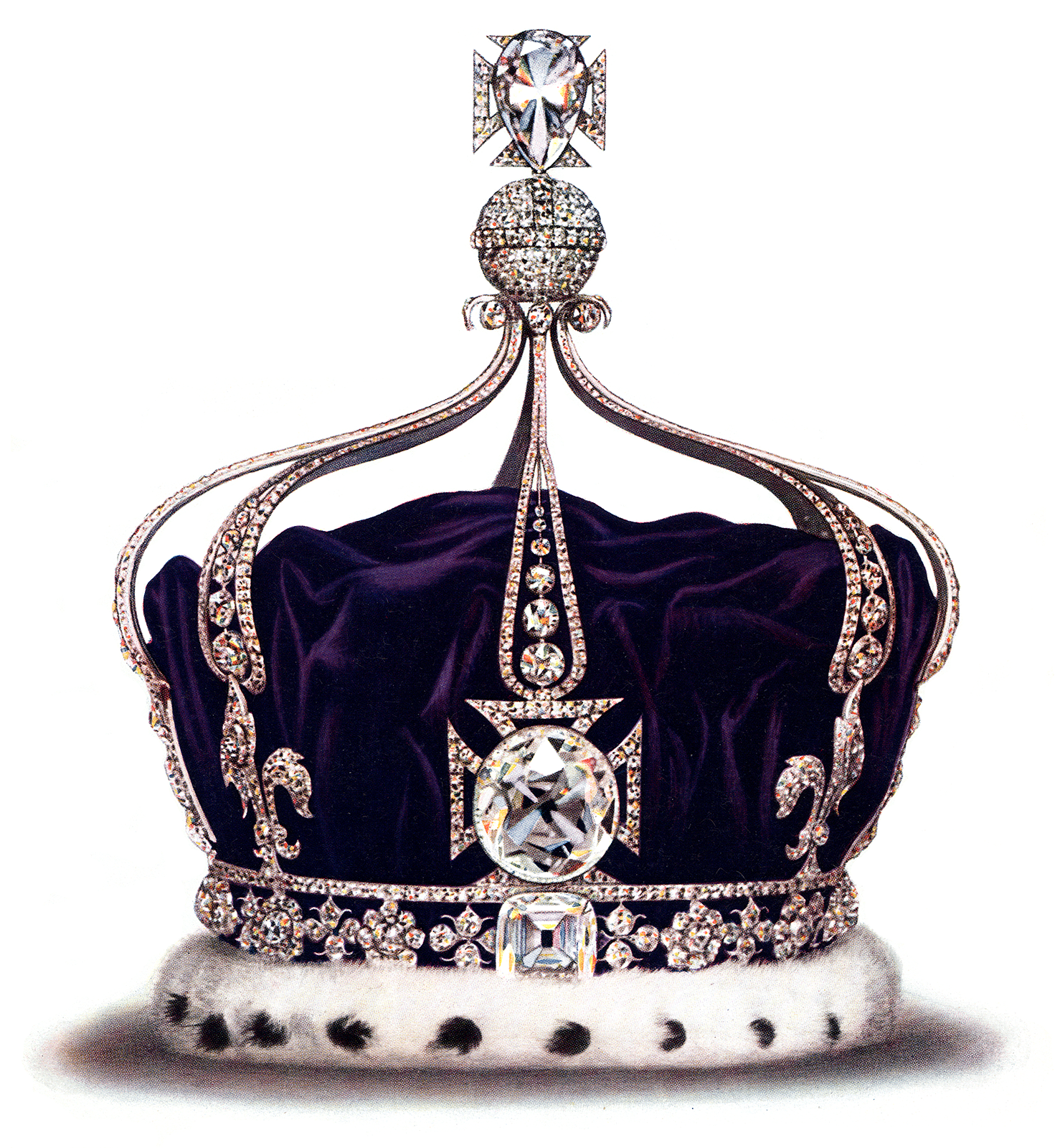
- Hand-coloured photograph of the crown published in 1919

Details
- Country: United Kingdom
- Made: 1911
- Owner: Charles III in right of the Crown
- Weight: 590 g (1.30 lb)
- Arches: Up to eight half-arches
- Material: Gold, silver
- Cap: Purple velvet trimmed with ermine band
- Notable stones: Koh-i-Noor (removed), Cullinan III, Cullinan IV, Cullinan V
- Other elements: 2,200 diamonds

The Crown of Queen Camilla, known until 2025 as the Crown of Queen Mary, is a consort crown and one of the crown jewels of the United Kingdom. It was made in 1911 for the coronation of British queen Mary of Teck. Mary thereafter wore it on occasion in circlet form. It was used again, in an altered form, at the coronation of Queen Camilla in 2023.

== Description ==
=== Queen Mary ===
Queen Mary bought the Art Deco-inspired crown from Garrard & Co. out of her own pocket hoping it would become an heirloom worn by future queens consort. It is somewhat unusual for a British crown in that it has eight half-arches instead of the more typical four half-arches or two arches.

It is 25 cm (9.8 in) tall and weighs 590 g (1.30 lb). The silver-gilt crown has around 2,200 rose-cut and brilliant-cut diamonds, and originally contained the 105.6-carat (21.12 g) Koh-i-Noor diamond, as well as the 94.4-carat (18.88 g) Cullinan III and 63.6-carat (12.72 g) Cullinan IV diamonds.

In 1914, those diamonds were replaced with crystal replicas for public display, and the crown's arches were made detachable so it could be worn as an open crown. Mary wore it like this after her husband, George V, died in 1936. In 1937, the year of George VI's coronation, the 18.8-carat (3.76 g), heart-shaped Cullinan V was first added to the crown in place of the Koh-i-Noor, which was removed for use on the Crown of Queen Elizabeth the Queen Mother.

=== Queen Camilla ===
Queen Camilla was crowned using the crown at her coronation in May 2023. Prior to the coronation the crown was partially altered by the Crown Jewellers, Mappin and Webb. Alterations included re-setting the crown with the original Cullinan III and IV diamonds, as well as Cullinan V in place of the controversial Koh-i-Noor, as a tribute to Camilla's mother-in-law, Elizabeth II, who wore the diamonds as brooches. The number of arches was reduced from eight to four and the crown fitted with a new purple velvet cap. It was the first time since the eighteenth century that a British queen consort reused the crown of a predecessor. In January 2025, the crown was officially renamed Queen Camilla's Crown.

== Gallery ==
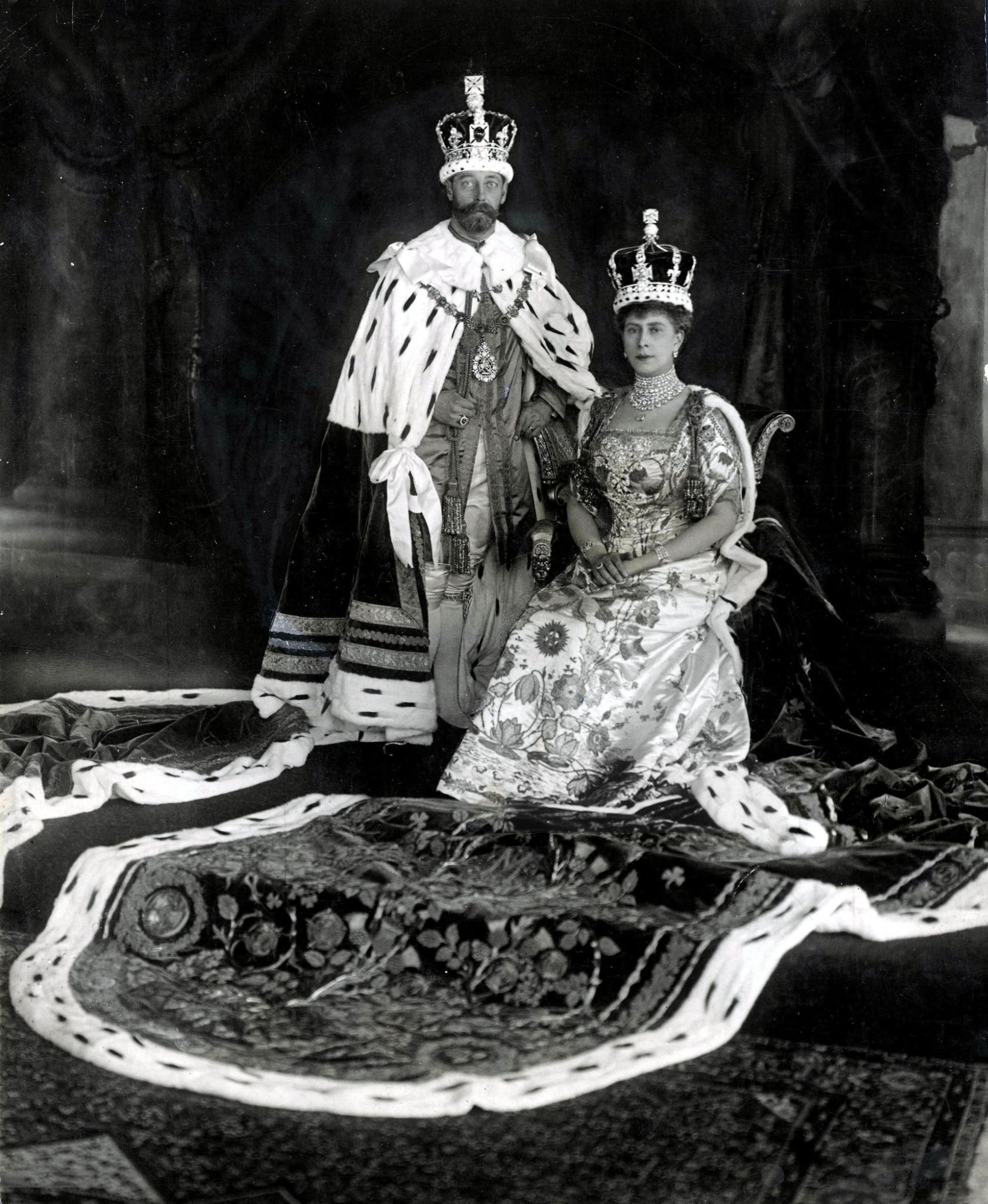
Queen Mary wearing the crown in a coronation photograph, 1911

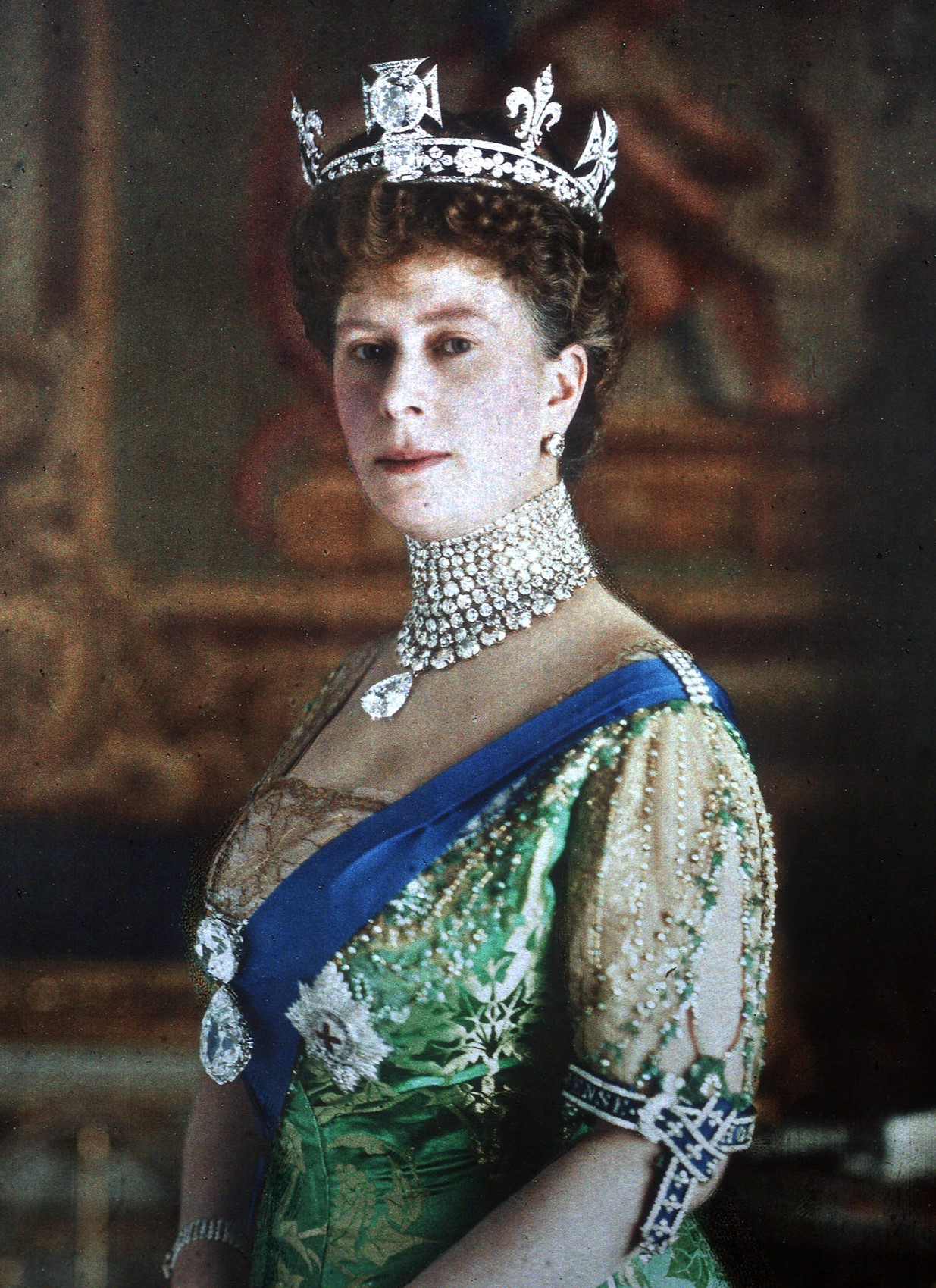
Queen Mary wearing the crown without arches, bonnet, or ermine, 1914

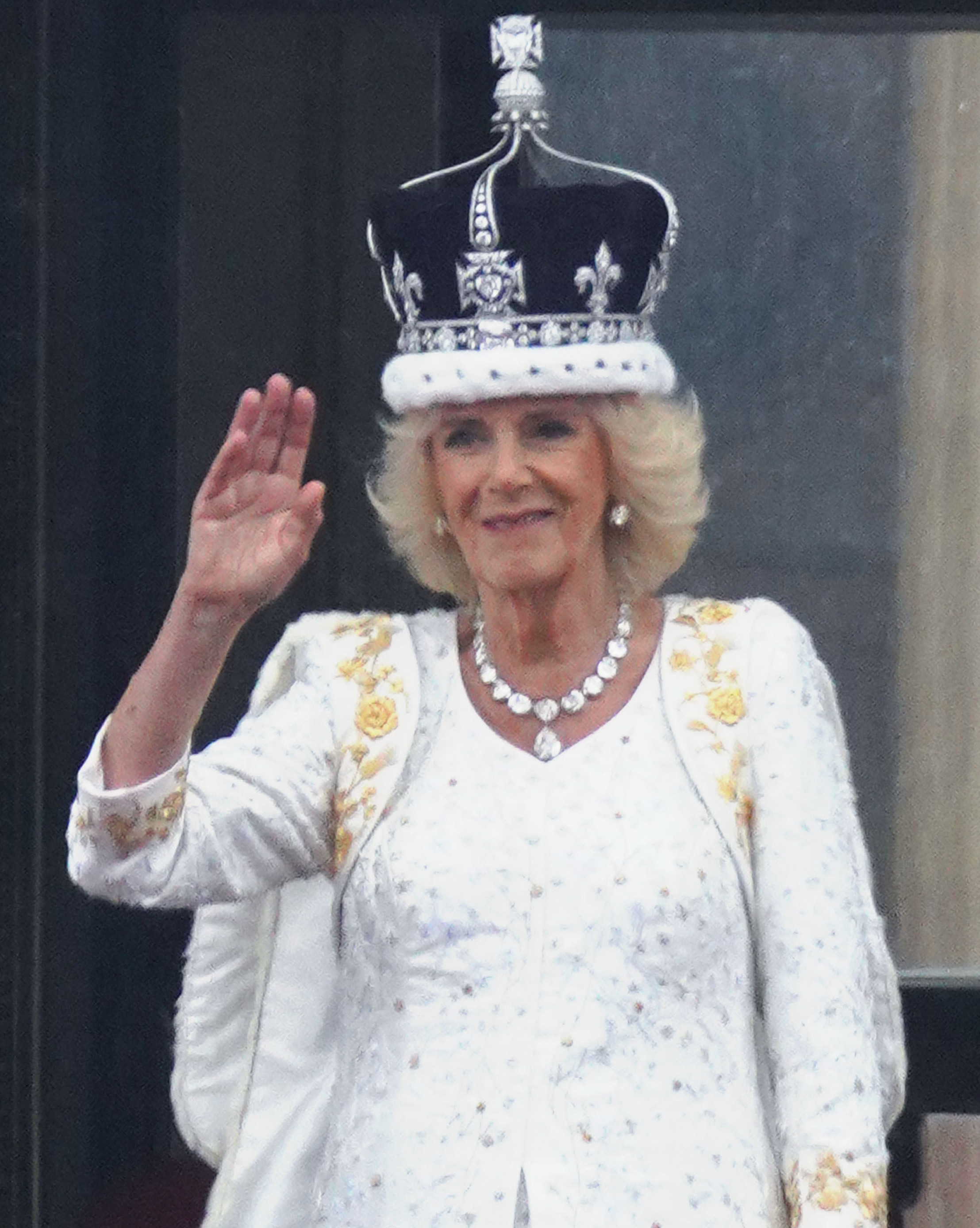
Queen Camilla wearing the altered crown at her coronation, 2023

== See also ==
- Crown of Mary of Modena
- Crown of Queen Adelaide
- Crown of Queen Alexandra
- Crown of Queen Elizabeth the Queen Mother
