= Crown of Queen Adelaide =

British crown made in 1831

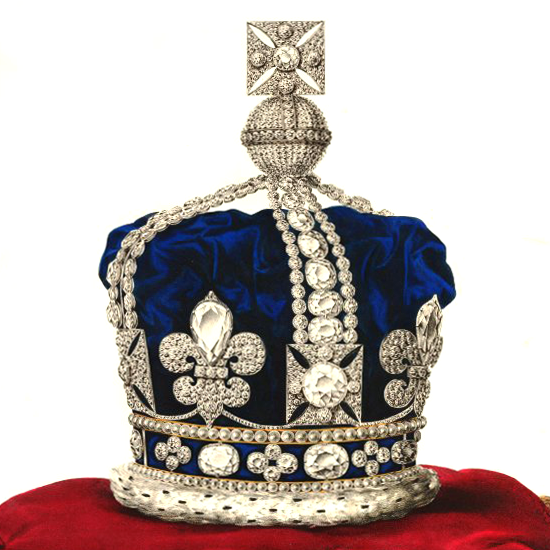
- Lithograph of the crown

Details
- Country: United Kingdom
- Made: 1831
- Owner: Charles III in right of the Crown
- Arches: 4

The Crown of Queen Adelaide was the consort crown of the British queen Adelaide of Saxe-Meiningen. It was used at Adelaide's coronation in 1831. It was emptied of its jewels soon afterwards, and has not been worn since. In the late 20th century, it was reacquired for the Royal Collection.

== Reasons for creation ==
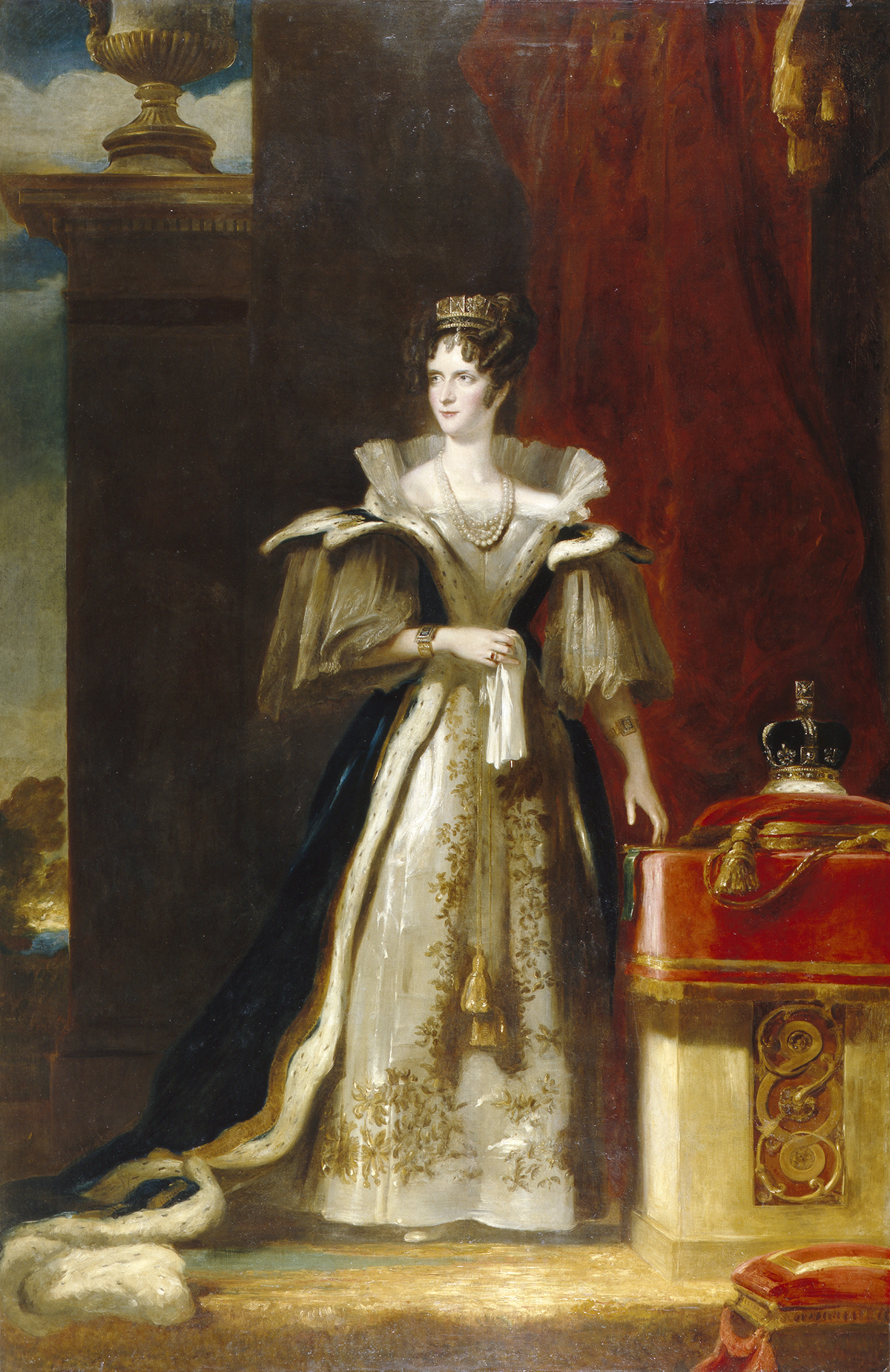
Queen Adelaide depicted with her crown, by John Simpson

Following the coronation of Mary of Modena in 1685, the crown made for Mary was used for the coronations of Queen Mary II in 1689, Queen Anne in 1702 and Queen Caroline in 1727. However criticism of the continued use of this crown had mounted, for reasons of age, size, state of repair and because it was seen to be too theatrical and undignified. A specially made nuptial crown was used by Queen Charlotte, but in the preparations for the coronation of Adelaide of Saxe-Meiningen in 1831 Adelaide expressed a dislike for the crowns in the royal collection, it was ruled that the Modena crown was "unfit for Her Majesty's use". Plans were made for the creation of a new consort crown.

== Design ==
The new crown followed British crown tradition in having four half arches, meeting a globe, on top of which sat a cross. The Queen had objected to the standard practice of hiring diamonds and jewels for a crown prior to its use. Instead diamonds from her own private jewellery were installed in her new crown. Following the coronation, the diamonds were all removed, and the crown stored as a shell.

== Subsequent history ==
From Adelaide until Elizabeth Bowes-Lyon, all British queens consort had their own special consort crown made for them, rather than wearing the crowns of any of their predecessors. Later consort crowns were made for Alexandra of Denmark (1902), Mary of Teck (1911) and Elizabeth Bowes-Lyon (1937). Camilla Shand was the first queen consort to wear the crown of a predecessor, that of Mary of Teck (albeit modified), since before Queen Adelaide.

Emptied of its jewels and discarded by the royal family, the crown was loaned to the Museum of London by the Amherst family from 1933 until 1985. It was purchased by the jewellers Asprey in 1987. Jefri Bolkiah, Prince of Brunei, brother of the Sultan of Brunei, bought Asprey in November 1995 and presented the crown to the United Kingdom, along with the Coronation Crown of George IV, State Crown of George I, and Coronation Bible of George III. Earlier that year it had been valued at £425,000 for the purposes of an application to export the crown to the United States. The application was withdrawn during a review by the Reviewing Committee on the Export of Works of Art. It is now part of the Royal Collection. It was on public display in the Martin Tower at the Tower of London from 1996 until 2023.
