= Crown of Queen Elizabeth the Queen Mother =

British crown made in 1937

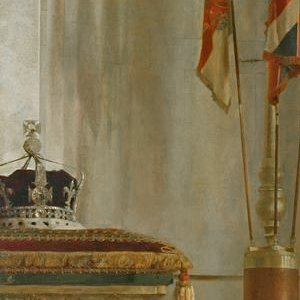
- The crown as it appears in a portrait by Sir Gerald Kelly

Details
- Country: United Kingdom
- Made: 1937
- Owner: Charles III in right of the Crown
- Arches: 4 half-arches
- Material: Platinum
- Notable stones: Koh-i-Noor
- Other elements: 2,800 diamonds

The Crown of Queen Elizabeth the Queen Mother, also known as the Queen Mother's Crown, is the crown made for Queen Elizabeth the Queen Mother to wear at her coronation in 1937 and State Openings of Parliament during the reign of her husband, King George VI. The crown was made by Garrard & Co., the Crown Jeweller at the time, and is modelled partly on the design of the Crown of Queen Mary, though it differs by having four half-arches instead of the eight that Queen Mary's Crown originally had. As with Queen Mary's Crown, its arches are detachable at the crosses pattée, allowing it to be worn either as a circlet or open crown. It is the only crown for a British king or queen to be made of pure platinum.

== Styling ==
The crown is decorated with about 2,800 diamonds, most notably the 105-carat (21.0 g) Koh-i-Noor in the middle of the front cross, which was acquired by the East India Company after the Anglo-Sikh Wars and presented to Queen Victoria in 1851, and a 17-carat (3.4 g) Turkish diamond given to her in 1856 by Abdulmejid I, sultan of the Ottoman Empire, as a gesture of thanks for British support in the Crimean War. The Koh-i-Noor became a part of the Crown Jewels when it was left to the Crown upon Victoria's death in 1901. It had been successively mounted in the crowns of Queen Alexandra and Queen Mary before it was transferred to the Queen Mother's crown. Most of the other diamonds originated from Queen Victoria's Regal Circlet.

== Usage ==
After the death of King George VI, Queen Elizabeth, known thereafter as the Queen Mother, did not wear the full crown, but wore it minus the arches as a circlet at the coronation of her daughter, Elizabeth II, in 1953.

In its full form, it was placed on top of the Queen Mother's coffin for her lying-in-state and funeral in 2002.

The crown is on public display along with the other Crown Jewels in the Jewel House at the Tower of London.

In September 2022, it was speculated that Queen Camilla could be crowned with this crown, although there was speculation that a different crown might be used due to controversy around the Koh-i-Noor after the Indian government said that Camilla wearing the diamond would evoke "painful memories of the colonial past". It was announced on 14 February 2023 that Queen Camilla would be crowned using the Crown of Queen Mary, without the Koh-i-Noor diamond.

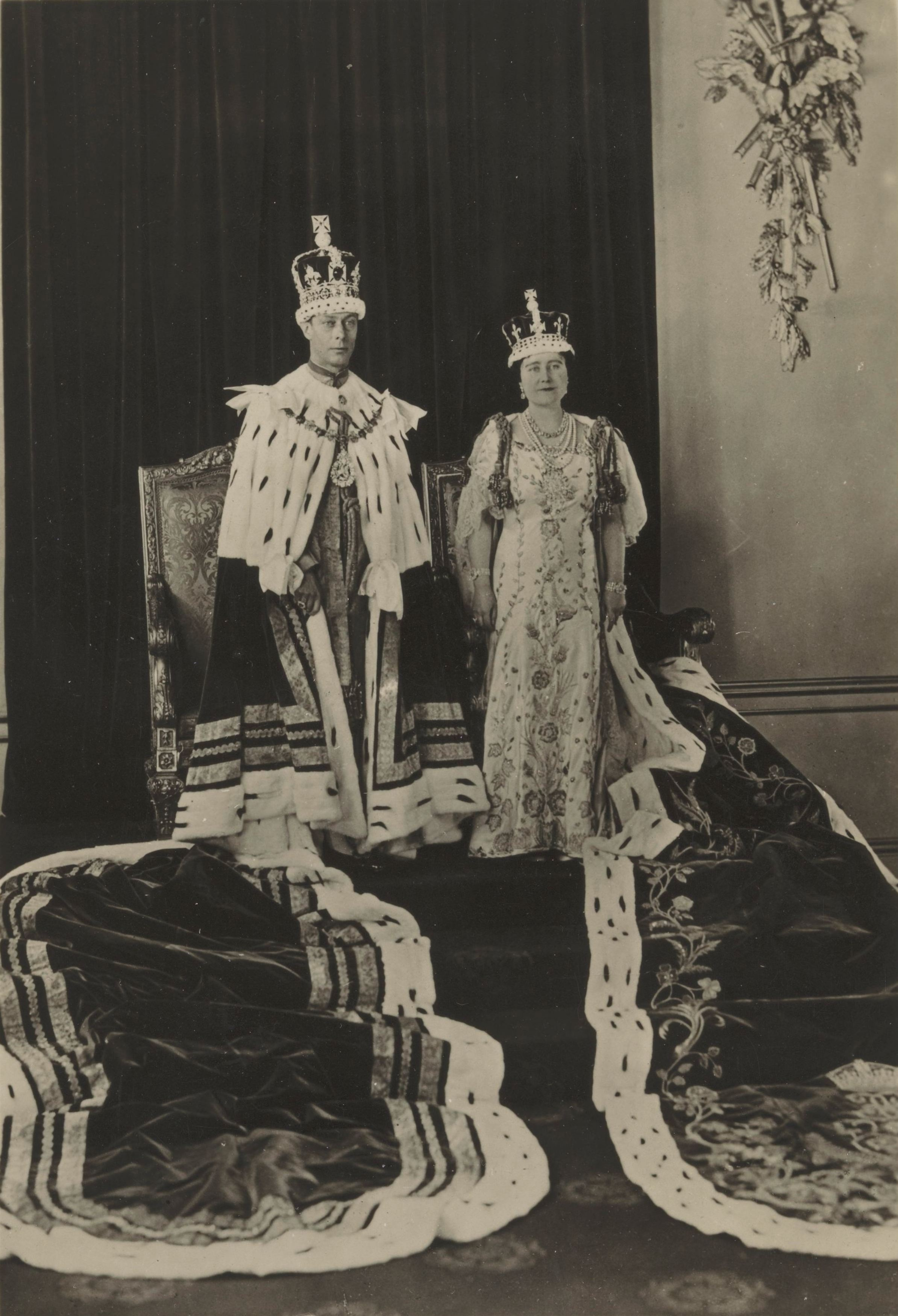
Queen Elizabeth wearing her crown in a formal coronation photograph, 1937

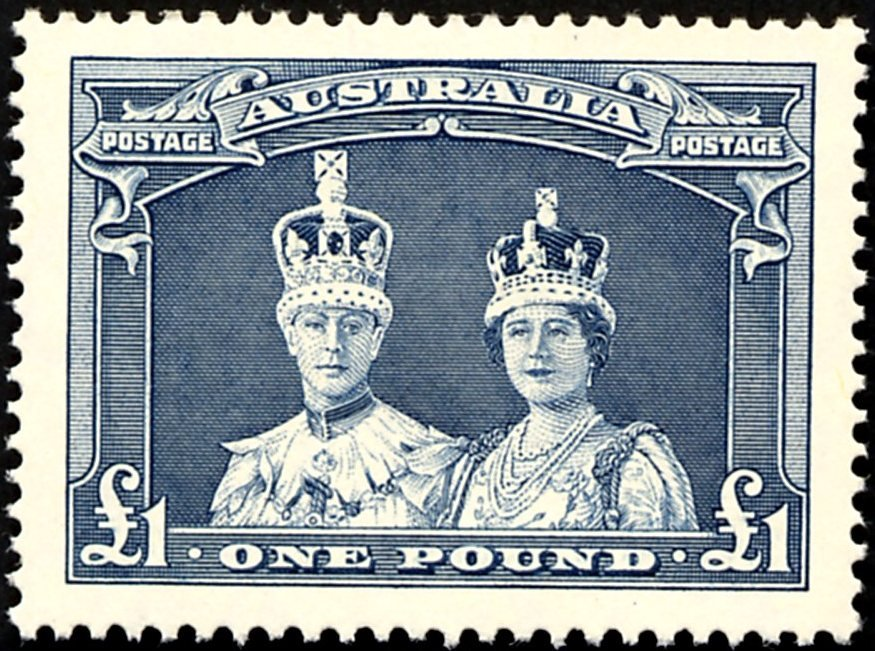
Queen Elizabeth depicted wearing her crown on an Australian stamp, 1938

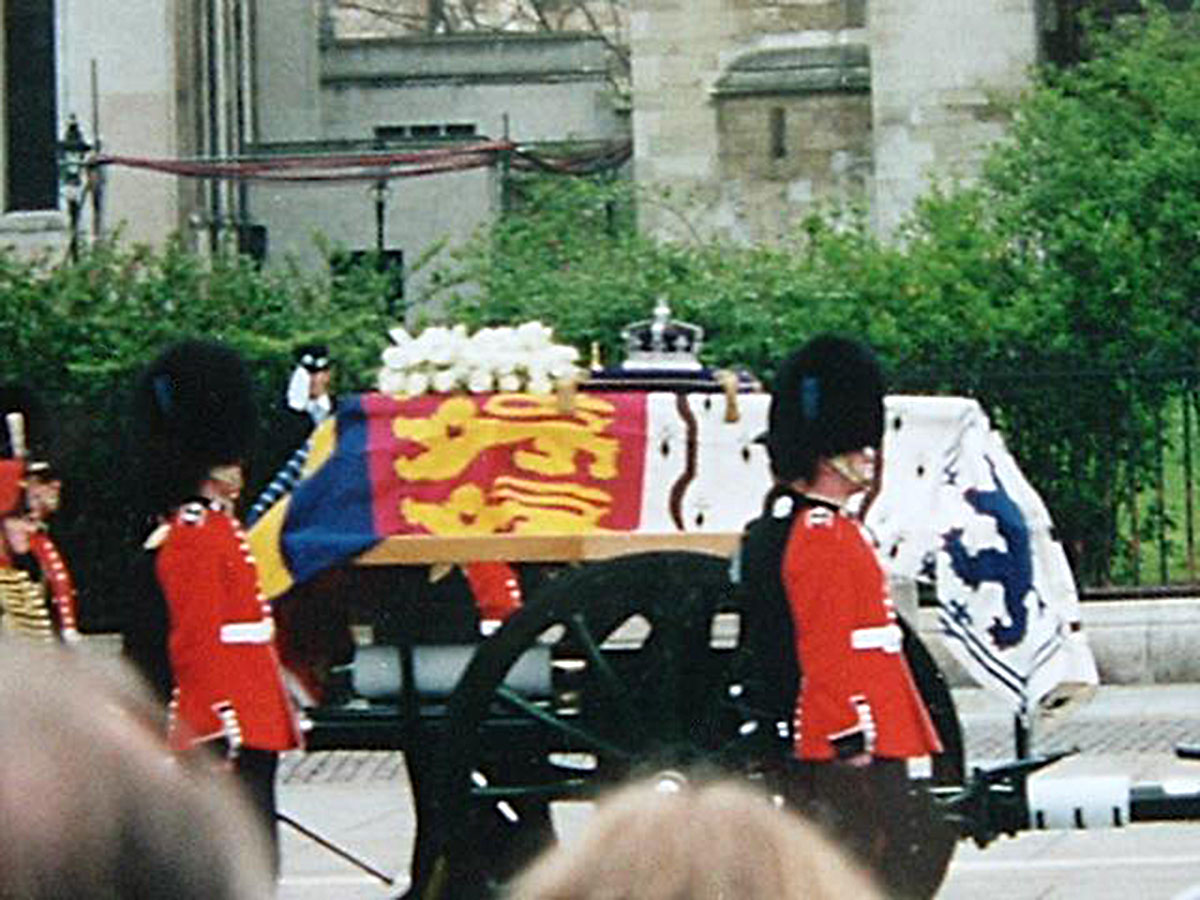
The crown placed atop the Queen Mother's coffin during her funeral procession in 2002

== See also ==
- List of British coronations
