= State Crown of Charles II =

English state crown

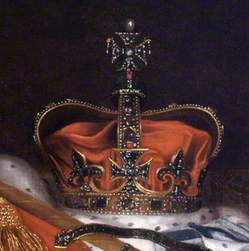
- The crown of state from a painting of the regalia of Charles II c.1670–1679

Details
- Country: Kingdom of England
- Made: 1661
- Destroyed: Reign of Queen Anne
- Arches: 2
- Cap: Purple velvet trimmed with ermine
- Notable stones: Diamonds, pearls, an aquamarine monde, the Black Prince's Ruby and other precious stones (as set under James II)
- Predecessors: Tudor Crown; Crown of James I
- Successors: State Crown of George I

The State Crown of Charles II was a state crown created for the coronation of Charles II of England in 1661. It was created to replace the Tudor Crown destroyed in the English Civil War. It was the subject of an attempted theft by Thomas Blood in 1671, and was broken up under the reign of Queen Anne.

== History ==
Following the abolition of the monarchy and the execution of Charles I in 1649, both the imperial and state crown of England (now known as the Tudor Crown) and the coronation crown (known as St Edward's Crown) were broken up and their valuable components sold or melted down into coin. With the restoration of the monarchy in 1660, Charles II ordered the creation of two new imperial crowns by Sir Robert Vyner to replace those lost.

On 13 May 1671, Colonel Thomas Blood made an unsuccessful attempt to steal the crown jewels from the Tower of London, flattening the state crown with a mallet in the process. Other accounts state that, in the struggle between Blood and his captor, Martin Beckman, 'the great pearl and a fair diamond fell off, and were lost for awhile with some other smaller stones; but the pearl was found by Catharine Maddox, a poor sweeping woman to one of the warders, and the diamond by a barber's apprentice; and both faithfully restored. Other smaller stones were by several persons picked up, and brought in... So that not any considerable thing was wanting, the crown only was bruised, and sent to be repaired.'

A slight alteration to the crown was made for the coronation of James II in 1685, and some further alterations were made for William III. (Note: William III wore the State Crown of Charles II while Mary II wore an entirely re-made State Crown of Mary of Modena) It was judged to be too heavy for Queen Anne and was dismantled and adjusted for her. She preferred to wear the smaller State Crown of Mary of Modena. Succeeding Hanoverian kings would wear the State Crown of George I, which some accounts claim is merely an altered State Crown of Charles II rather than a new crown.

== Description ==
Sir Edward Walker, who was Garter King of Arms under Charles II, provided a sketch of the crown in his account of the 1661 coronation, though it was not published until 1820. Cyril Davenport's The English Regalia, published in 1897, criticised Walker's illustration as 'of such an elementary character that little reliance can be placed on it'. A more accurate depiction can be seen in a contemporary painting of the regalia of Charles II, c.1670–1679.

The Lord Chamberlain's books record that the crown was 'refreshed and repaired' by Sir Robert Vyner for the coronation of James II, but otherwise little changed. Francis Sandford wrote The History of the Coronation of James II in 1687 which included a detailed drawing and description of the state crown under James II. He gave the following description:

The Crown of State, so called, because it is worn by the King at all such times as He comes in State to the Parliament-House. This was also new made against the Coronation of His late Majesty King Charles the Second, and was worn by the King in His Return to Westminster-Hall: It is exceeding Rich, being Imbellished [sic] with divers large Rose, or Faucet, and Table Diamonds, and other Precious Stones, besides a great quantity of Pearl; but it is most remarkable for a Wonderful large Ruby, set in the midle [sic] of one of the four Crosses, esteemed worth Ten Thousand Pounds, as also for that the Mound is one Entire, Stone, of a Sea-Water-Green Colour, known by the Name of an Agmarine [aquamarine]. The Cap was also of Purple Velvet, lined and turned up...

The ruby set in one of the four crosses, valued at £10,000 at the time, was the Black Prince's Ruby. The aquamarine monde survives in the emptied frame of George I's state crown and is on public display in the Jewel House at the Tower of London.

A new cross was made for the coronation of William III, and the shape of the frame was altered from circular to oval.

== Gallery ==
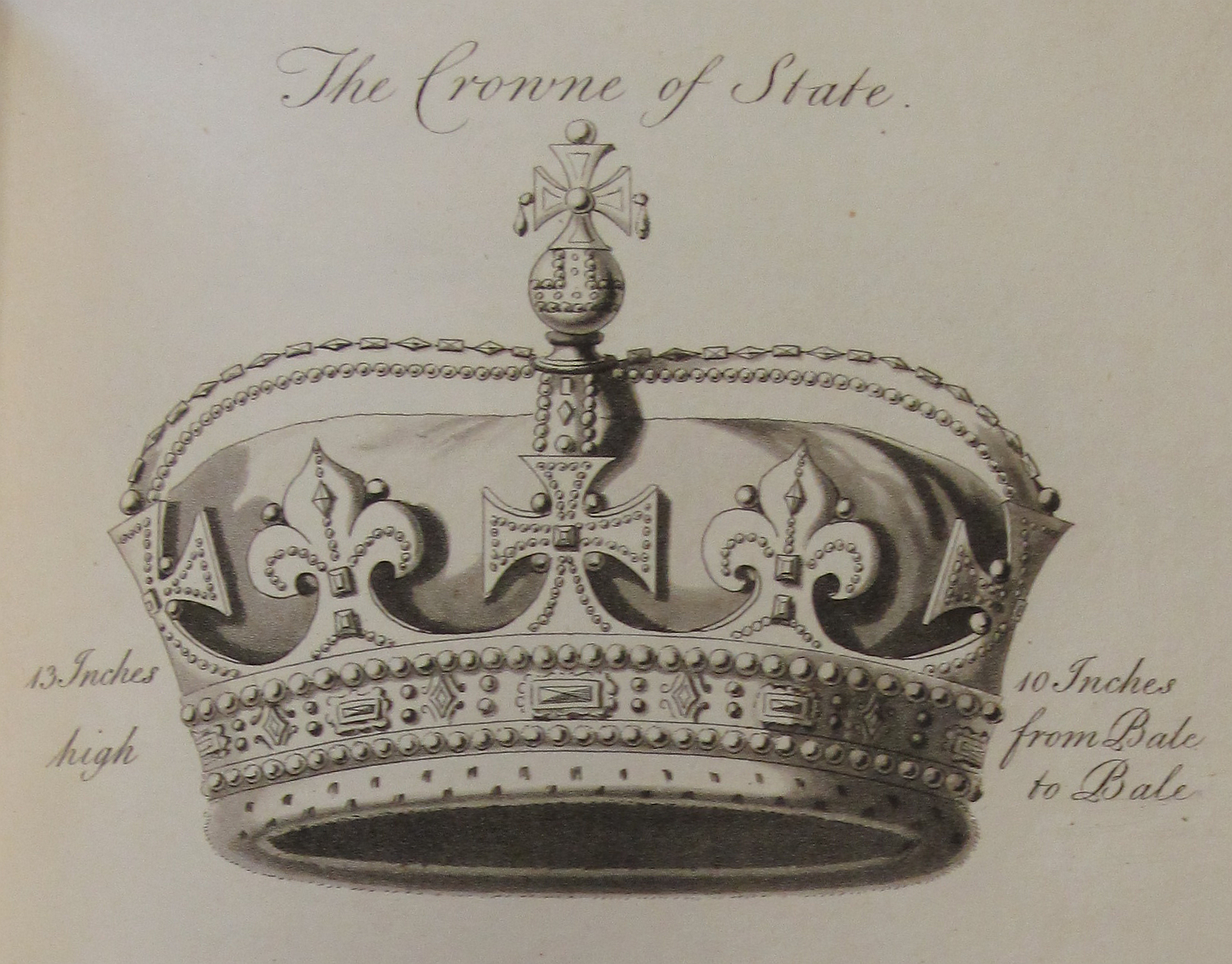
Sketch of the crown from an account of Charles II's coronation by Sir Edward Walker

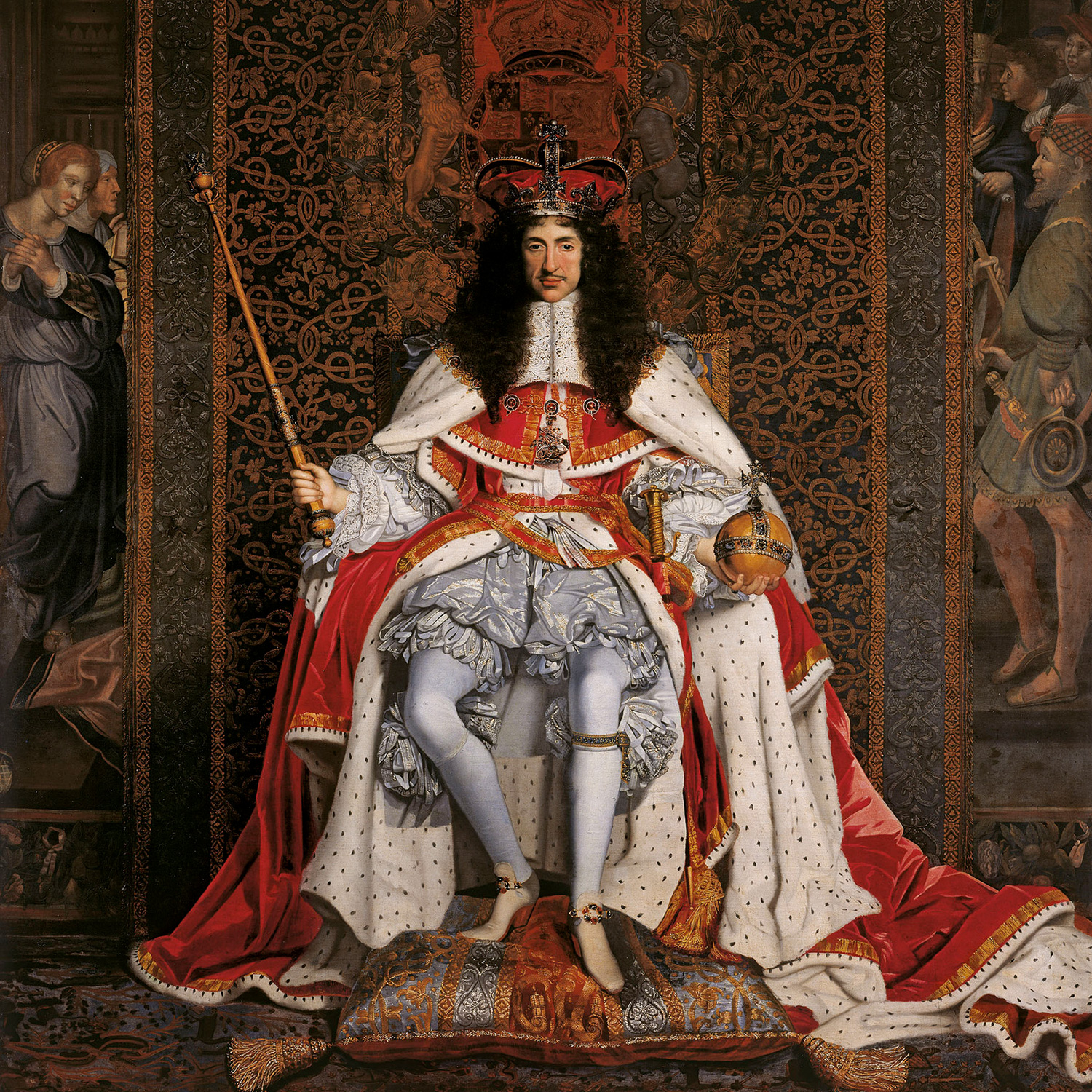
Charles II in coronation robes and wearing the state crown, circa 1661–1662

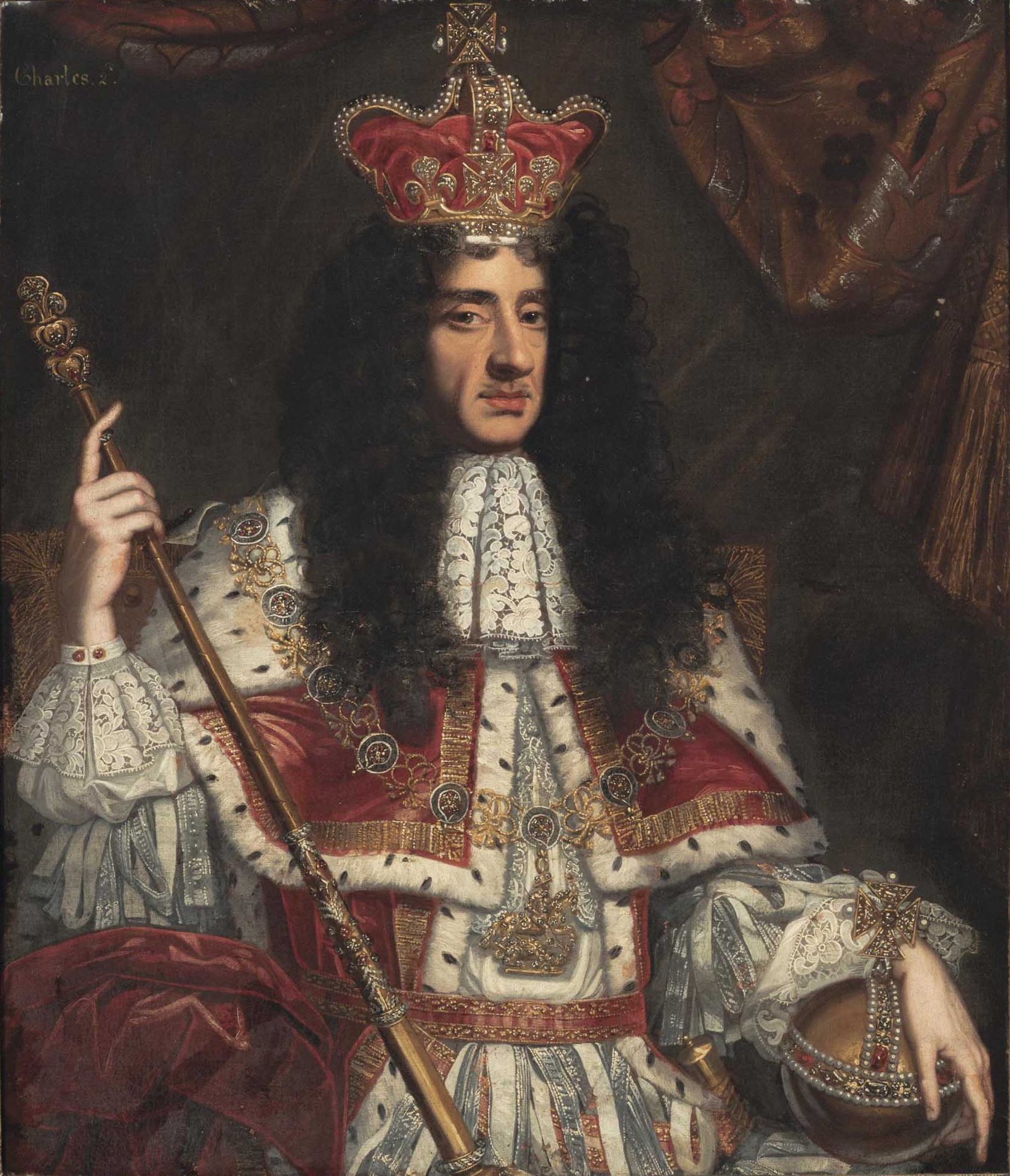
Charles II wearing the state crown, 1665

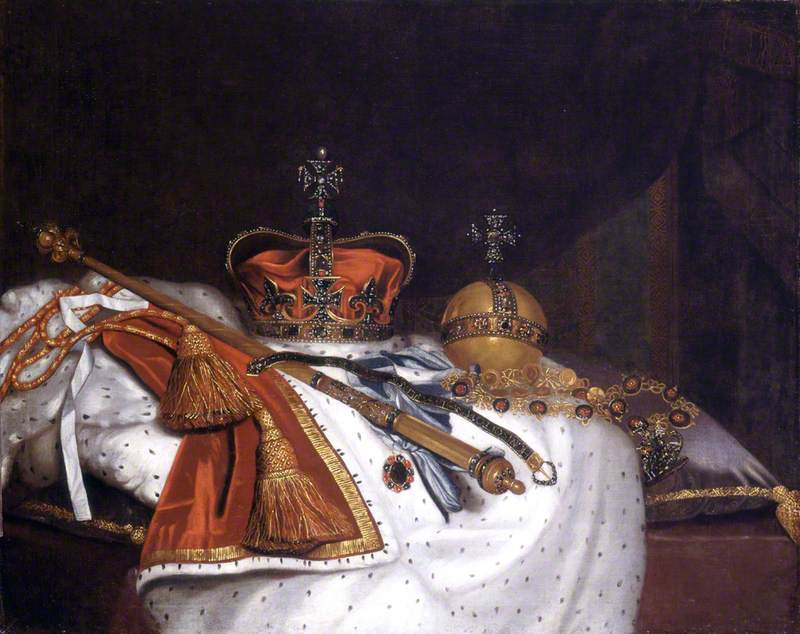
Regalia of Charles II, circa 1670–1679

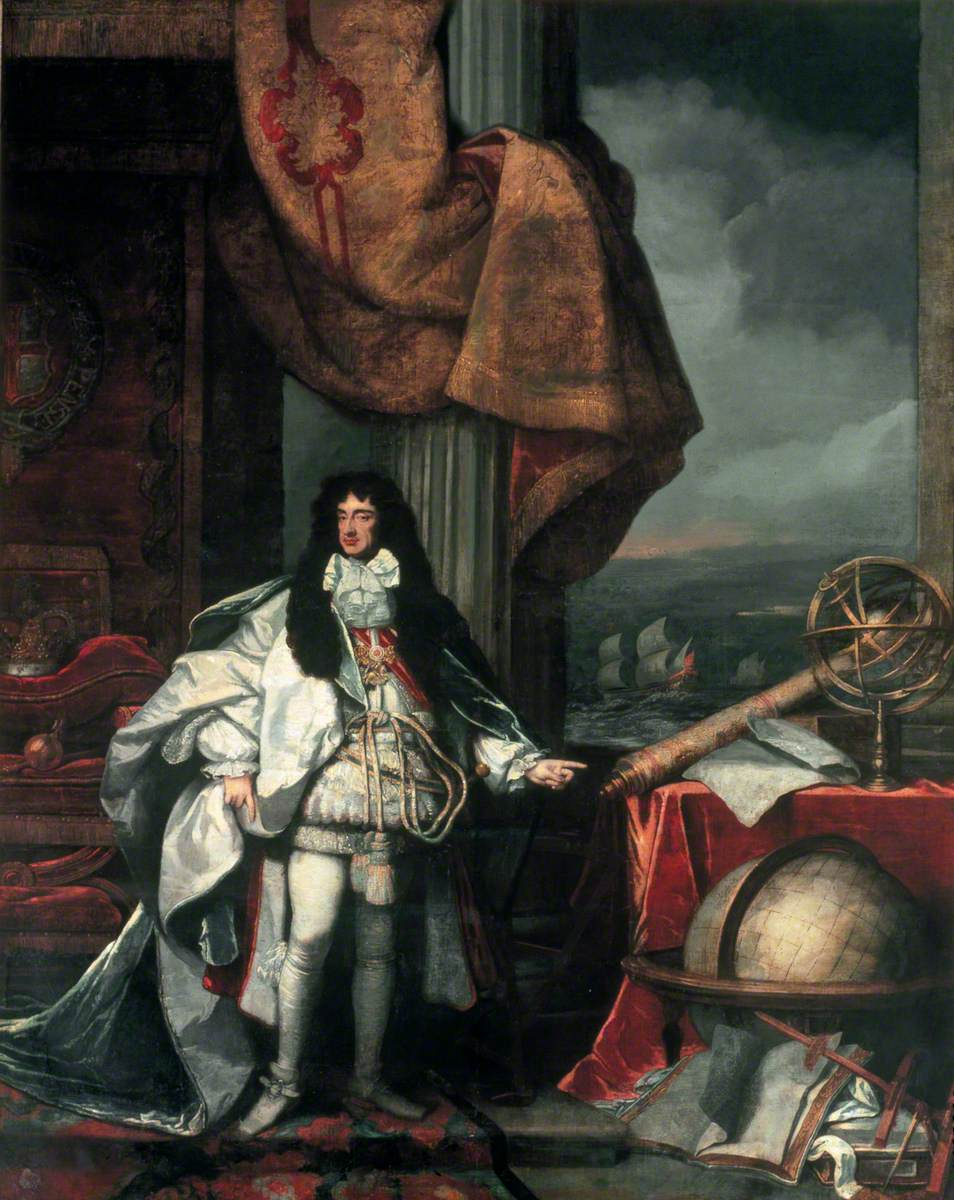
Charles II with the state crown

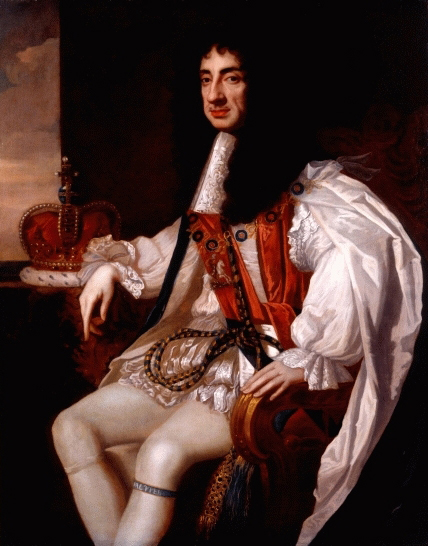
Charles II with the state crown, circa 1675

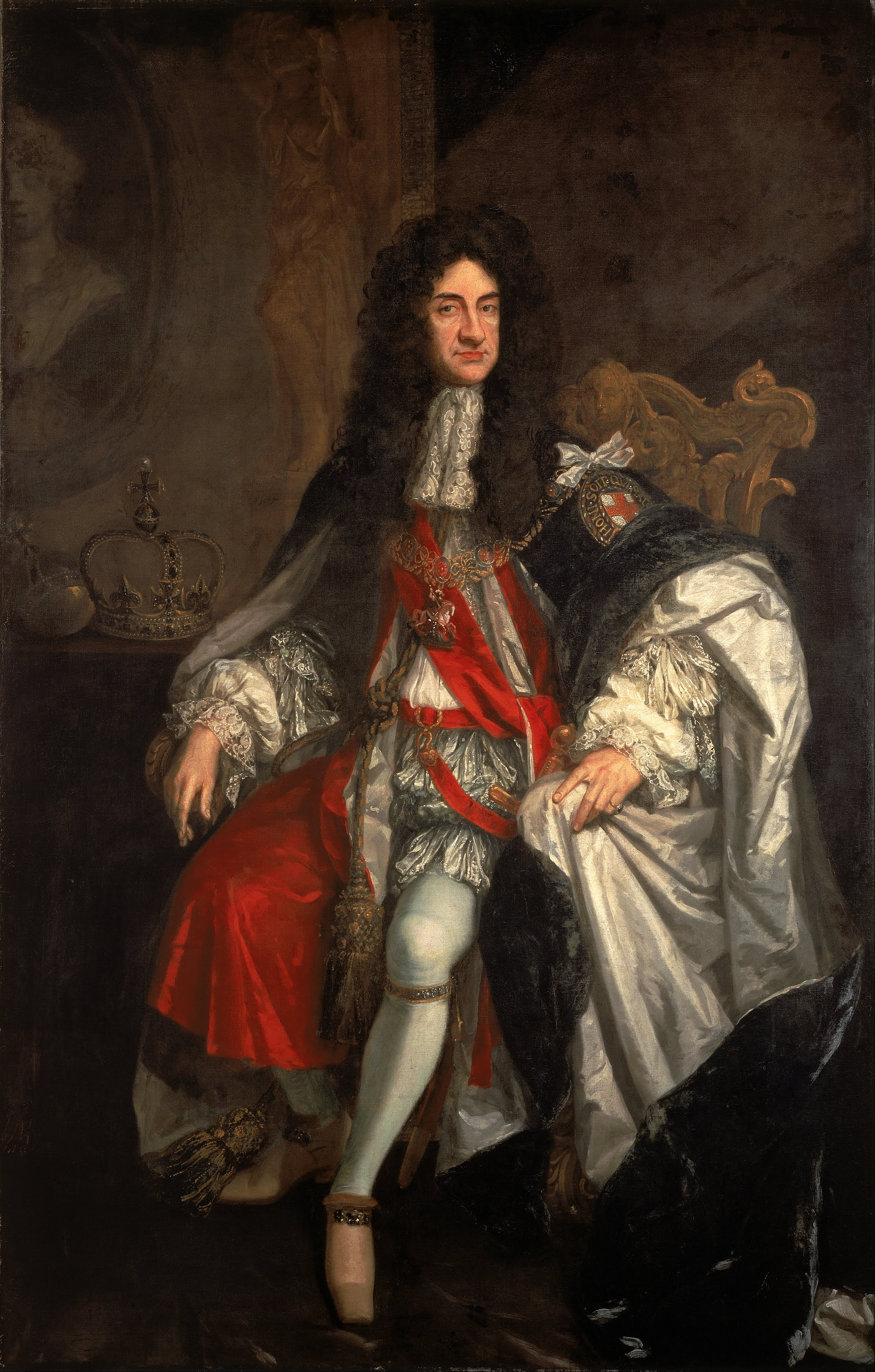
Charles II with the state crown, minus velvet cap, 1685

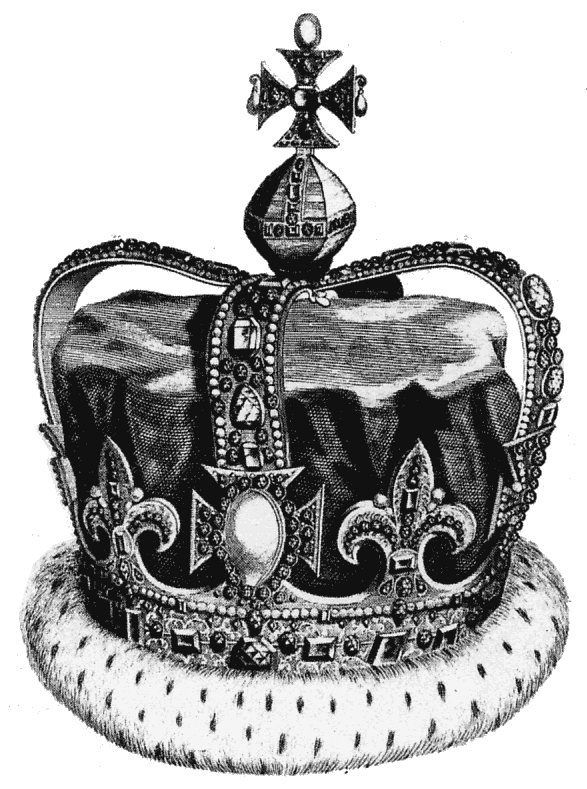
The crown as set for James II in 1685, from Francis Sandford's The History of the Coronation of James II

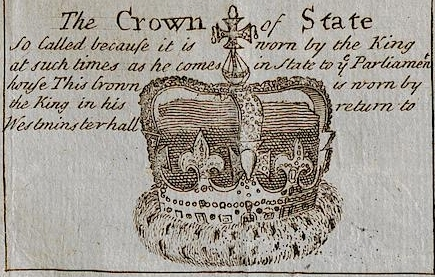
The crown at the coronation of James II

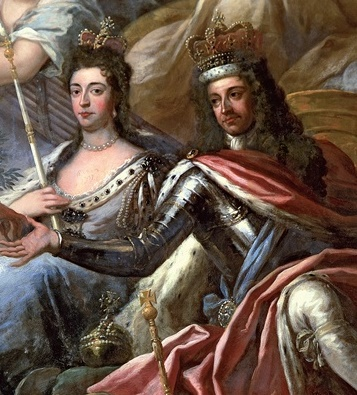
William III in the state crown

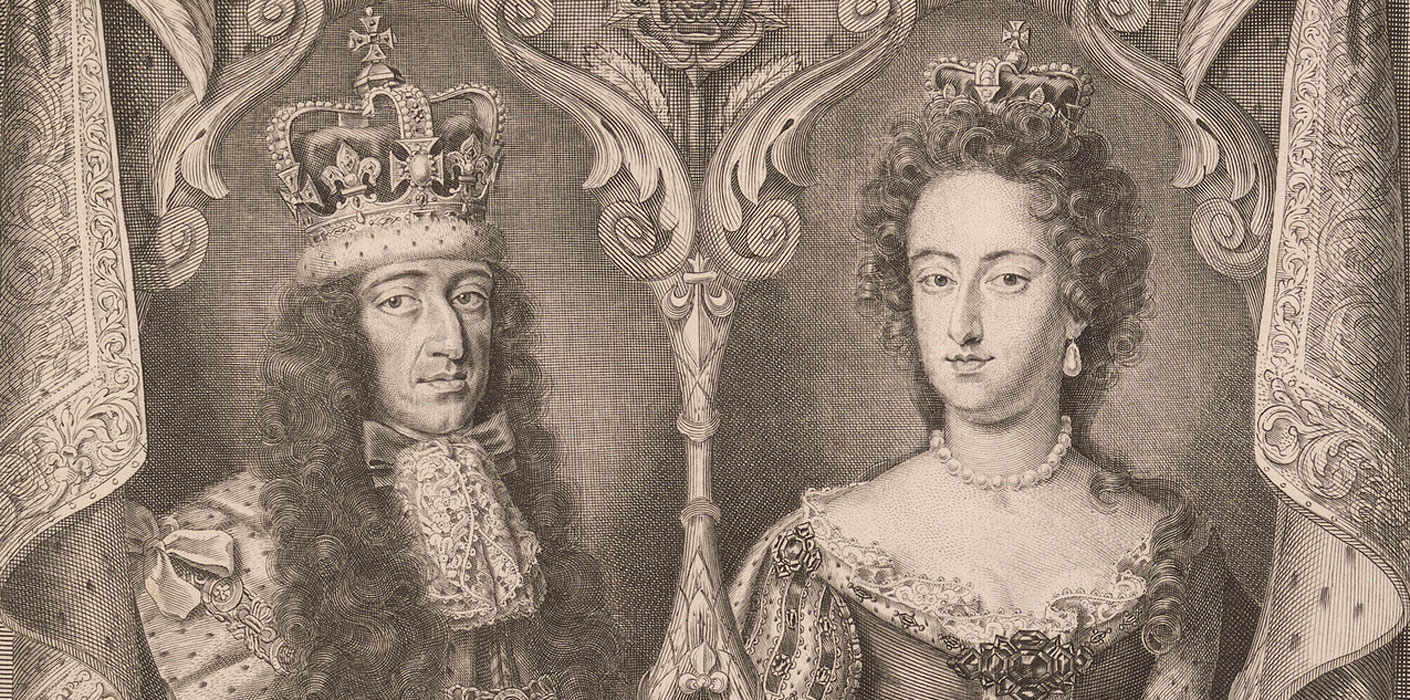
Depiction of William III in the state crown, with Mary in the consort's crown

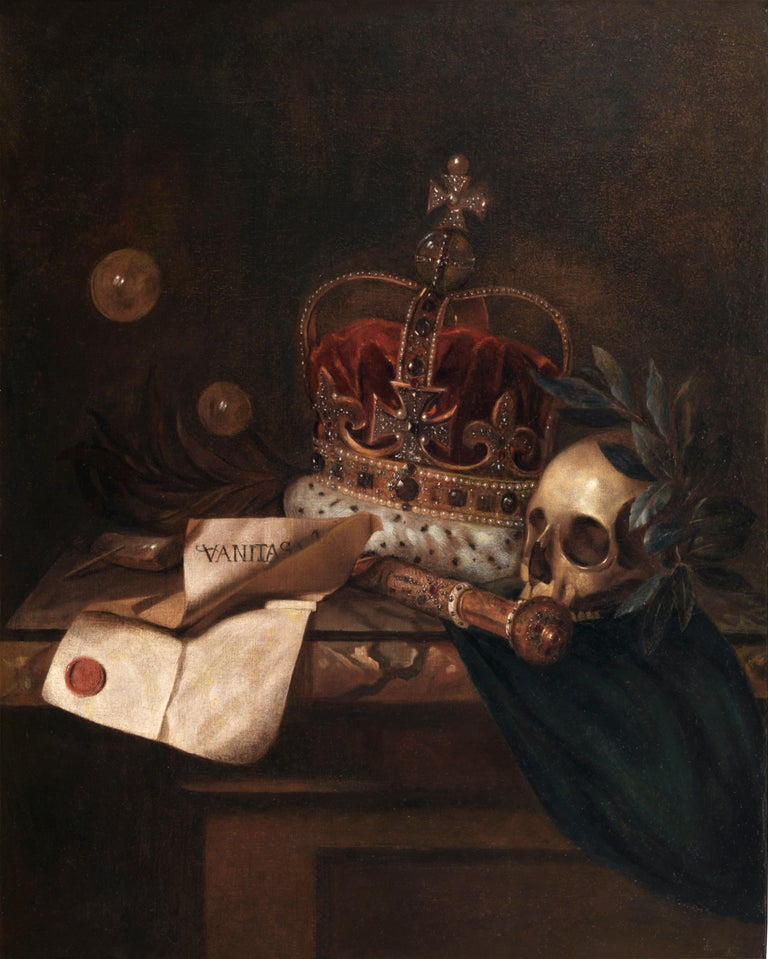
A vanitas by Evert Collier, circa 1690

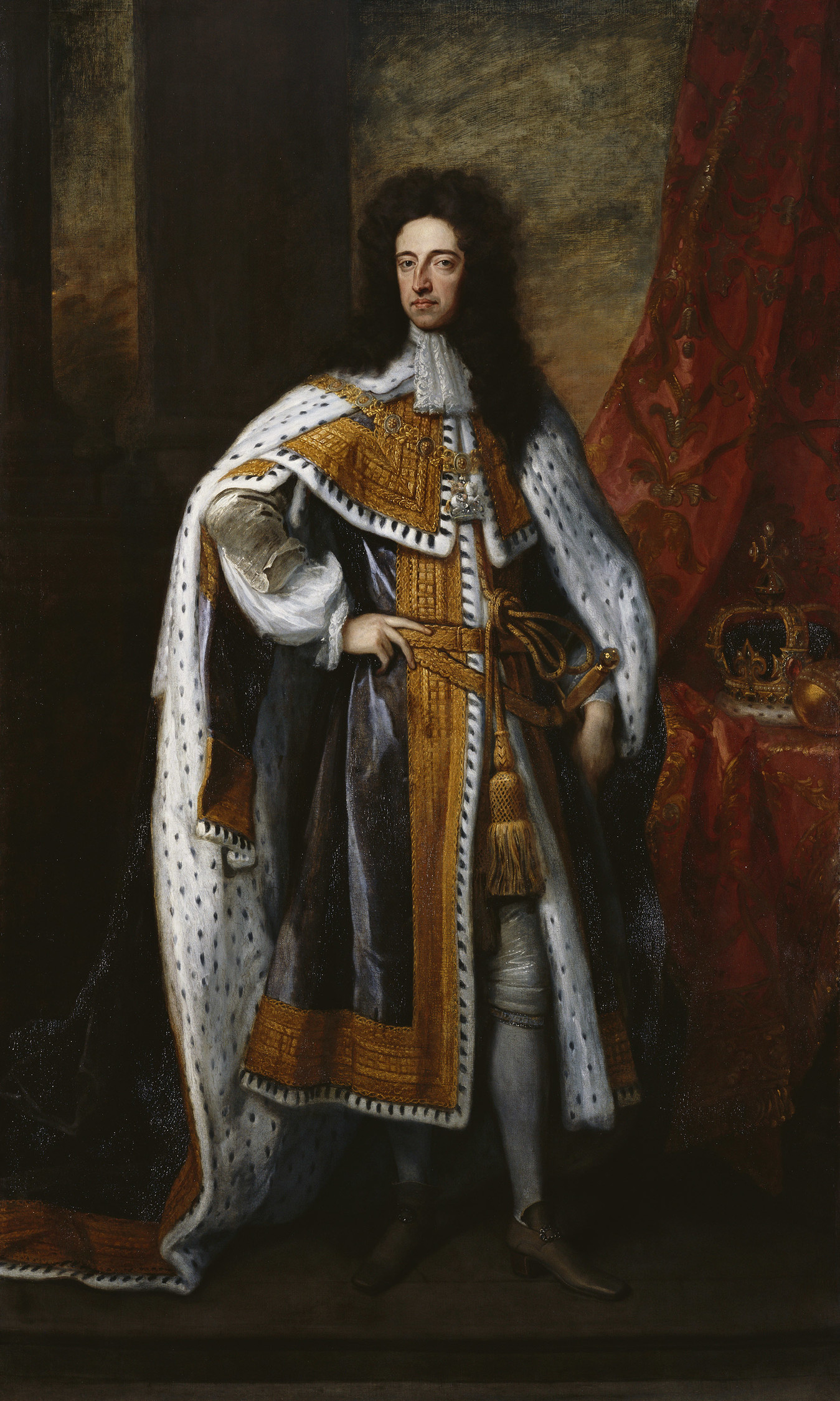
William III with the state crown, circa 1690

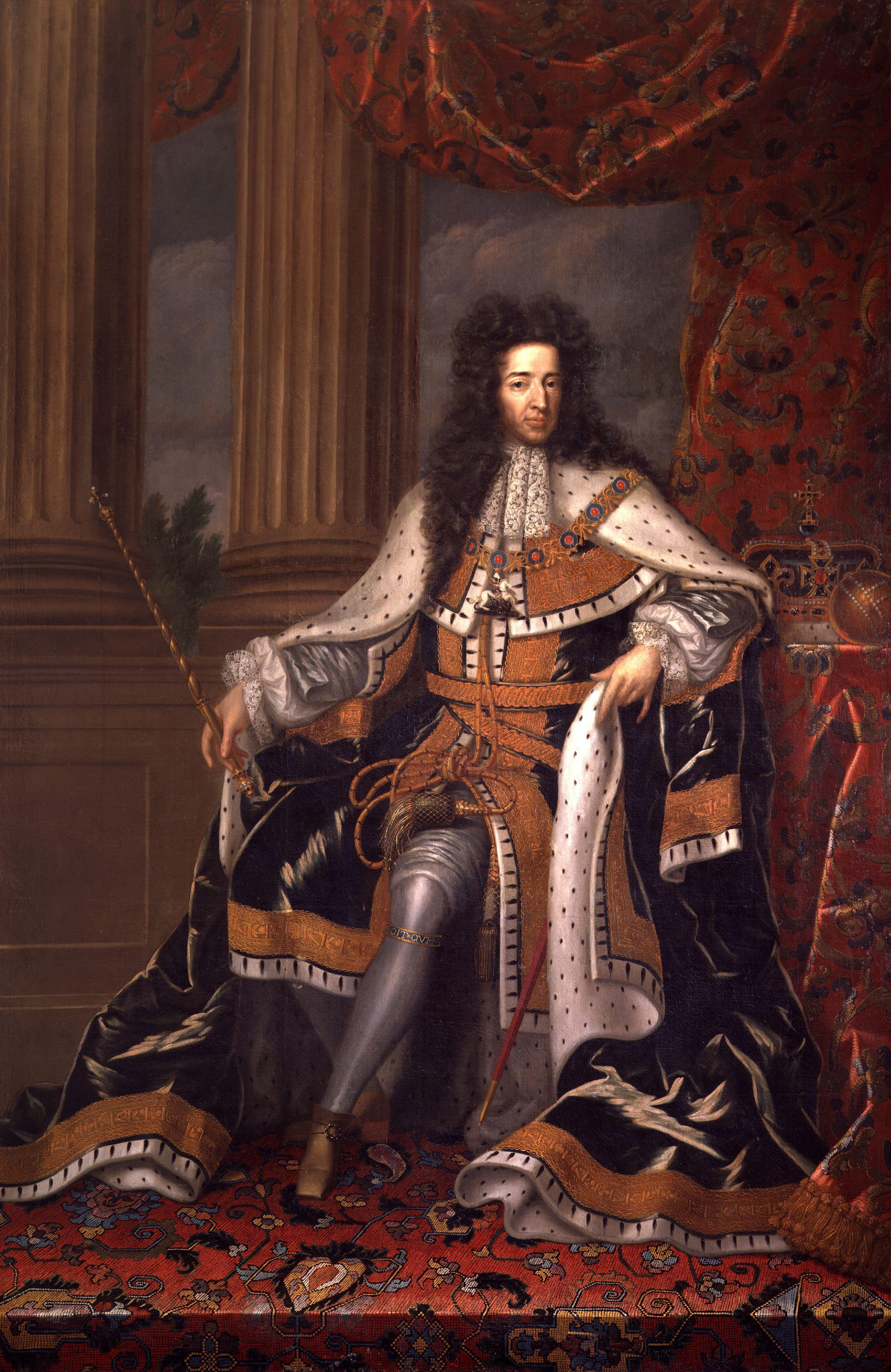
William III, circa 1690

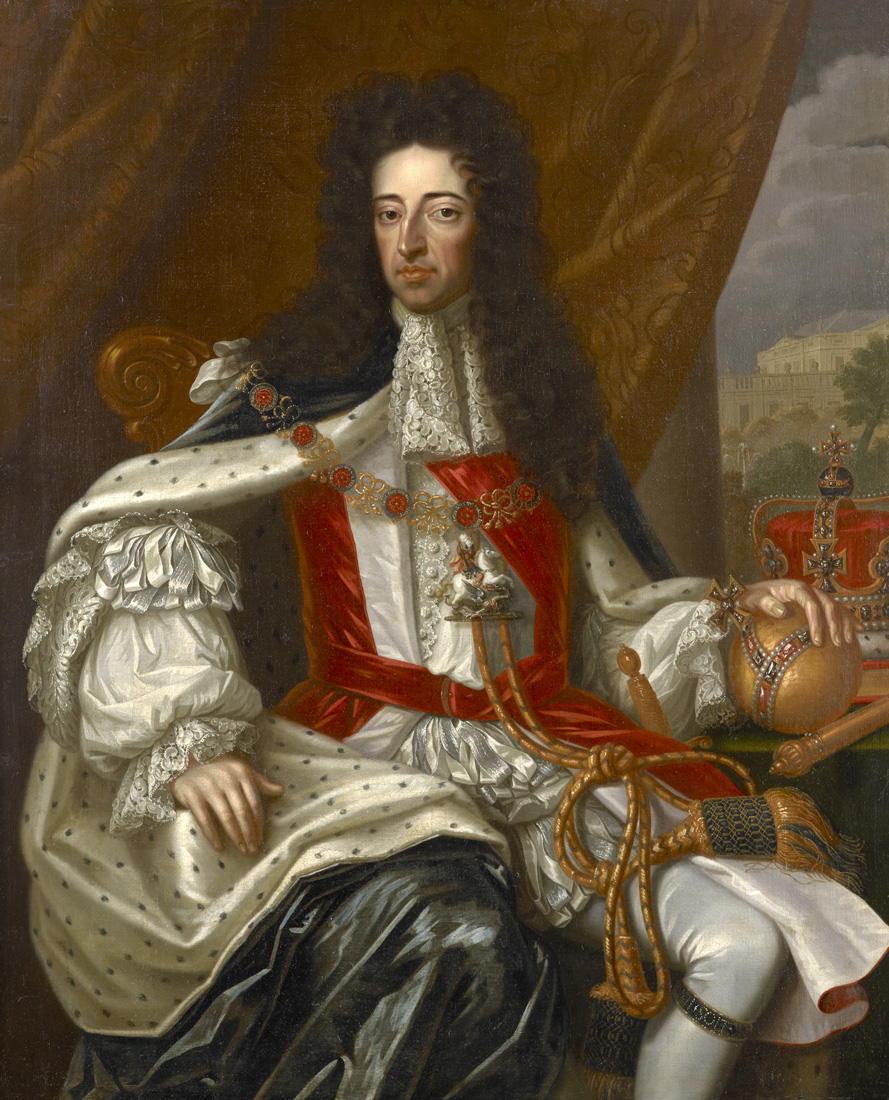
William III, circa 1690s

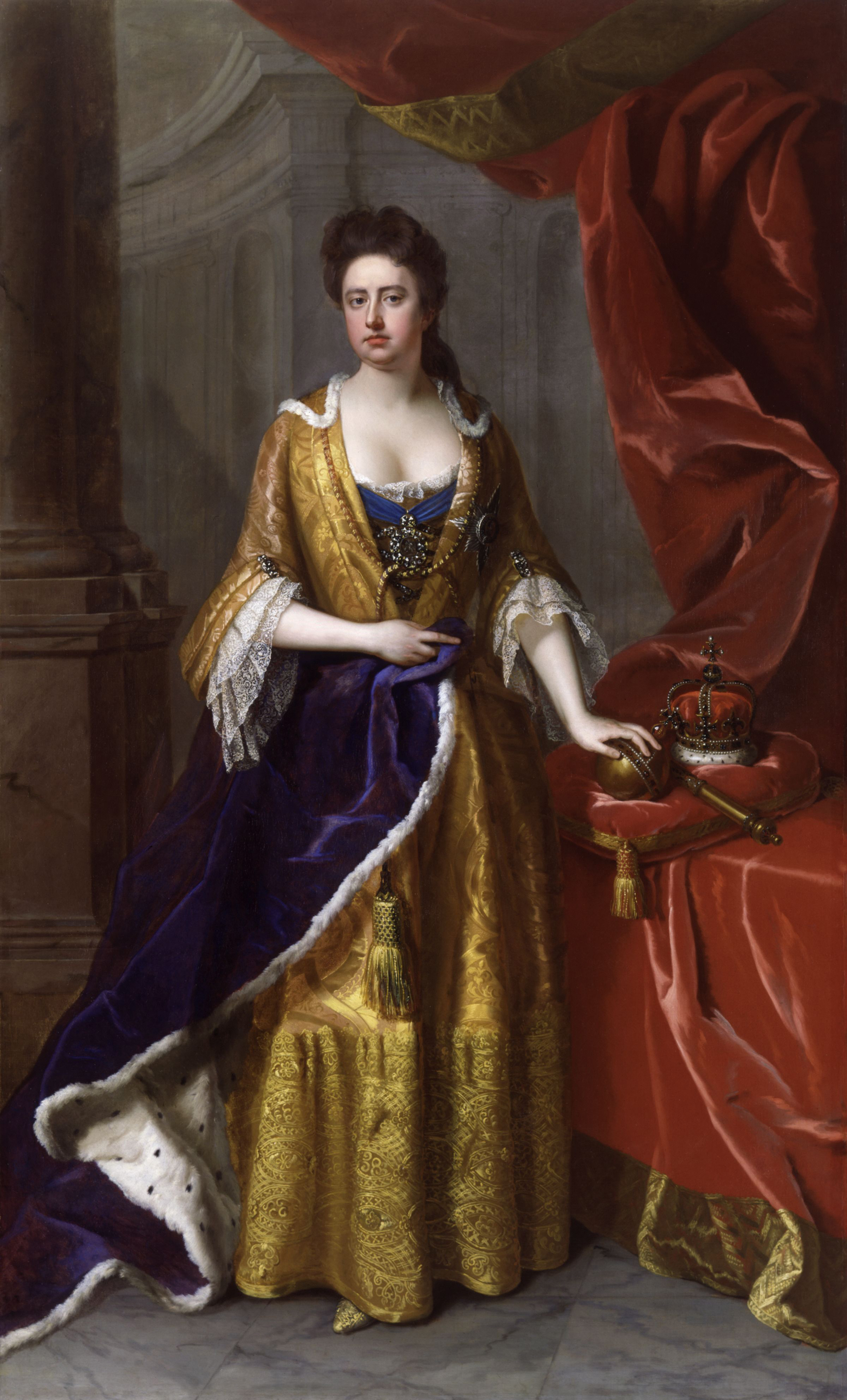
Queen Anne with the Crown of Charles II, adjusted to reduce its weight

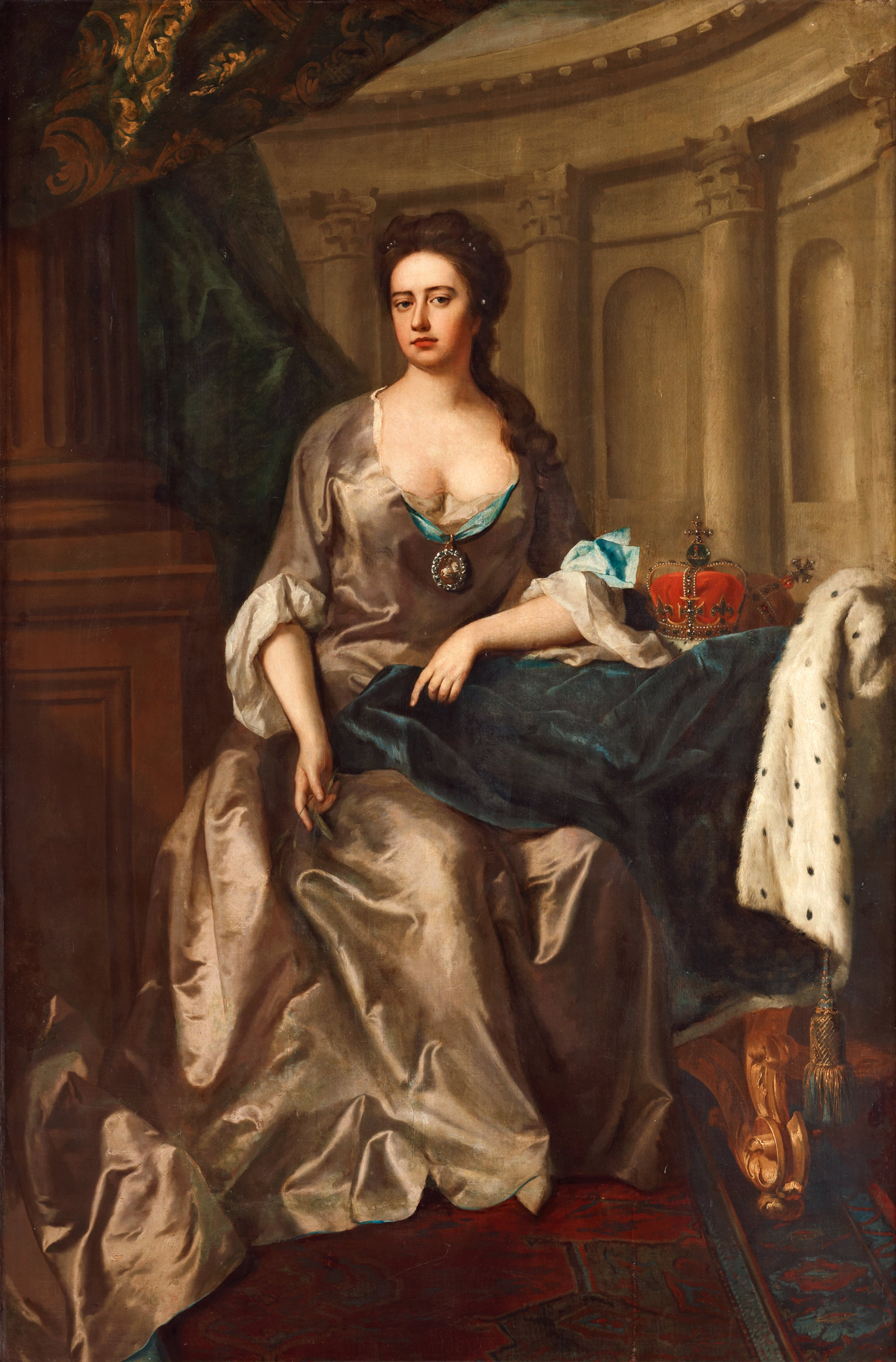
Queen Anne by Michael Dahl

== See also ==
- St Edward's Crown
- Crown Jewels of the United Kingdom
