= St Edward's Crown =

Part of the Crown Jewels of the United Kingdom

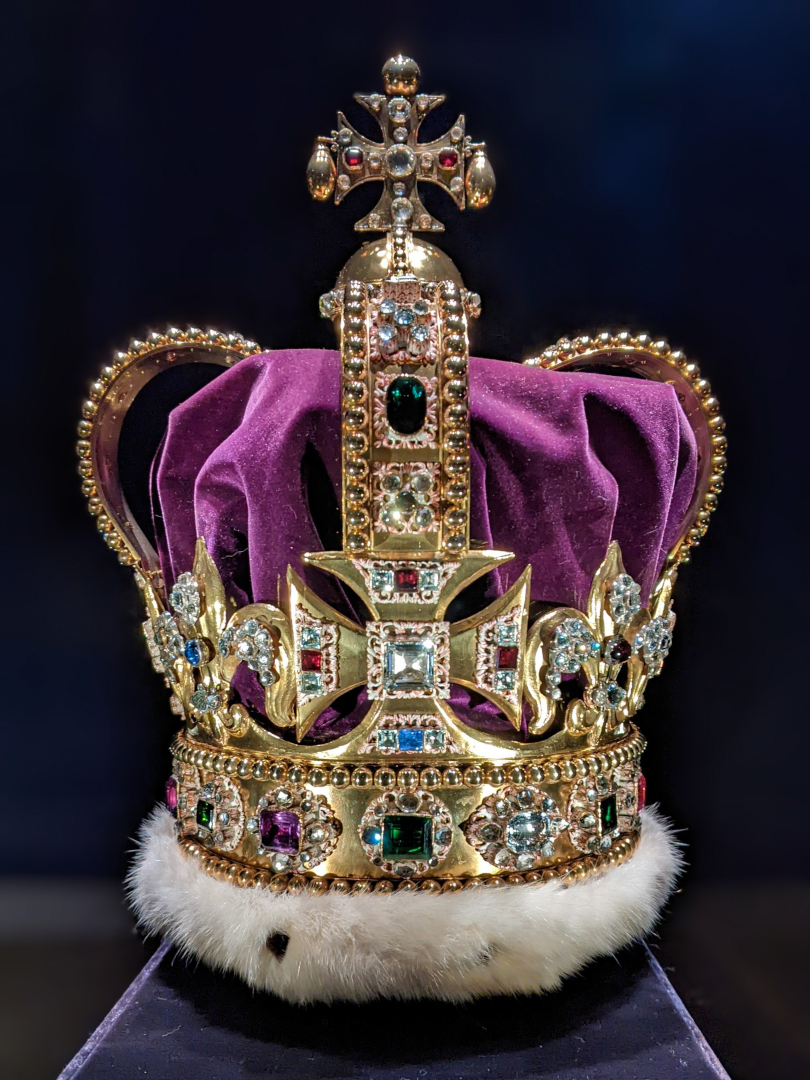
- St Edward's Crown in 2022

Heraldic depictions

Details
- Country: United Kingdom
- Made: 1661
- Owner: Charles III in right of the Crown
- Weight: 2.23 kg (4.9 lb)
- Arches: 2
- Material: 22-carat gold

St Edward's Crown is the coronation crown of the Crown Jewels of the United Kingdom. Named after Edward the Confessor, versions of it have traditionally been used to crown English and British monarchs at their coronations since the 13th century. It is normally on public display in the Jewel House at the Tower of London, and is widely regarded as one of the most important pieces of regalia in the British monarchy.

The original crown was a holy relic kept at Westminster Abbey, Edward's burial place, until the regalia were either sold or melted down when Parliament abolished the monarchy in 1649, during the English Civil War. The current St Edward's Crown was made for Charles II in 1661. It is 22-carat gold, 30 centimetres (12 in) tall, weighs 2.23 kilograms (4.9 lb), and is decorated with 444 precious and fine gemstones. The crown is similar in weight and overall appearance to the original, but its arches are Baroque.

Owing to its weight, after 1689 the crown was not used to crown any monarch for over 200 years, instead it was displayed on the altar at the coronation, while a lighter coronation crown or state crown was used. Use in the coronation was revived by George V in 1911 and has continued since. It was most recently used at the 2023 coronation of Charles III.

== History ==
=== Origin of the crown ===
Some older sources date the crown to the reign of Alfred the Great. In 853 Æthelwulf, King of Wessex, sent Alfred, his youngest son, to Rome when he was five years old. According to the Anglo-Saxon Chronicle, Alfred was blessed by Pope Leo IV. Later accounts in the 13th-century Flores Historiarum suggest that he returned to England with regalia presented to him during the ceremony. In around 1270 the historian Robert of Gloucester connected the King of England's crown with Alfred's visit to Rome, writing, "The pope Leo him blessed when he thither came and the king's crown of this land, that in this land yet is". A biography of Alfred written by the Welsh monk Asser in c. 893 and printed in 1574 and 1603 perpetuated the claims that Alfred had been crowned and anointed by the pope. The 17th-century historian John Spelman wrote that an inscription on the box of St Edward's Crown, translated from Latin, read, "This is the chief crown of the two, with which were crowned Kings Alfred, Edward and others".

Consequently, it was widely believed that Alfred had been anointed and crowned by the pope in anticipation of his eventual succession to the throne of Wessex and that St Edward's Crown was, in fact, the crown worn by Alfred, which descended to Edward and all succeeding monarchs. However, Alfred was only fourth in line to the throne in 853, and a letter from Pope Leo to Æthelwulf, discovered in the 19th century, revealed that Alfred was actually confirmed by the pope and invested with the insignia of a Roman consul. There is no reference to "King Alfred's Crown" in any coronation order of service or account.

According to the 12th-century historian William of Malmesbury, Edward wore his crown on Easter Day 1065 and again on Christmas Day of that year (William the Conqueror later extended this custom to Whitsunday as well as Easter and Christmas). It is thought Edward was the first English king to wear a crown with arches, known as an imperial or "closed crown", symbolising subservience to no one but God, in the tradition of Byzantine emperors. Few descriptions survive and there are no certain visual records of it. The 17th-century historian John Spelman described the crown as of "ancient Work with Flowers, adorn'd with Stones of somewhat a plain setting", and an inventory described it as "gold wire-work set with slight stones and two little bells", weighing 2.25 kilograms (79.5 oz).

=== Canonisation of Edward to the early 17th century ===
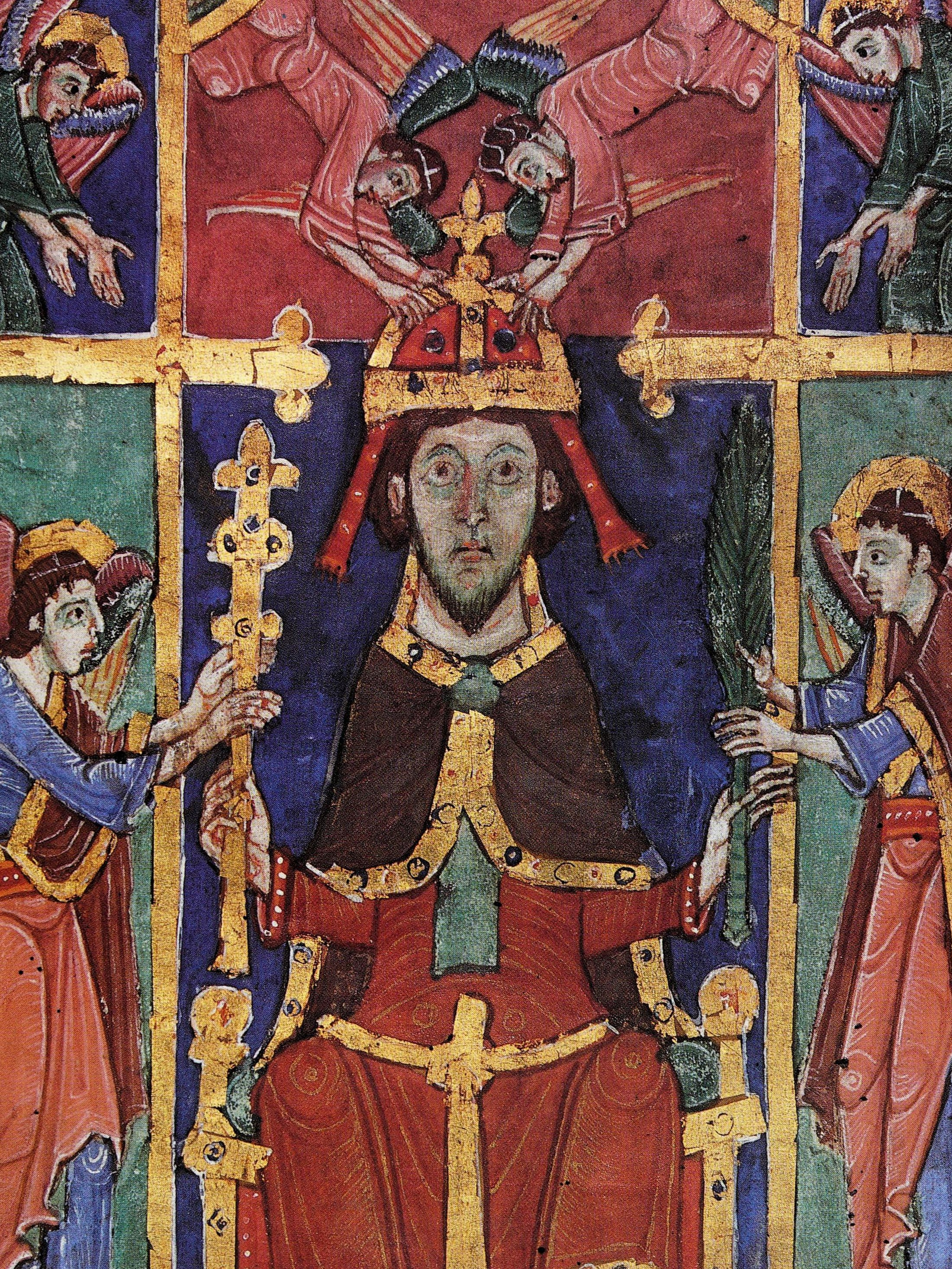
An early 12th-century portrait of Edmund the Martyr, wearing a crown similar in appearance to St Edward's, which was not surmounted by a cross.

In 1161, Edward the Confessor was made a saint, and possessions from his reign became holy relics. The monks at his burial place, Westminster Abbey, claimed that Edward had asked them to use his regalia for the coronations of all future kings. A note to this effect is contained in an inventory drawn up by a monk at the abbey in 1450. Although the Abbey's claim is likely to have been untrue, and some of the regalia were probably taken from Edward's grave when his remains were reinterred, (Note: Edward's grave was opened three times: in 1102, 1163 and 1269. In addition, the coffin was found to be broken in 1685 and some items were removed. Edward was found wearing a coronet of gold about one inch broad but this was left undisturbed and remains in the tomb.) it became accepted as fact, thereby establishing the first known set of hereditary coronation regalia in Europe. An object referred to as "St Edward's Crown" is first recorded as having been used at a coronation for Henry III in 1216. Wearing a crown owned by a previous monarch who was now also a saint reinforced the king's legitimacy.

On Henry III's expedition to Brittany in 1230, the nobles and the abbot of Westminster refused to allow St Edward's Crown to leave the kingdom with Henry, a tradition which has continued. When Henry III created a new treasury at the Tower of London to hold his state regalia, the holy relics of St Edward remained at Westminster Abbey. When Richard II was forced to abdicate in 1399, he had the crown brought to the Tower of London, where he symbolically handed it over to his successor Henry IV, saying "I present and give to you this crown with which I was crowned King of England and all the rights dependent on it". Sometime between 1359 and the mid 1450s a crown for the coronation of a queen was added to the regalia and was named Queen Edith's Crown after Edward's spouse, Edith of Wessex. However, the second wife of Henry VIII, Anne Boleyn, was crowned with St Edward's Crown in 1533, which was unprecedented for a queen consort.

Henry VII or his son and successor Henry VIII commissioned an elaborate crown, now known as the Tudor Crown, which is first described in detail in an inventory of royal jewels in 1521. After the English Reformation, the Church of England denounced the veneration of medieval relics and, starting with the coronation of Edward VI in 1547, the significance of Edward the Confessor's crown was downplayed. Both Edward VI and Mary I were crowned with three crowns in succession: first St Edward's Crown, second the Tudor Crown (termed the 'Imperiall crowne' in contemporary accounts) and finally in 'very rich' crowns made specifically for each of their coronations. Three crowns were also present at the coronation of Elizabeth I, and she was probably crowned in the same fashion as her predecessors. James I reverted to the tradition of being crowned with St Edward's Crown only before donning his own crown to depart Westminster Abbey.

=== Destruction ===
During the English Civil War and following Charles I's flight from London in 1642, rumours circulated in London (which held some truth) that the king was attempting to sell the crown jewels in Holland in order to fund a war against parliament. Parliament declared that anyone trafficking the crown jewels—which were the property of the Crown and not the king personally—was an enemy of the state. In 1643, suspicions arose in parliament that the coronation regalia had been taken from Westminster Abbey to York by the royalist Dean of Westminster, John Williams. When the sub-dean refused to allow access for the regalia to be checked, a motion was brought before parliament to force the opening of the abbey treasury. The first motion failed, but a second motion passed which ordered the locks to be opened, an inventory made, and the locks changed. The inventory was taken by Henry Marten and George Wither, who were reported by Peter Heylyn to have mocked the regalia, with Marten having dressed Wither in St Edward's Crown and robes, who then, 'marched about the room with stately garb and afterwards with a Thousand Apish and Ridiculous Actions exposed these sacred ornaments to contempt and laughter'.

Following the execution of Charles I in 1649, the regalia were removed from the abbey and taken to join the rest of the Crown Jewels and plate at the Tower of London. Parliament ordered that the regalia, then under the supervision of Sir Henry Mildmay, Master of the Jewel Office, 'be totally broken, and that they melt down all the gold and silver and sell all the jewels to the best advantage of the Commonwealth.' Henry Mildmay stayed away, but his nephew and Clerk of the Jewel House, Carew Mildmay, returned the instructions 'not obeyed', for which he was jailed at Fleet Prison. Nonetheless, an inventory and valuation was taken, and the reglia was broken up and sold or turned into coinage. St Edward's Crown was described in the inventory as, 'King Alfred's Crown of gold wire-work set with slight stones and two little bells', weighing 79.5 ounces (2.25 kg), valued at £3 per ounce, total value £248 10s 0d.

=== Restoration ===
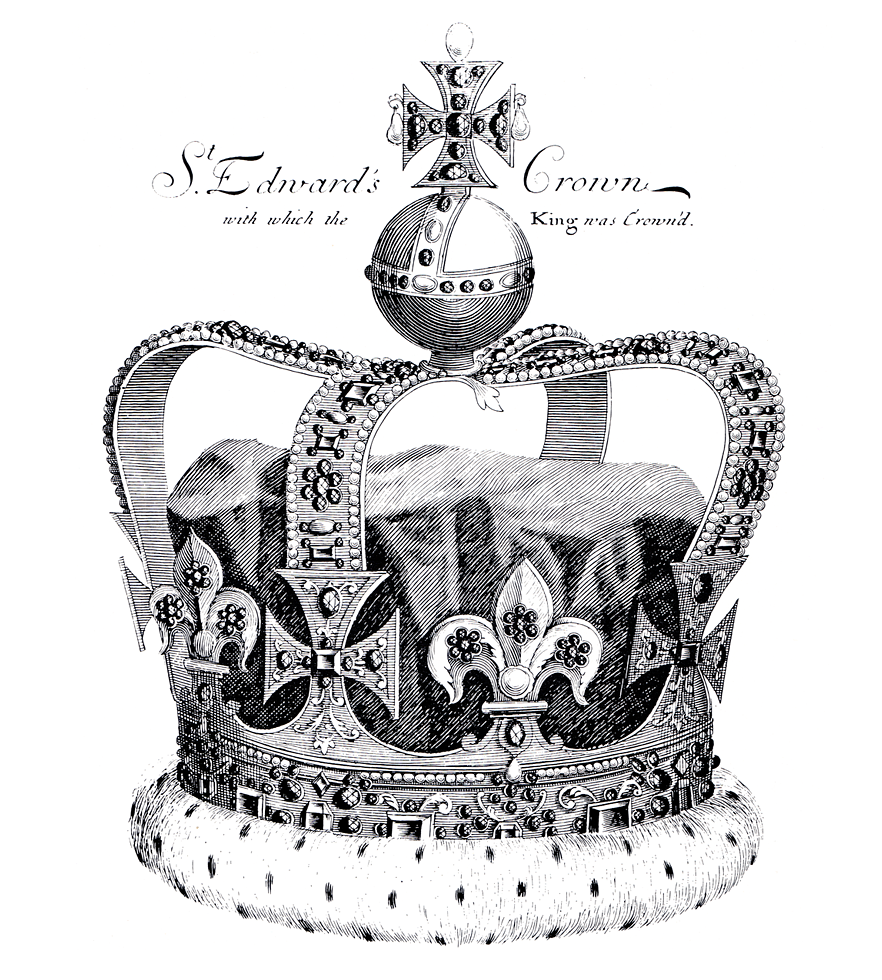
St Edward's Crown as it looked at the English coronation of James II in 1685, by the engraver William Sherwin

The monarchy was restored in 1660, and in preparation for the coronation of Charles II, who had been living in exile abroad, a new St Edward's Crown and a new state crown were ordered from the Royal Goldsmith, Sir Robert Vyner. The new St Edward's Crown was fashioned to closely resemble the medieval crown, with a heavy gold base and clusters of semi-precious stones, but the arches are decidedly Baroque. In the late 20th century, it was assumed to incorporate gold from the original St Edward's Crown, as they are almost identical in weight, and an invoice was produced in 1661 for the addition of gold to an existing crown. A crown had also been displayed at the lying in state of Oliver Cromwell, Lord Protector of England from 1653 until 1658. On the weight of this evidence, writer and court historian Martin Holmes, in a 1959 paper for Archaeologia, concluded that in the time of the Interregnum St Edward's Crown was saved from the melting pot and that it was enhanced at the Restoration. His theory became accepted wisdom, and many books, including official guidebooks for the Crown Jewels at the Tower of London, repeated his claim as fact. In 2008, new research found that a coronation crown was made in 1660 in anticipation of an early coronation, which had to be delayed several times. This crown was enhanced with additional gold in 1661 after Parliament increased the budget as a token of their appreciation for the king. The crown at Cromwell's lying in state was probably made of gilded base metal such as tin or copper, as was usual in 17th-century England; for example, a crown displayed at the funeral of James I had cost only £5 and was decorated with fake jewels.

A new monde and cross were created for the coronation of James II, but otherwise the crown was little altered for successive coronations beyond re-setting loaned jewels for each occasion (jewels were not set permanently in the crown until 1911). After the coronation of William III in 1689, monarchs chose to be crowned with a lighter, bespoke coronation crown (e.g., the Coronation Crown of George IV) or their state crown, while St Edward's Crown usually rested on the high altar.

=== 20th and 21st centuries ===
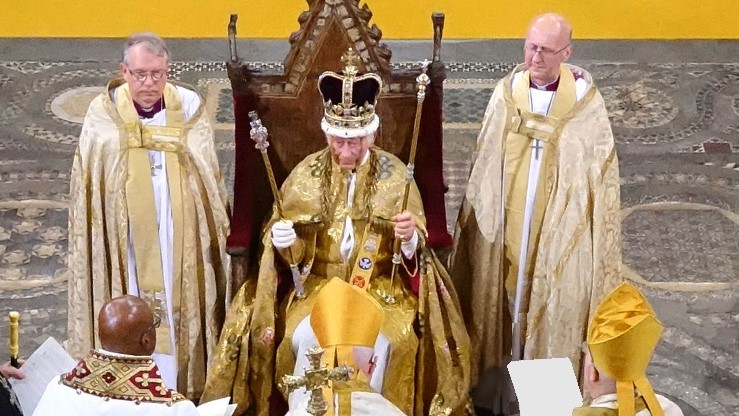
Coronation of Charles III with St Edward's Crown

Edward VII intended to revive the tradition of being crowned with St Edward's Crown in 1902, but on coronation day he was still recovering from an operation for appendicitis, and instead he wore the lighter Imperial State Crown.

Jewels were hired for use in the crown and removed after the coronation until 1911, when it was permanently set with 444 precious and semi-precious stones. Imitation pearls on the arches and base were replaced with gold beads which at the time were platinum-plated. Its band was also made smaller to fit George V, the first monarch to be crowned with St Edward's Crown in over 200 years, reducing the crown's overall weight from 82 troy ounces (2.6 kg) to 71 troy ounces (2.2 kg). It was used to crown his successor George VI in 1937, and Queen Elizabeth II in 1953.

On 4 June 2013, St Edward's Crown was displayed on the high altar in Westminster Abbey at a service marking the 60th anniversary of Elizabeth II's coronation, the first time it had left the Tower of London since 1953. In December 2022, the crown was removed from the Tower of London to be resized ahead of its use in the coronation of Charles III on 6 May 2023. Its circumference was enlarged by sawing the base into four pieces and welding 7-millimetre (0.28 in)-wide strips of gold into the gaps. Eight new gold beads were then added to the rim.

== Description ==
External videos
- 2023 video of St Edward's Crown by the Royal Collection Trust (1:36)

St Edward's Crown is 22-carat gold, measures 30 cm (12 in) tall, and weighs 2.23 kg (4.9 lb). It has four fleurs-de-lis alternating with four crosses pattée, which support two dipped arches topped by a monde and cross pattée. Its purple velvet cap is trimmed with ermine. The crown features 444 precious and fine gemstones including 345 rose-cut aquamarines, 37 white topazes, 27 tourmalines, 12 rubies, 7 amethysts, 6 sapphires, 2 jargoons, 1 garnet, 1 spinel, 1 carbuncle and 1 peridot.

== Usage ==
Although St Edward's Crown is regarded as the official coronation crown, only seven monarchs have been crowned with it since the Restoration: Charles II (1661), James II (1685), William III (1689), George V (1911), George VI (1937), Elizabeth II (1953) and Charles III (2023). Mary II and Anne were crowned with small diamond crowns of their own; George I, George II, George III, and William IV with the State Crown of George I; George IV with a large new diamond crown made specially for the occasion; and Queen Victoria and Edward VII chose not to use St Edward's Crown because of its weight and instead used the lighter 1838 Imperial State Crown. When not used to crown the monarch, St Edward's Crown rested on the high altar; however, it did not feature at all in Queen Victoria's coronation.

== Heraldry ==
Royal cypher of Elizabeth II

After the restoration of the monarchy, Charles II based the heraldic crown on the new St Edward's Crown of 1661. It had four crosses pattée alternating with four fleurs-de-lis; the number of arches was reduced to two and the curvature of the arches was depressed at the point of intersection. On this pattern the royal crown was depicted until the reign of Queen Victoria. Although Fox-Davies states that the St Edward's Crown is supposed to be heraldically represented over the Royal Arms and other insignia because "it is the 'official' crown of England", various other crowns were depicted under Victoria, whose coronation, unusually, did not feature the St Edward's Crown at all. Early depictions of the Royal Arms during her reign featured the Imperial State Crown which was created for Victoria's coronation in 1838 and was similar to the St Edward's Crown but with a flatter top. However, depictions varied depending on the artist.

In 1876, Victoria was proclaimed Empress of India, and in 1880, the heraldic crown was altered to give it a more imperial form by making the arches semi-circular. However, Victoria had favoured a Tudor style crown since at least the 1860s. (Note: Victoria had featured in William Wyon's gothic crown coin in 1847, and the Palace of Westminster, rebuilt from 1840 to 1876, makes extensive use of a gothic style crown. The British had assumed direct rule over India in 1858, and the Order of the Star of India, created in 1861, depicted a Tudor Crown from its inception. Victoria had a new crown made in 1870 which resembled the Tudor Crown, declining to wear the Imperial State Crown which she found heavy and uncomfortable.) After the accession of Edward VII, the War Office raised the issue of a standardised design of the crown for use by the British Army, there being in use several crowns of different patterns. On 4 May 1901, the king approved a single Tudor Crown design based on the crown of Henry VII, as "chosen and always used by Queen Victoria personally".

George VI had ceased to use the style "Emperor of India" in 1948 following India's independence in 1947, and on the accession of Elizabeth II in 1952, she opted to change from the 1901 Tudor Crown to a design resembling St Edward's Crown, similar to that last used before the reign of Victoria. Charles III adopted the Tudor Crown on his accession in 2022, similar to that last used under George VI but with some differences. The cap of the heraldic crowns is always represented as crimson, regardless of the colour of any actual crowns.

Under section 4 of the Trade Marks Act 1994 the royal crowns are specially protected emblems. An image of St Edward's Crown may not be used in a trade mark in the UK (or in a country which is party to the Paris Convention) without permission. Section 99 of the act also restricts business use of images of the crowns in a way which is calculated to give the impression that the user is an employee of, or a supplier to, the King or a member of the royal family. The Lord Chamberlain's Office governs the use of depictions of the royal crowns and also maintains an image library of alternative crowns that may be used commercially without causing infringement.

== Bibliography ==
- Arnold, Janet (1978). "The 'Coronation' Portrait of Queen Elizabeth I". Burlington Magazine. 120 (908): 726–739+741. JSTOR 879390.
- Barclay, Andrew (2008). "The 1661 St Edward's Crown – Refurbished, Recycled or Replaced?". The Court Historian. 13 (2): 149–170. doi:10.1179/cou.2008.13.2.002. S2CID 159809217.
- Blair, Claude, ed. (1998). The Crown Jewels: The History of the Coronation Regalia …. The Stationery Office. ISBN 978-0-11-701359-9.
- Dixon-Smith, Sally; Edwards, Sebastian; Kilby, Sarah; Murphy, Clare; Souden, David; Spooner, Jane; Worsley, Lucy (2010). The Crown Jewels: Souvenir Guidebook. Historic Royal Palaces. ISBN 978-1-873993-13-2.
- Hardman, Robert (2024). The Making of a King: King Charles III and the Modern Monarchy. Pegasus Books. ISBN 978-1-639365-31-9.
- Holmes, Martin (1959). "New Light on St. Edward's Crown". Archaeologia. 97: 213–223. doi:10.1017/S0261340900010006.
- Keay, Anna (2011). The Crown Jewels. Thames & Hudson. ISBN 978-0-500-51575-4.
- MacGregor, Arthur, ed. (1989). The Late King's Goods: Collections, Possessions and Patronage of Charles I …. Alistair McAlpine. ISBN 978-0-19-920171-6.
- Mears, Kenneth J.; Thurley, Simon; Murphy, Claire (1994). The Crown Jewels. Historic Royal Palaces. ASIN B000HHY1ZQ.
- Moncreiffe, Iain; Pottinger, Don (1953). Simple Heraldry Cheerfully Illustrated. Thomas Nelson and Sons Ltd.
- Rose, Tessa (1992). The Coronation Ceremony and the Crown Jewels. HM Stationery Office. ISBN 978-0-117-01361-2.
- Steane, John (2003). The Archaeology of the Medieval English Monarchy. Routledge. ISBN 978-1-134-64159-8.
- Twining, Edward Francis (1960). A History of the Crown Jewels of Europe. B. T. Batsford. ASIN B00283LZA6.
