= Crown of James I =

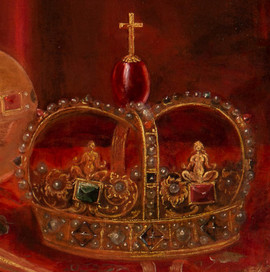
- The crown in a 1618 portrait of James I

Details
- Country: Kingdom of England
- Made: 1603
- Arches: 2
- Material: Gold
- Notable stones: Black Prince's Ruby
- Successors: State Crown of Charles II

The Crown of James I was a crown created for the 1603 coronation of James I of England. It featured in several van Somer portraits of James and in some van Dyck portraits of Charles I. It was not subsequently mentioned in the schedule of regalia broken up in 1649 during the English Civil War.

== History ==
At his coronation, James I was crowned with St Edward's Crown before donning his own crown to depart Westminster Abbey. The crown is described in detail in an inventory of 'Jewelles remayninge in an yron cheste in the secrete jewelhouse wthin the Tower of London' taken in 1604–5, and again in a 1606 list of items to be annexed to the Crown:

'Item, a Crown Imperiall of gould, set about the nether border with nyne pointed diamonds, and betwene every diamond a knot of pearl, set by five pearles in a knot; in the upper border eight rock-rubies and twenty round pearlees; the foure arches being set each of them with a table diamond, a table ruby, an emerald; and uppon two of the arches eighteen pearls, and uppon the other two arches seventeen pearles ; and betweene every arch a great ballace sett in a collett of gould, and uppon the toppe a very great ballace pierced, and a little crosse of goulde upon the toppe, enamelled blewe.'

The 'very great ballace pierced' on the top of the crown is the Black Prince's Ruby which James had inherited from Elizabeth I. James annexed his crown, the Tudor Crown and some other items to the Crown in 1606. James funded his royal progresses by the sale of some of Elizabeth I's jewels and some of the gold and silver plate in his treasury. He asked Sir Robert Cotton to investigate the precedent for selling items in the crown jewels, though he could not decide whether to part with his own crown.

The crown featured in several portraits of James by Paul van Somer and a posthumous portrait by van Dyck, as well as in two portraits of Charles I, who was more commonly depicted with the medieval Tudor Crown.

== Gallery ==
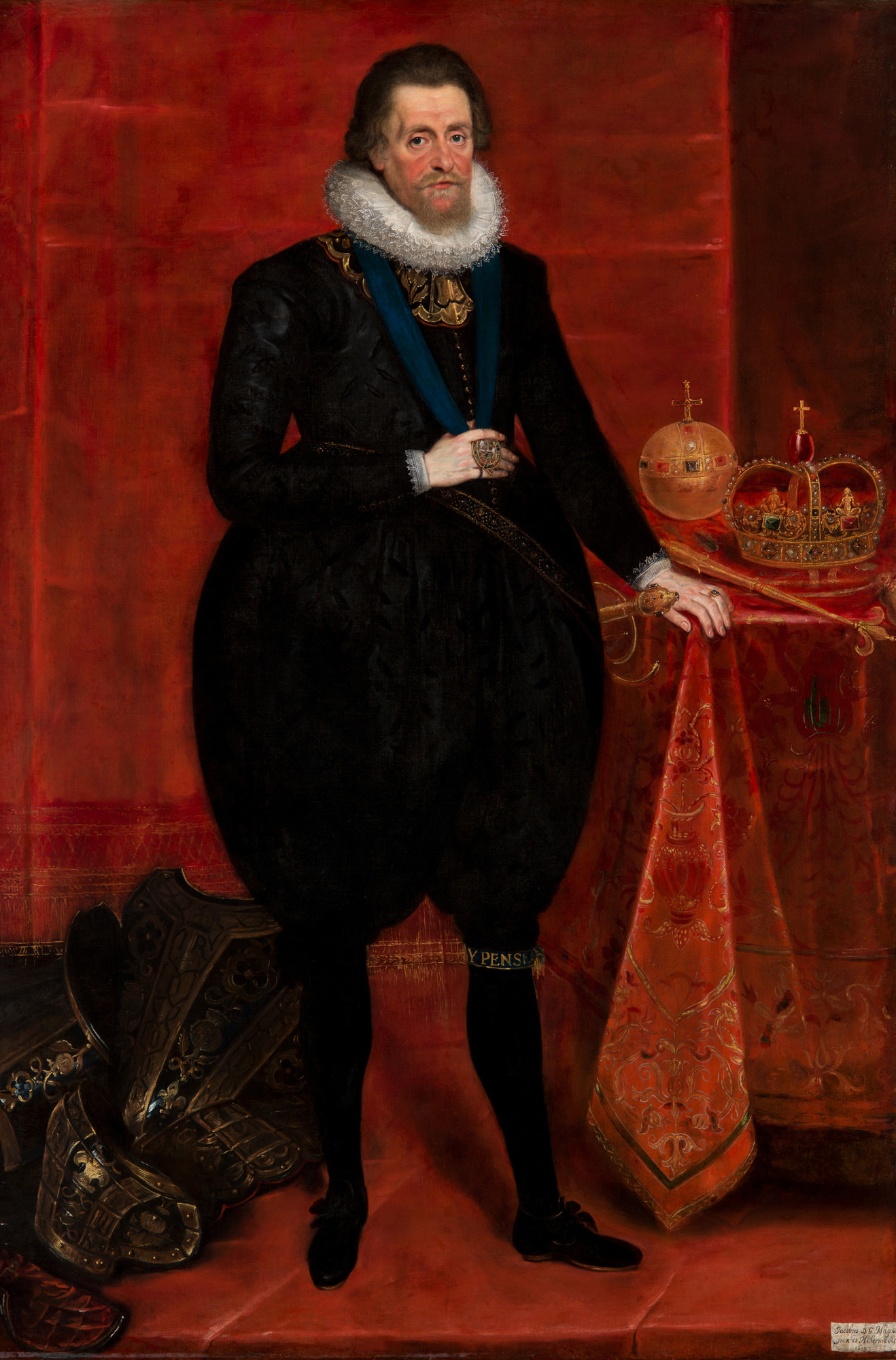
James I, van Somer, 1618

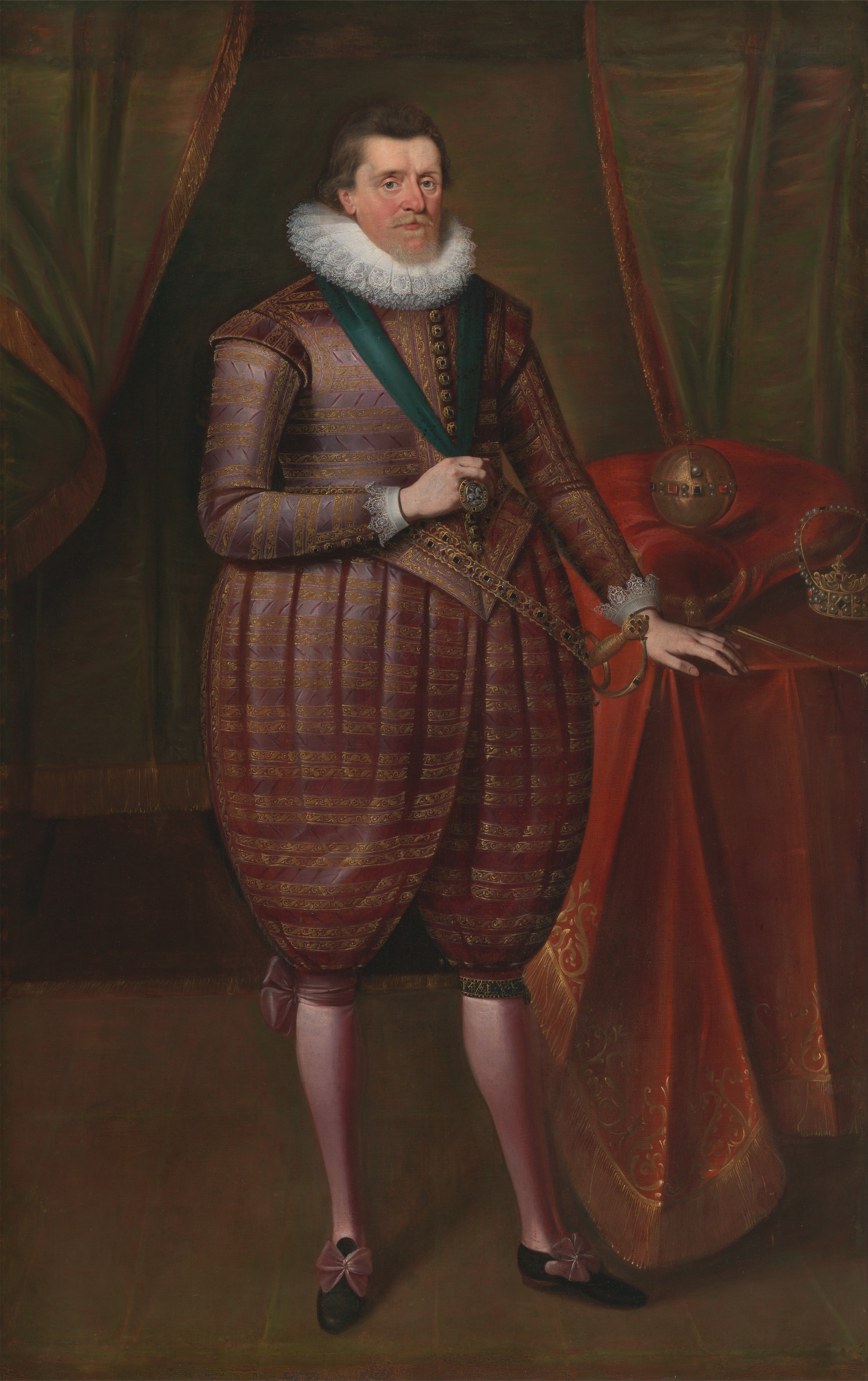
James I, van Somer, circa 1618

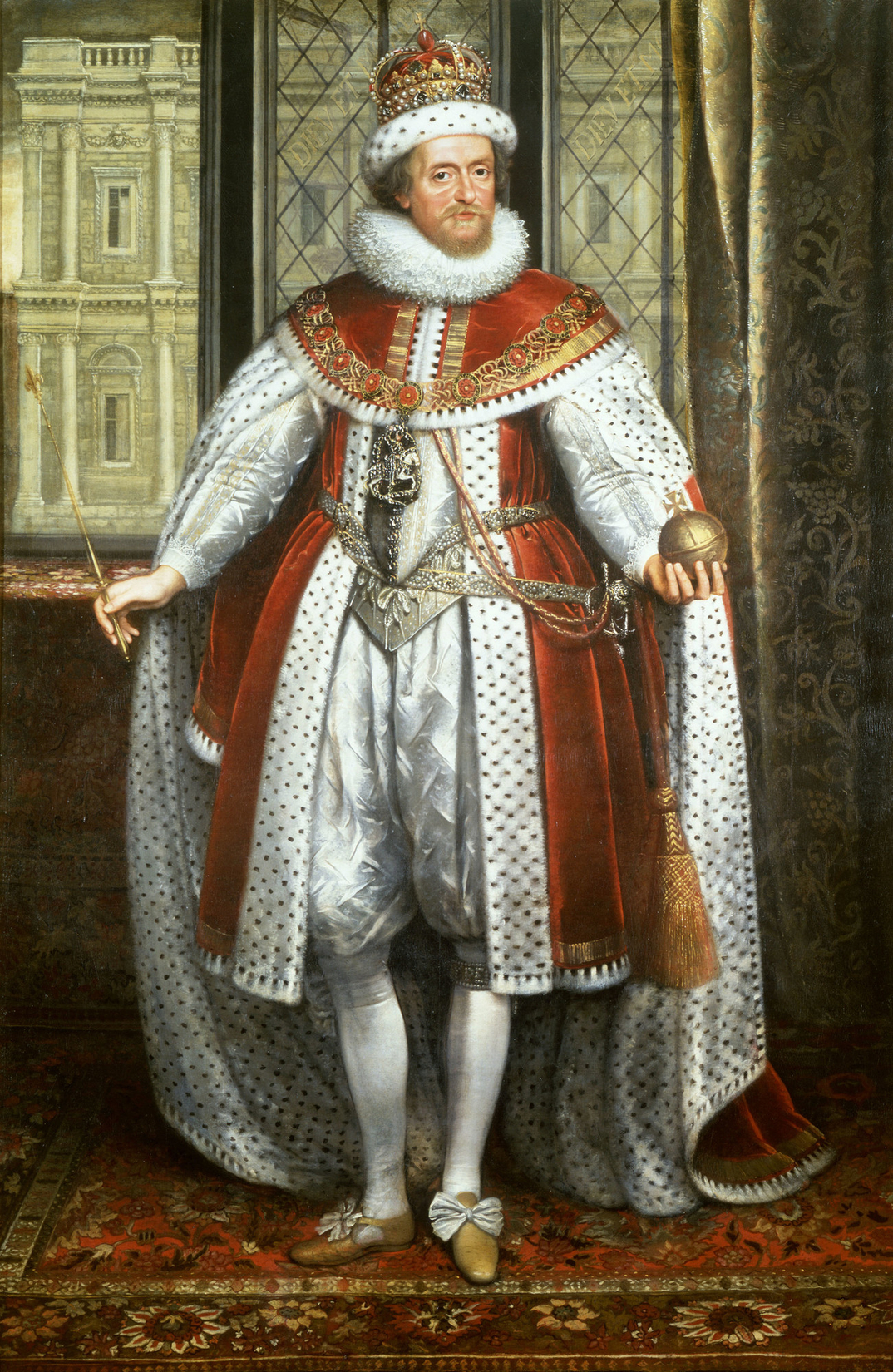
James I in coronation regalia, van Somer, circa 1620

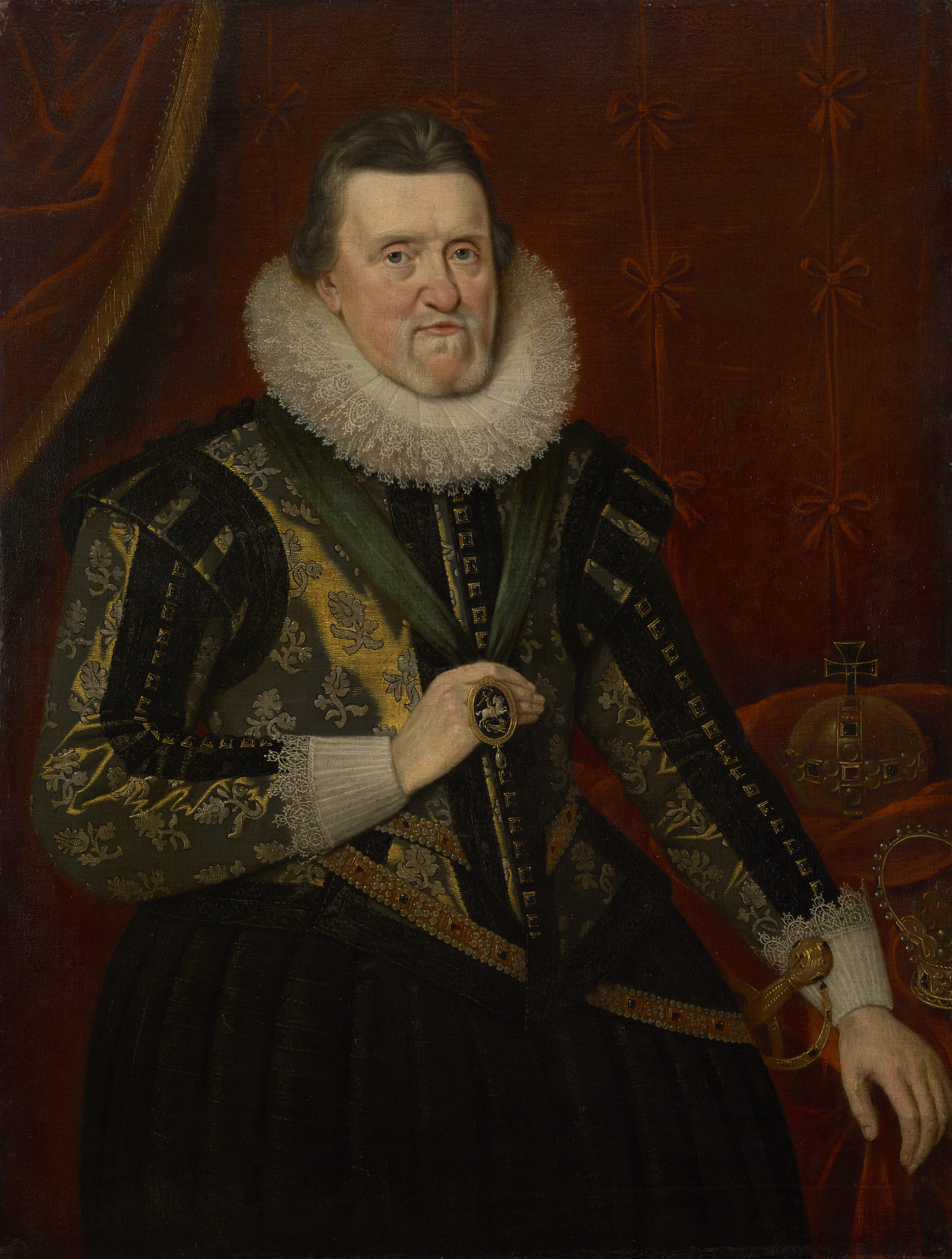
James I, Adam de Colone, after 1622

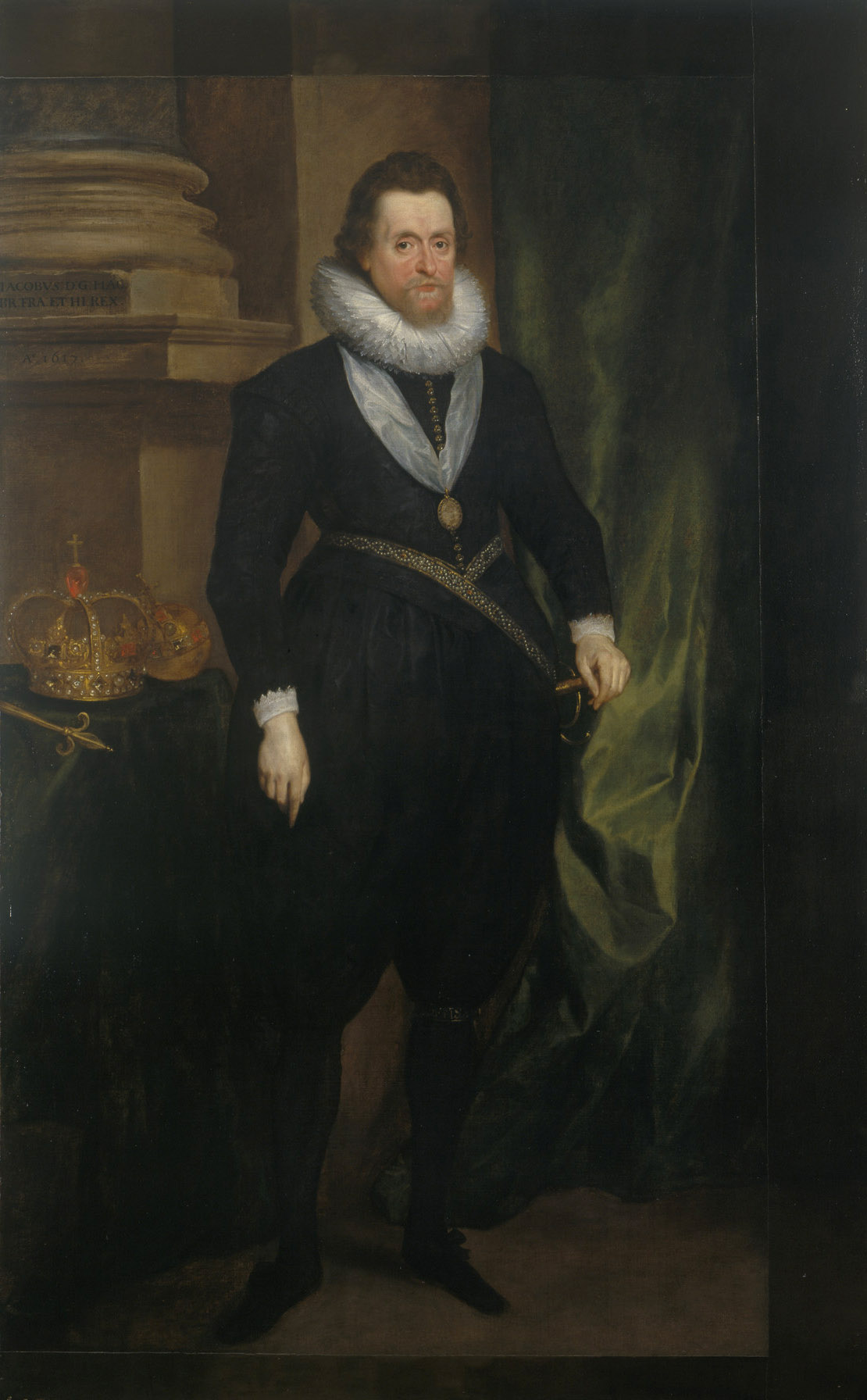
Posthumous portrait of James I, van Dyck, circa 1632

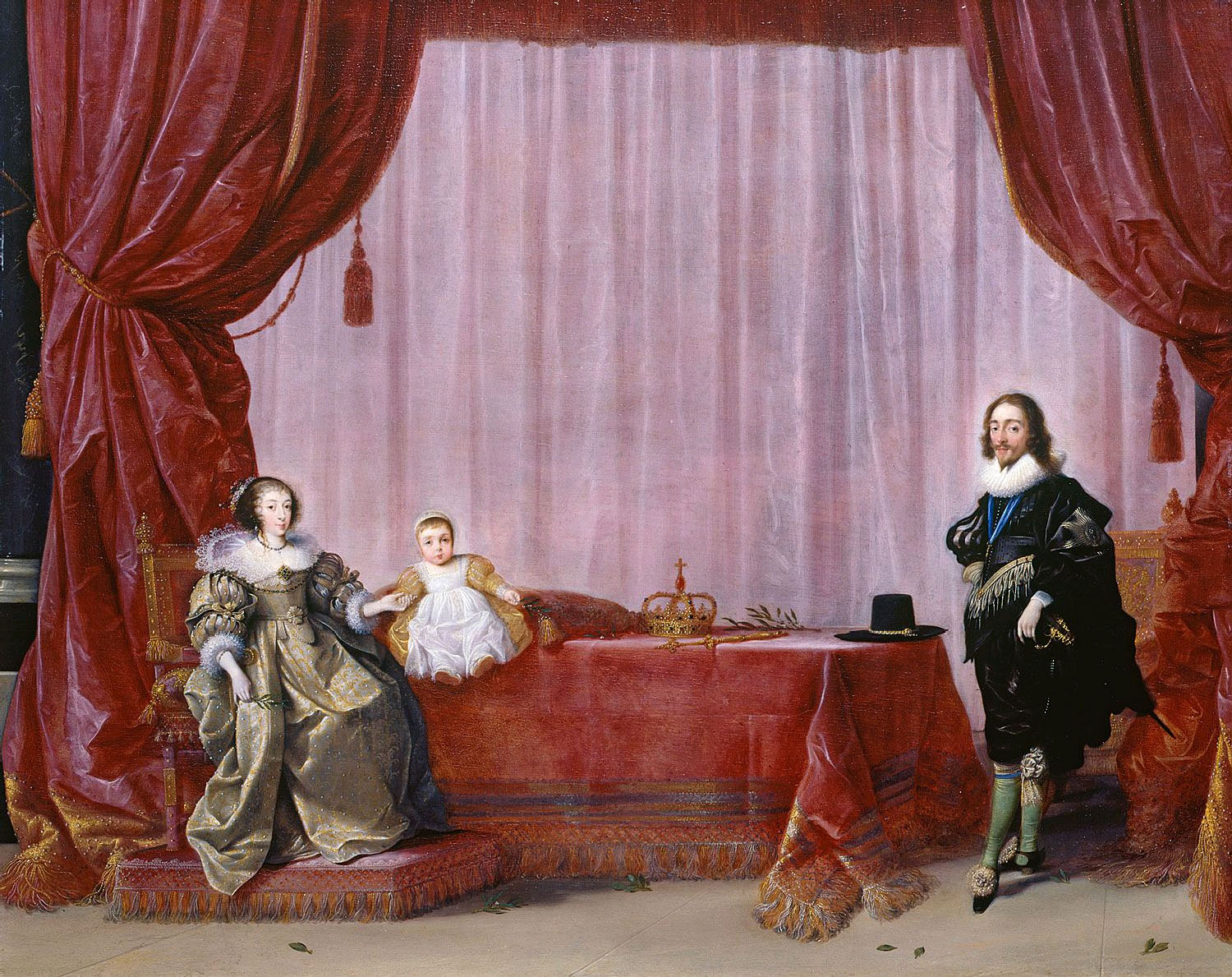
Charles I, Henrietta Maria and Charles, Prince of Wales (later Charles II), Hendrik Gerritsz Pot, circa 1632

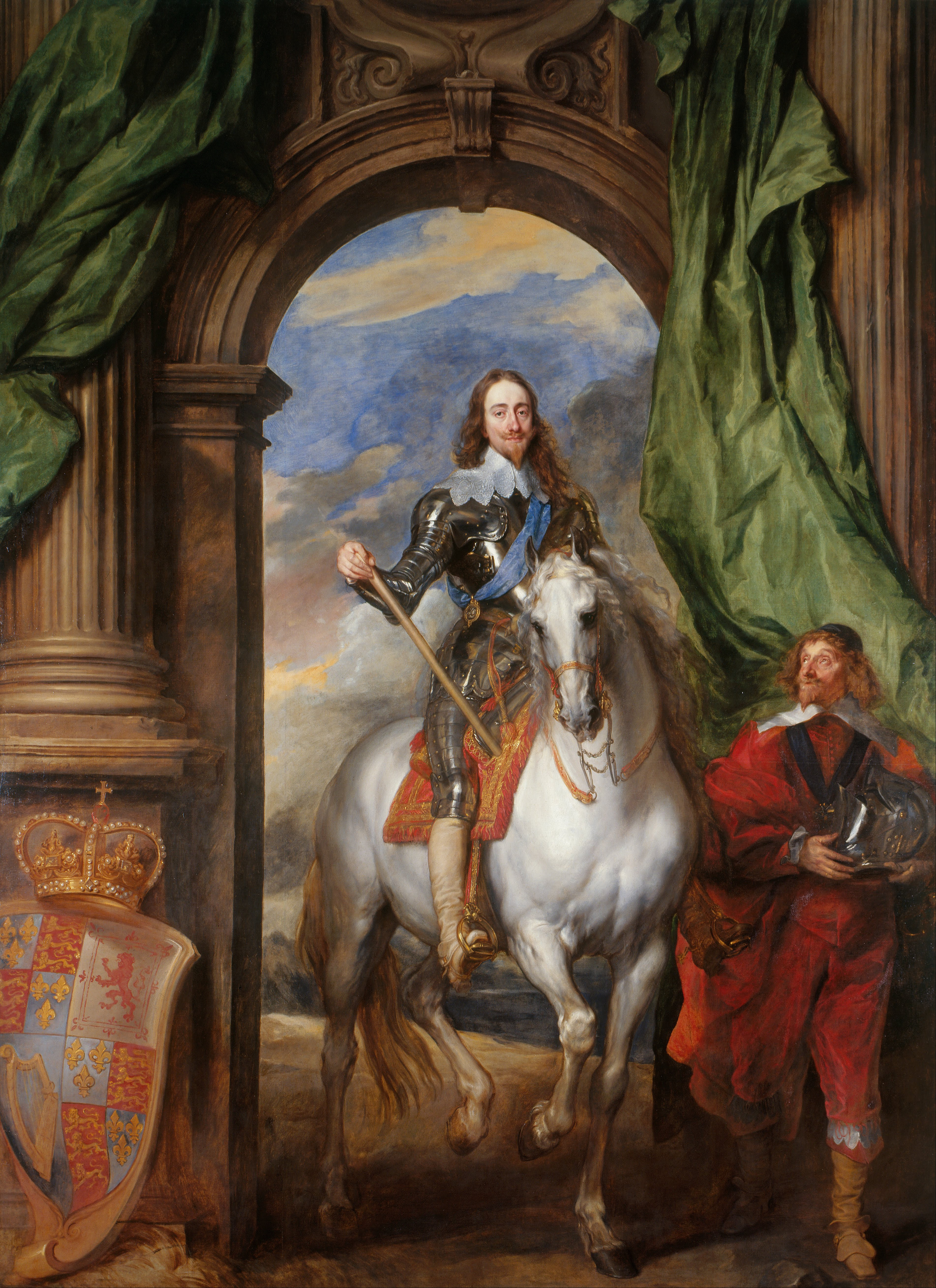
Charles I with M. de St Antoine, van Dyck, 1633

== See also ==
- Crown Jewels of the United Kingdom
