= State Crown of George I =

Crown of King George I of Great Britain and Ireland

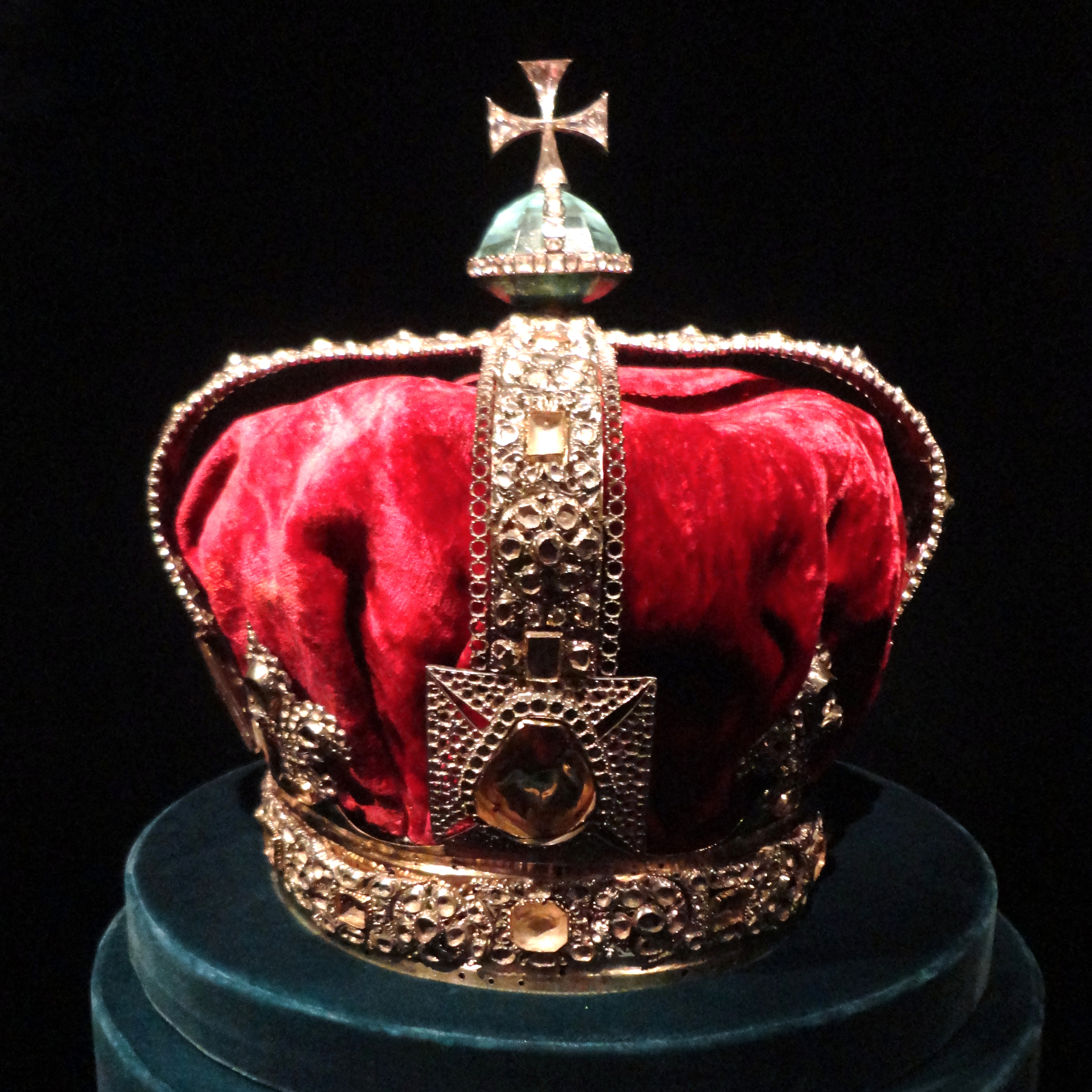
- Empty frame at the Tower of London

Details
- Country: Kingdom of Great Britain
- Made: 1714
- Arches: 2
- Predecessors: State Crown of Charles II
- Successors: Imperial State Crown of Queen Victoria

The State Crown of George I is the imperial and state crown crafted in 1714 for George I of Great Britain. It was modified and used by subsequent monarchs until 1838. The empty gold frame and its aquamarine monde which dates from the reign of James II are both part of the Crown Jewels of the United Kingdom. They are on public display in the Jewel House at the Tower of London.

== Origin ==
The crown, made by royal jeweller Samuel Smithin, replaced the State Crown of Charles II (also used by his successors, James II, William III and Queen Anne) and incorporated some of the jewels and pearls from the old crown, with the addition of 265 new pearls, 160 diamonds, 6 emeralds and 2 sapphires, at a total cost of £1,440. Very little change was made to either the shape of the crown or the arrangement of the stones. The gold frame is 20.4 cm (8.0 in) tall, and the monde and cross surmounting it are 8.5 cm (3.3 in) tall.

== Watercolour ==
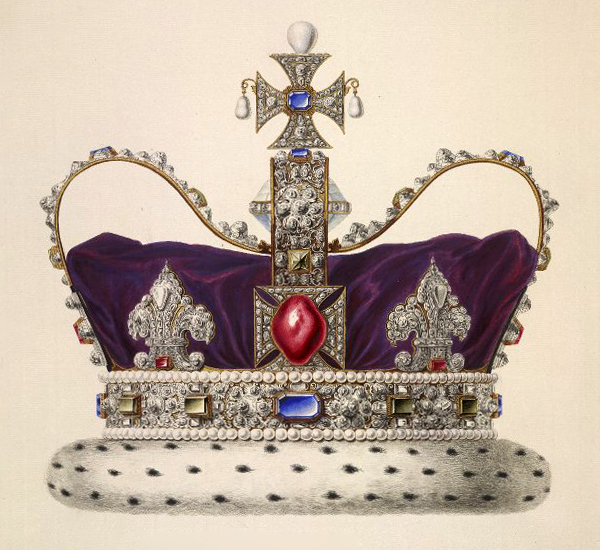
Watercolour of the crown in its original form by Bernard Lens III, 1731

The crown is vibrantly depicted in a watercolour painting by Bernard Lens III, the miniature painter to the court of George II, dated 1731. This date suggests that Lens had made a sketch of the crown before it was entirely reset in 1727 for George II but did not finish it until some time afterwards. The inscription reads:

The crown with which George I, King of Great Britain, was crowned on 20 October 1714. The cap is of crimson velvet or purple; welt of ermine; circle and arches of beaten gold. The ornaments are silver and set with diamonds; the larger stones are sapphires and emeralds, and a few small rubies. The balas in the cross in front was given to the crown by James II. The ball on which the upper cross is fixed is an aquamarine but the lower part is gold enamelled green. It is worn when the king goes to parliament, is made new for every coronation, and kept at the Tower of London.

The "balas" mentioned here is the Black Prince's Ruby, a large spinel that was actually in the state crown of Charles II, and is first mentioned in Tudor inventories as being set in a crown used by Henry VIII. The "aquamarine" dates from 1685, when it replaced the original monde in the state crown of Charles II, and was later found to be paste or coloured glass.

== Subsequent use and fate ==
George I's state crown was subsequently used at the coronations of George II, for whom the arches were pulled upwards, and George III. In 1821, because it was seen as being a "very poor affair", the crown underwent extensive changes, including the replacement of the rhombus-shaped monde with a globe of diamonds. Although the crown was present at the coronation of George IV, he was crowned using a new coronation crown made especially for him. William IV was the last monarch ever to use the crown. For her coronation in 1838, Queen Victoria had a new Imperial State Crown made, using precious stones from George I's state crown.

Emptied of its jewels and discarded by the royal family, the crown was loaned to the Museum of London by the Amherst family from 1933 until 1985. It was purchased by the jewellers Asprey in 1987. Jefri Bolkiah, Prince of Brunei, brother of the Sultan of Brunei, bought Asprey in November 1995 and presented the crown to the United Kingdom, along with the Coronation Crown of George IV, Crown of Queen Adelaide, and the Coronation Bible of George III. Earlier that year it had been valued at £576,000 for the purposes of an application to export the crown to the United States. The application was withdrawn during a review by the Reviewing Committee on the Export of Works of Art. It is now part of the Royal Collection. It was on public display in the Martin Tower at the Tower of London from 1996 until 2023, and is now on display in the tower's Jewel House.

== Gallery ==
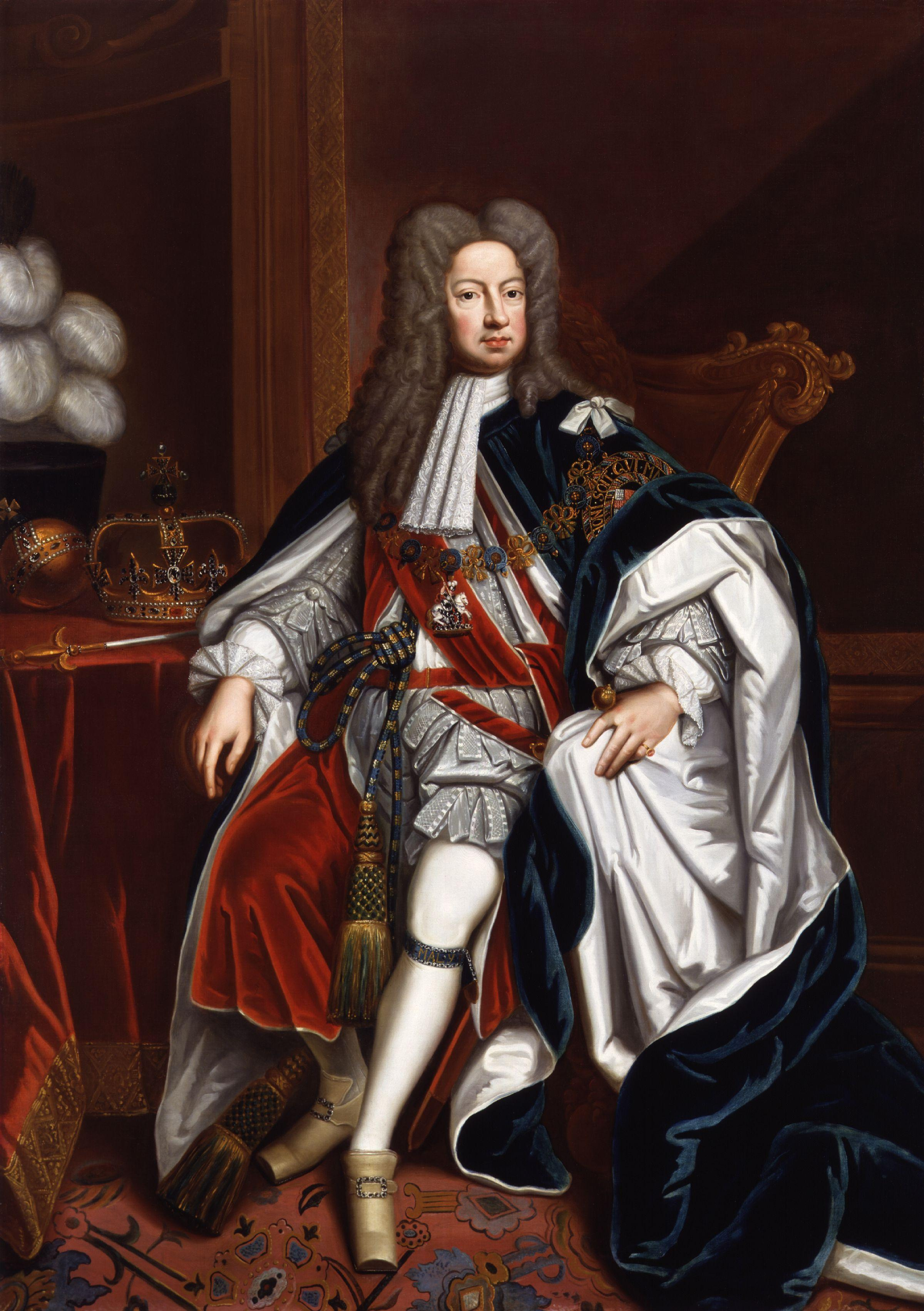
George I depicted with the state crown and in the robes of the Order of the Garter

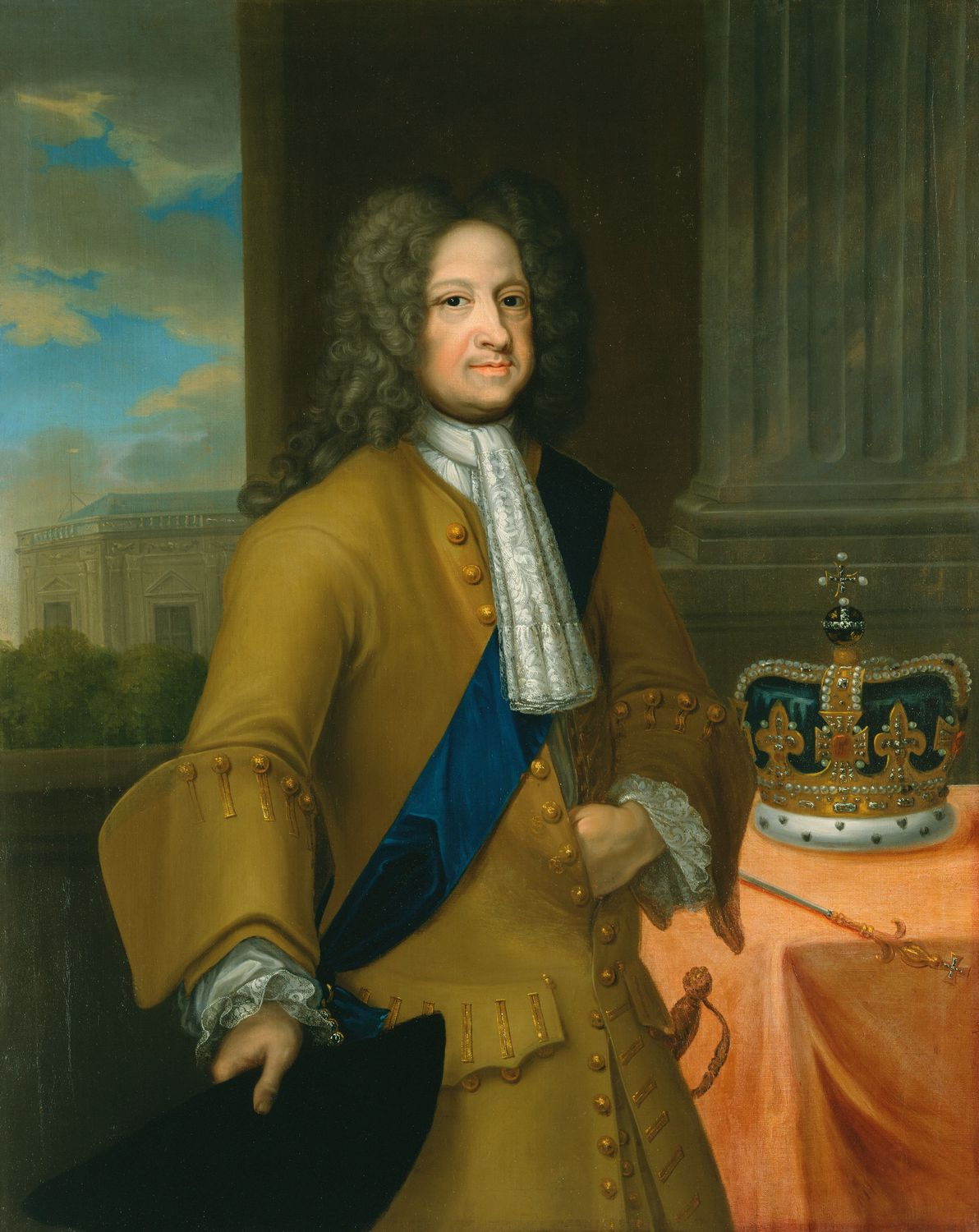
George I with the state crown, painted sometime between 1720 and 1727

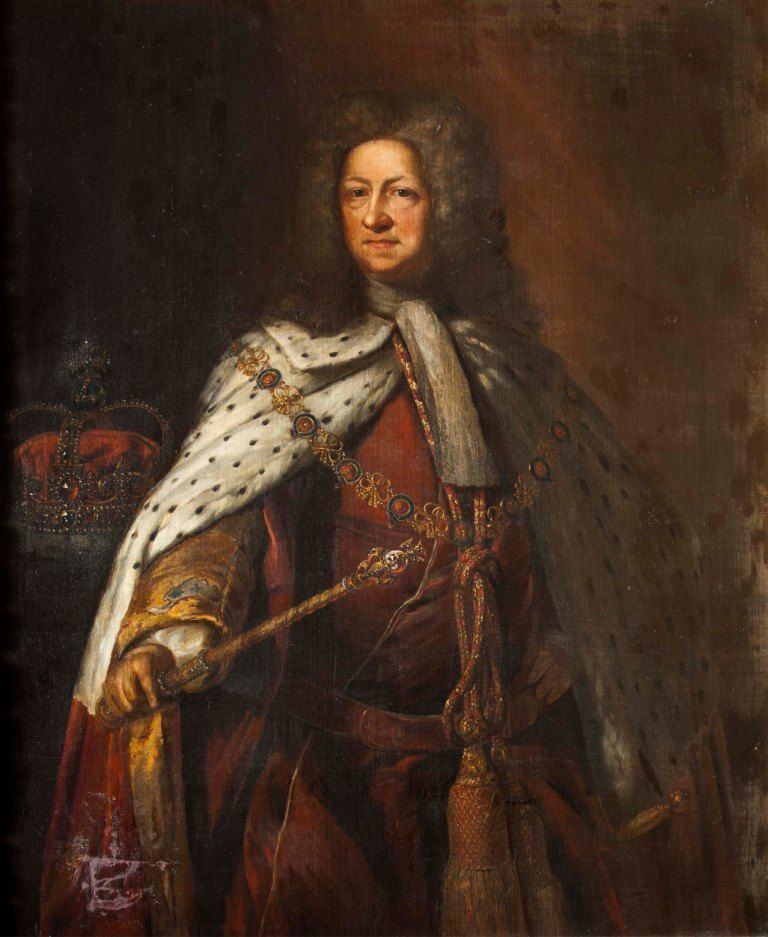
George II in coronation robes, 1727

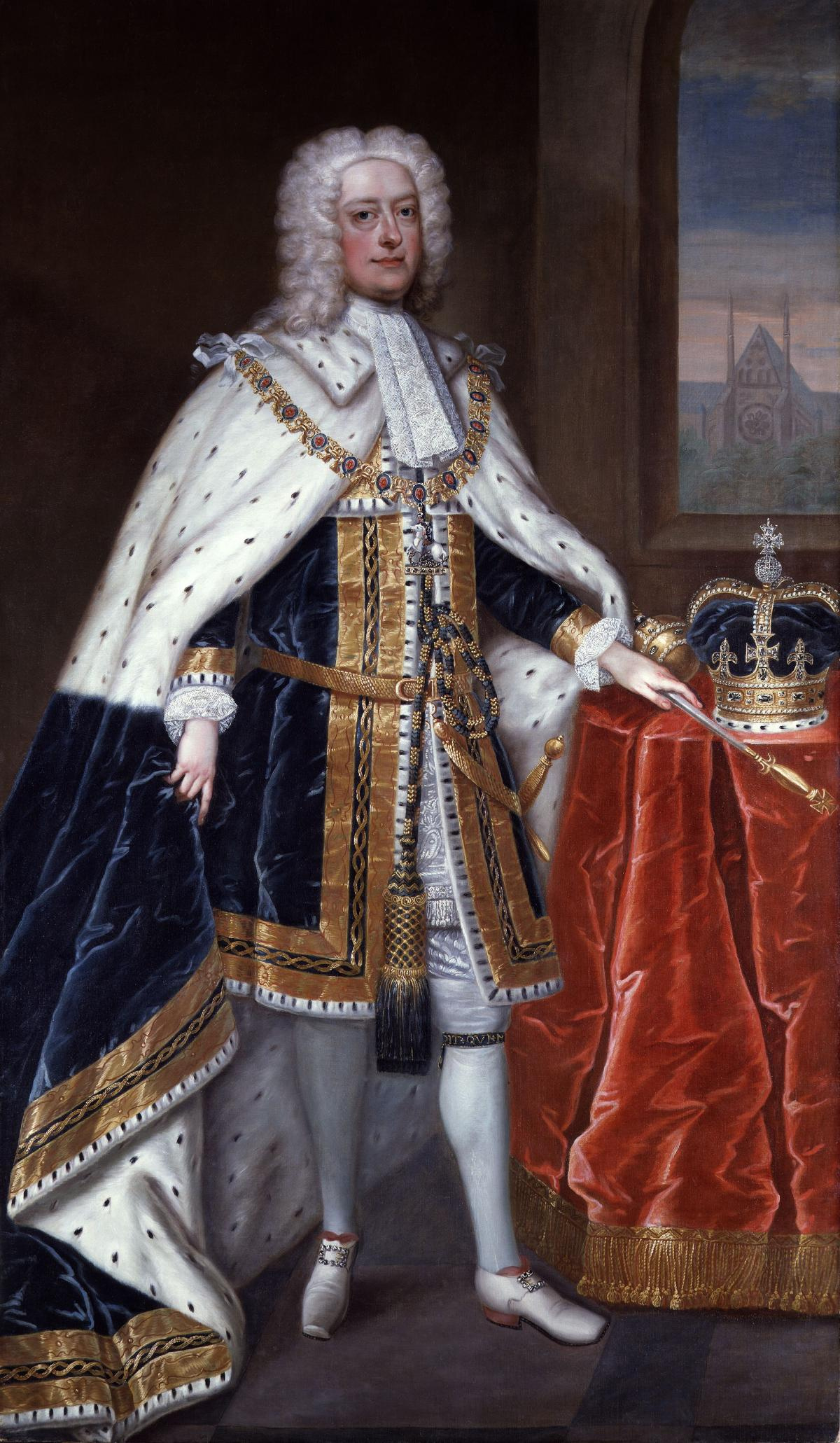
George II with the state crown, c. 1727

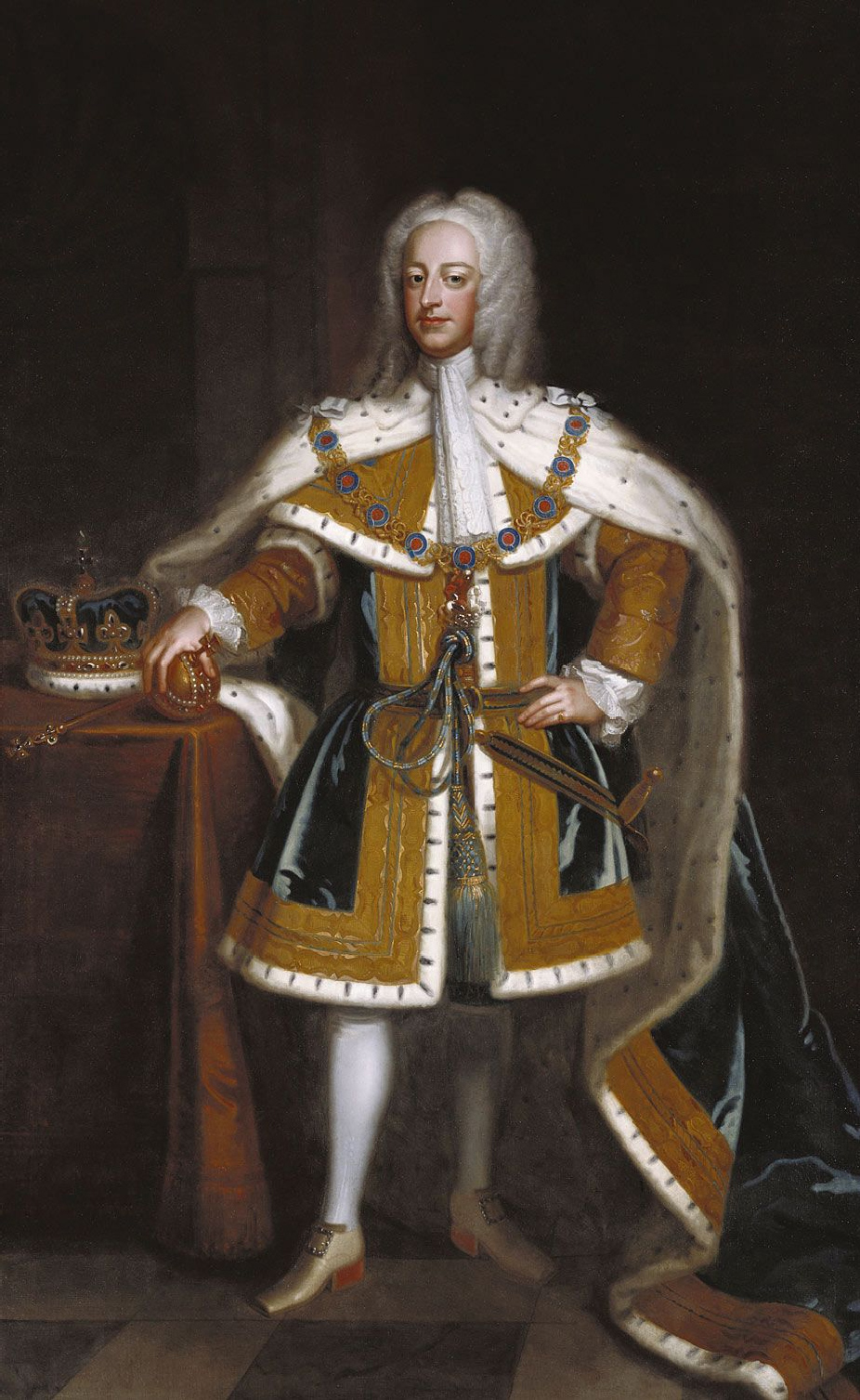
George II with the state crown, c. 1730

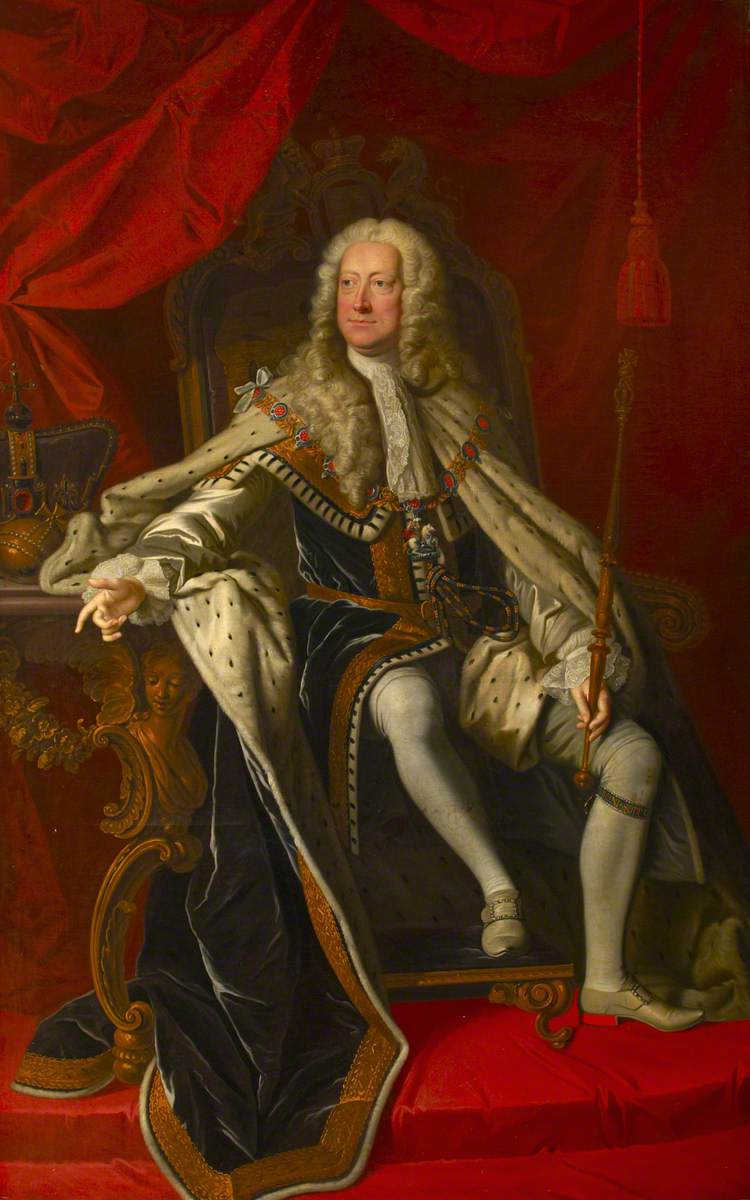
George II, 1744

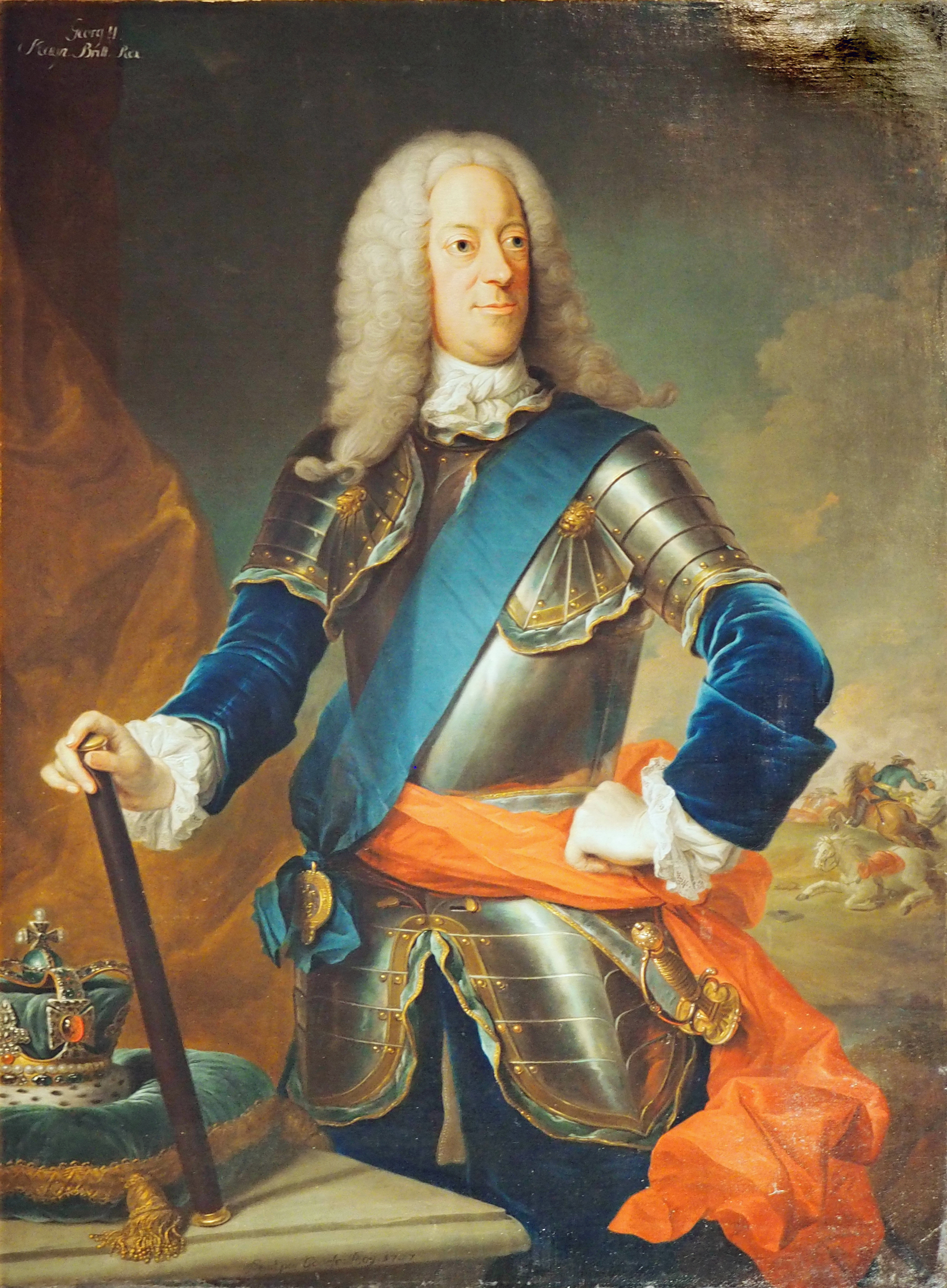
George II, 1747

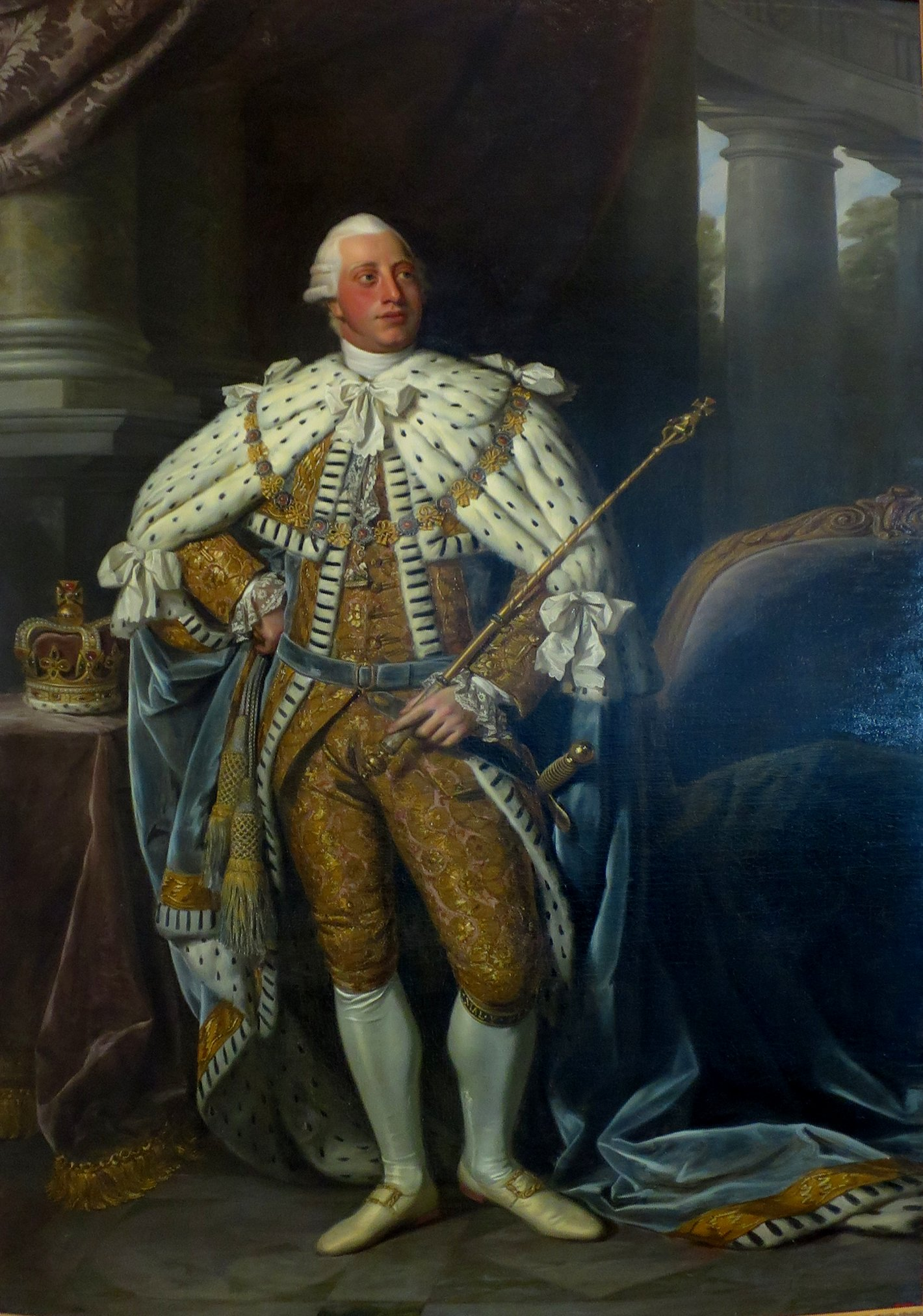
George III with the state crown, 1773

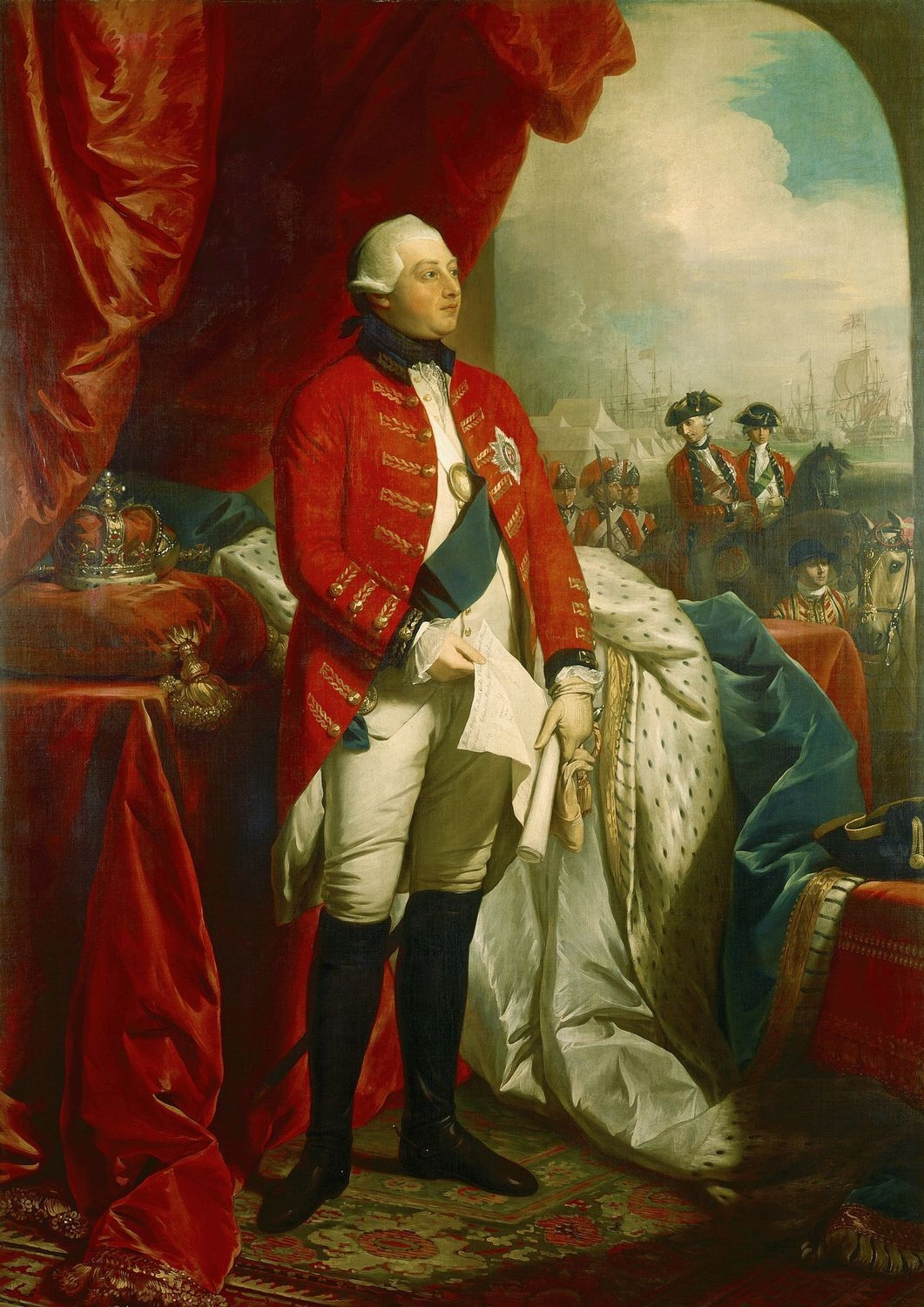
George III with the state crown, 1779

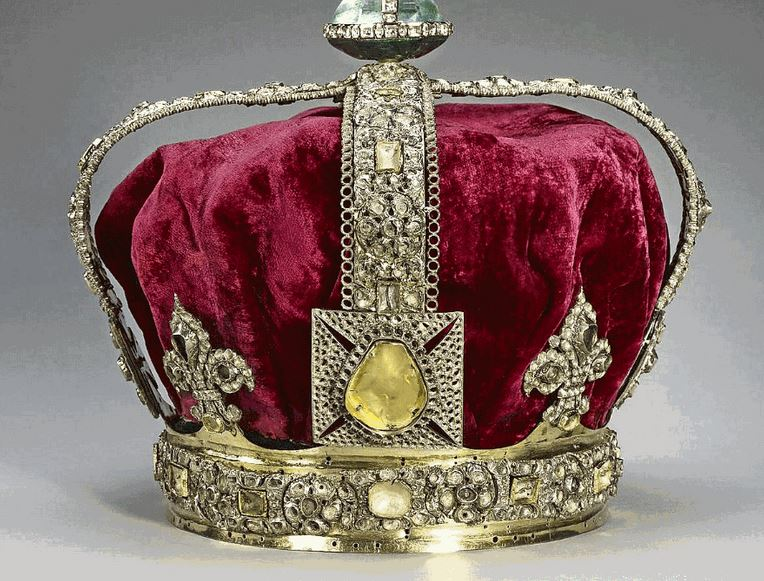
The emptied state crown
