= State crown =

Working crown worn by a monarch

A state crown is the working crown worn or used by a monarch on recurring state occasions such as when opening Parliament in Britain, as opposed to the coronation crown with which they would be formally crowned.

Some state crowns might however be used during parts of the coronation ceremony. In isolated cases, individual monarchs sometimes chose to use their state crown instead of the official coronation crown for the crowning, but those cases were exceptions rather than the norm.

Some states where there was no ceremonial coronation only had state crowns, or neither as in Belgium.

== British state crowns ==
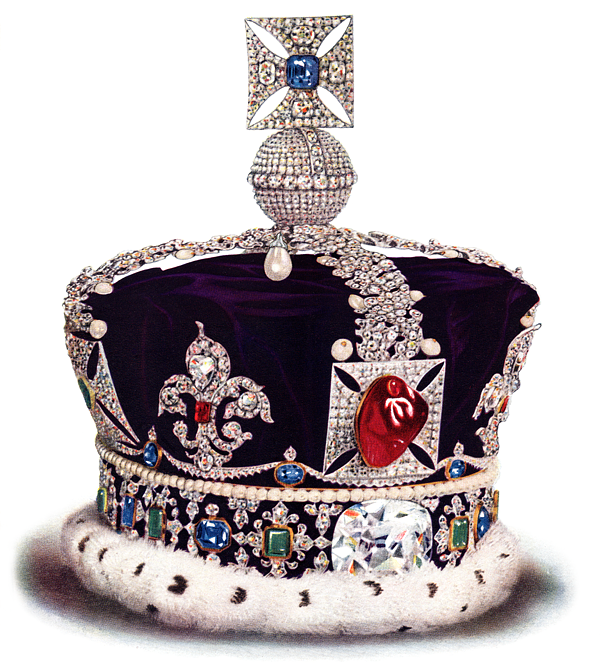
The British Imperial State Crown

The term state crown was particularly used in the Kingdom of England and its successor Kingdom of Great Britain to describe the crowns of Kings Charles II and George I that were worn on occasions such as the State Opening of Parliament. While the crown of Charles no longer exists, the jewel-less frame of the State Crown of George I is still kept among the British Crown Jewels. Because they were more frequently in use, in contrast to a coronation crown which was usually only worn once during each reign, state crowns were repeatedly replaced due to wear and tear.

Because of its age and fragility, the State Crown of George I was replaced by Queen Victoria's Imperial State Crown in 1838. This was replaced by a faithful copy of the 1838 crown in 1937.
