= Coronation portraits of the United Kingdom =

Portraits of monarchs

In the United Kingdom, state portraits have been commissioned of several monarchs which usually depict them in their coronation robes and associated with symbols of rule. These are usually large full-length paintings, which show the monarch surrounded by a crown, orb and sceptre. The earliest example of such portraits in the Royal Collection is that of James VI and I by Paul van Somer. Similar portraits have also been commissioned for consorts that have been crowned alongside the monarchs. The most recent coronation state portraits are those of Charles III and Camilla, which were unveiled in 2025. All paintings are in the medium of oil on canvas.

== Monarchs ==
Subject	Portrait	Artist	Year unveiled	Dimensions	Ref.	Details
James VI and I		Paul van Somer	1620	227.0 cm × 149.5 cm (89.4 in × 58.9 in)		
Charles I		Anthony van Dyck	1636	248.0 cm × 153.6 cm (97.6 in × 60.5 in)		
Charles II		John Michael Wright	1676	281.9 cm × 239.2 cm (111.0 in × 94.2 in)		
James II and VII		Godfrey Kneller	1684	245.6 cm × 144.1 cm (96.6 in × 56.7 in)		see article
William III and II		Godfrey Kneller	1690	243.8 cm × 147.7 cm (96.0 in × 58.1 in)		
Mary II		Godfrey Kneller	1690	223.2 cm × 148.8 cm (87.9 in × 58.6 in)		
Anne		Godfrey Kneller	1702	109.0 cm × 134.0 cm (42.9 in × 52.8 in)		
George I		Godfrey Kneller	1719	240.3 cm × 148.0 cm (94.6 in × 58.3 in)		
George II		Charles Jervas	1727	219.7 cm × 128.3 cm (86.5 in × 50.5 in)		see article
George III		Allan Ramsay	1762	249.5 cm × 163.2 cm (98.2 in × 64.3 in)		see article
George IV		Thomas Lawrence	1821	295.4 cm × 205.4 cm (116.3 in × 80.9 in)		see article
William IV		William Beechey	1832	214 cm × 150 cm (84 in × 59 in)		see article
Victoria		John Hayter	1838	128.3 cm × 102.9 cm (50.5 in × 40.5 in)		see article
Edward VII		Luke Fildes	1902	265.7 cm × 170.1 cm (104.6 in × 67.0 in)		see article
George V		Luke Fildes	1912	279.8 cm × 183.3 cm (110.2 in × 72.2 in)		see article
George VI		Gerald Kelly	1945	273.8 cm × 182.9 cm (107.8 in × 72.0 in)		see article
Elizabeth II		Herbert James Gunn	1954	244.5 cm × 152.9 cm (96.3 in × 60.2 in)		see article
Charles III		Peter Kuhfeld	2025	226.4 cm × 155.8 cm (89.1 in × 61.3 in)		see article

Edward VIII abdicated before his coronation could take place so never received a coronation portrait.

== Consorts ==
Subject	Portrait	Artist	Year unveiled	Dimensions	Ref.	Details
Mary of Modena		Godfrey Kneller	1687	219 cm × 141 cm (86.2 in × 55.5 in)		
Caroline of Ansbach		Charles Jervas	1727	218.5 cm × 127.6 cm (86.0 in × 50.2 in)		see article
Charlotte of Mecklenburg-Strelitz		Allan Ramsay	1762	249.0 cm × 161.6 cm (98.0 in × 63.6 in)		see article
Adelaide of Saxe-Meiningen		John Simpson	1832	272 cm × 178.5 cm (107 in × 70.3 in)		see article
Alexandra of Denmark		Luke Fildes	1905	265.3 cm × 170.6 cm (104.4 in × 67.2 in)		see article
Mary of Teck		William Llewellyn	1912	279.9 cm × 183.7 cm (110.2 in × 72.3 in)		see article
Elizabeth Bowes-Lyon		Gerald Kelly	1945	276.0 cm × 184.7 cm (108.7 in × 72.7 in)		see article
Camilla Shand		Paul S. Benney	2025	226.4 cm × 155.8 cm (89.1 in × 61.3 in)		see article

=== Spouses not painted ===
Not all monarchs' spouses received a coronation portrait, usually because they were not themselves crowned. Male consorts (i.e. husbands of queens regnant) do not traditionally share their wives' rank so are not crowned as kings, hence there are no coronation portraits of:

- George of Denmark and Norway, husband of Anne.
- Albert of Saxe-Coburg and Gotha, husband of Victoria (whom in any case she did not marry until after her coronation).
- Philip of Greece and Denmark, husband of Elizabeth II.

Some kings' wives did not attain the status of queen consort:

- Anne Hyde, first wife of James II and VII, who died before his accession.
- Sophia Dorothea of Celle, wife of George I, whom he divorced before his accession.
- Wallis Simpson, wife of Edward VIII, who could not marry him until after he had abdicated.
- Diana Spencer, first wife of Charles III, who both divorced him and died before his accession.

Others were recognised as queen but were not crowned:

- Henrietta Maria of France, wife of Charles I, was a Catholic so could not be anointed or crowned by the Church of England.
- Catherine of Braganza, wife of Charles II, married him after his coronation and was also barred due to Catholicism.
- Caroline of Brunswick, wife of George IV, was physically barred from attending the coronation of her husband (who had attempted to divorce her) and died shortly afterwards. However, Thomas Lawrence, George's chosen artist, had already made two other portraits of her: Caroline, Princess of Wales and Princess Charlotte (1801) and Princess Caroline of Brunswick-Wolfenbüttel (1804).
