= Coronation portraits of George V and Mary =

Paintings by Luke Fildes and William Llewellyn

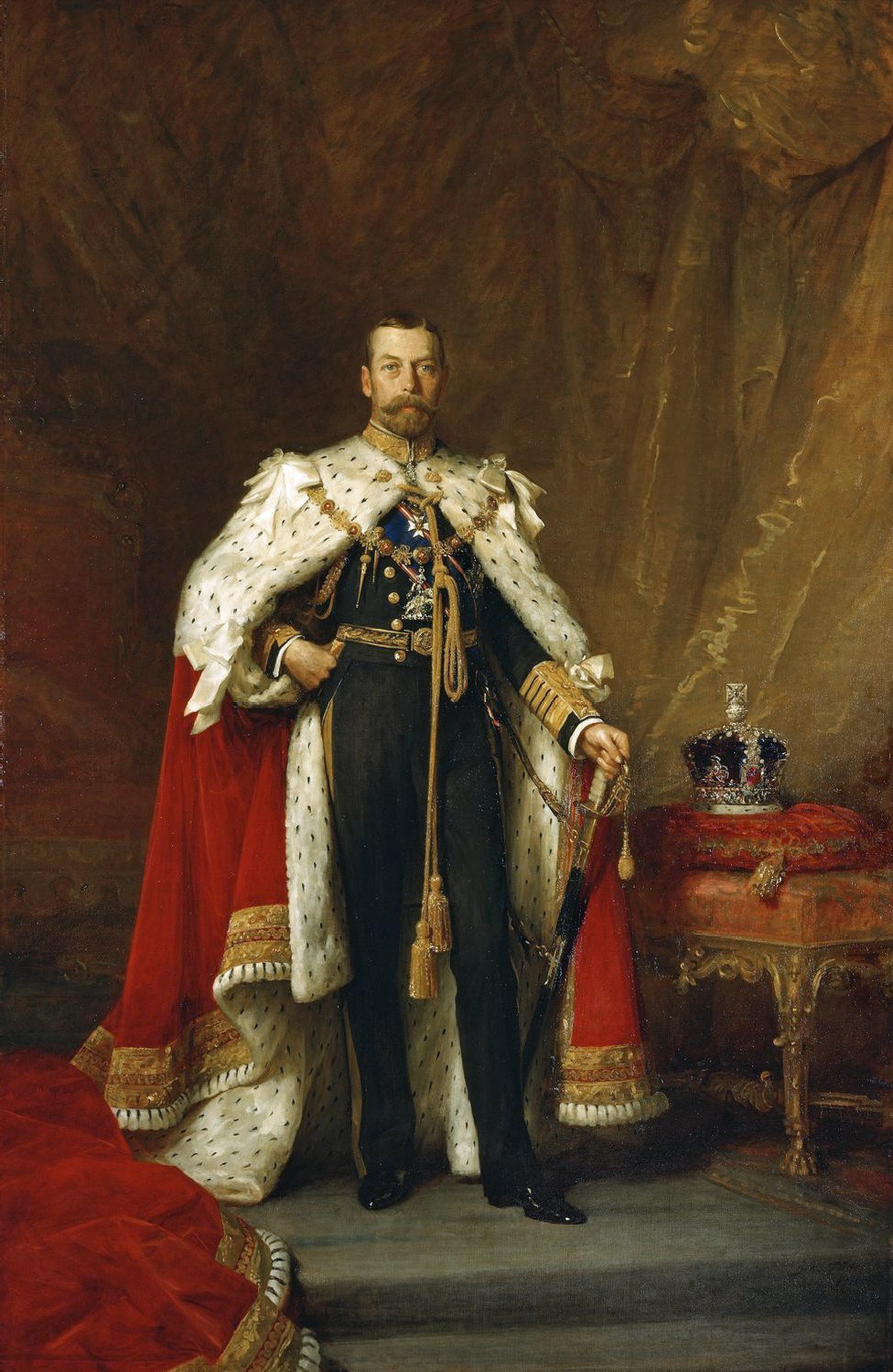
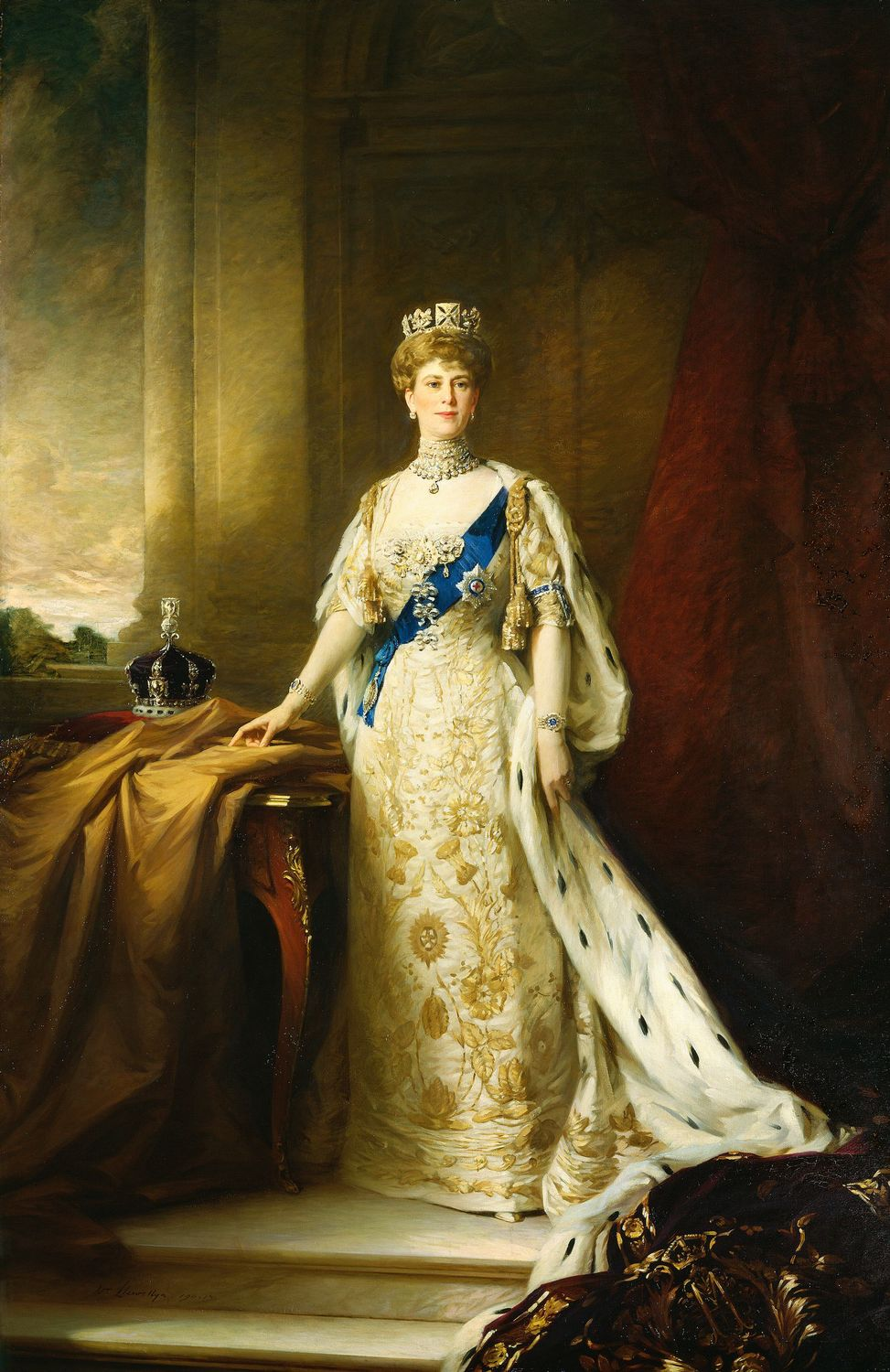
- Artists: Luke Fildes (George V); William Llewellyn (Mary)
- Year: c. 1911–1912
- Medium: Oil on canvas
- Location: Buckingham Palace, London

Coronation portraits of the British monarch King George V and his consort Queen Mary are portrait paintings from 1911–1912 by the English artist Luke Fildes and the Welsh artist William Llewellyn depicting the King and Queen in their coronation robes. Their coronation had taken place on 22 June 1911 at Westminster Abbey. The new king had inherited the crown from his father King Edward VII in 1910 at the age of 44.

Coronation portraits are usually large full-length paintings, which show the monarch in coronation robes surrounded by a crown, orb and sceptre. The King had previously sat for a portrait by Luke Fildes at the time of his marriage to Mary. Fildes had also painted the coronations portraits of his parents. The King could only sit for the portrait a few times as he had to depart to India for the 1911 Imperial Durbar and Fildes had limited access to his uniform and medals. Nevertheless, Queen Mary expressed her approval of the portrait upon its completion, which went on to be displayed at the Royal Academy of Arts in 1912. Fildes drew inspiration from both the coronation portraits of George III and George IV, yet unlike the coronation portrait of his father Edward VII, George appears smaller, more reserved, and less flamboyant. He is depicted in his coronation robes with the Imperial State Crown to his left. The principal version of the portrait is in possession of the Royal Collection and several replicas of the painting exist within the Government Art Collection and the Parliamentary Art Collection.

Queen Mary's portrait was commissioned by the Lord Chamberlain on behalf of the King in 1911. William Llewellyn had caught the Queen's eye after painting a portrait of the Countess of Marlborough. Mary sat for the portrait at least twice, which was also displayed at the Royal Academy of Arts in 1912 upon completion. In it, she is shown wearing the George IV State Diadem; her coronation robes over her coronation gown; a diamond collar; Queen Victoria's diamond stud earrings, diamond collet necklace, diamond stomacher, and bow brooches; and William IV's buckle bracelets. Her crown is depicted to her right. The principal version of the portrait is on display at Buckingham Palace, while several replicas of the painting exist within the Government Art Collection and the Parliamentary Art Collection.
