= Portrait of Prince Philip, Duke of Edinburgh =

Painting by Aubrey Davidson-Houston

- Artist: Aubrey Davidson-Houston
- Year: 1971
- Medium: Oil on canvas
- Dimensions: 299.7 cm × 172.7 cm (118.0 in × 68.0 in)
- Location: Palace of Westminster; London

Portrait of Prince Philip, Duke of Edinburgh is a portrait painting from 1971 by the Irish artist Aubrey Claud Davidson-Houston depicting Prince Philip in his ermine-trimmed robe which he had worn to his wife Queen Elizabeth II's coronation on 2 June 1953 at Westminster Abbey. Davidson-Houston had been previously commissioned to paint the Queen and drew portraits of other members of the British royal family thereafter.

The portrait was commissioned by the 6th Marquess of Cholmondeley who served as the Lord Great Chamberlain at the time. It is placed next to a replica of the coronation portrait of Elizabeth II at the Houses of Parliament and is part of the Parliamentary Art Collection. In the portrait Philip is shown wearing full dress naval uniform and his ermine-trimmed robe while the gardens at Buckingham Palace are visible in the background.
