= Coronation of King George =

Coronation of King George may refer to:

- Coronation of George II in 1727
- Coronation of George III in 1761
- Coronation of George IV in 1821
- Coronation of George V in 1911
- Coronation of George VI in 1937
