= Portrait of George III (Lawrence, 1809) =

1809 painting by Thomas Lawrence

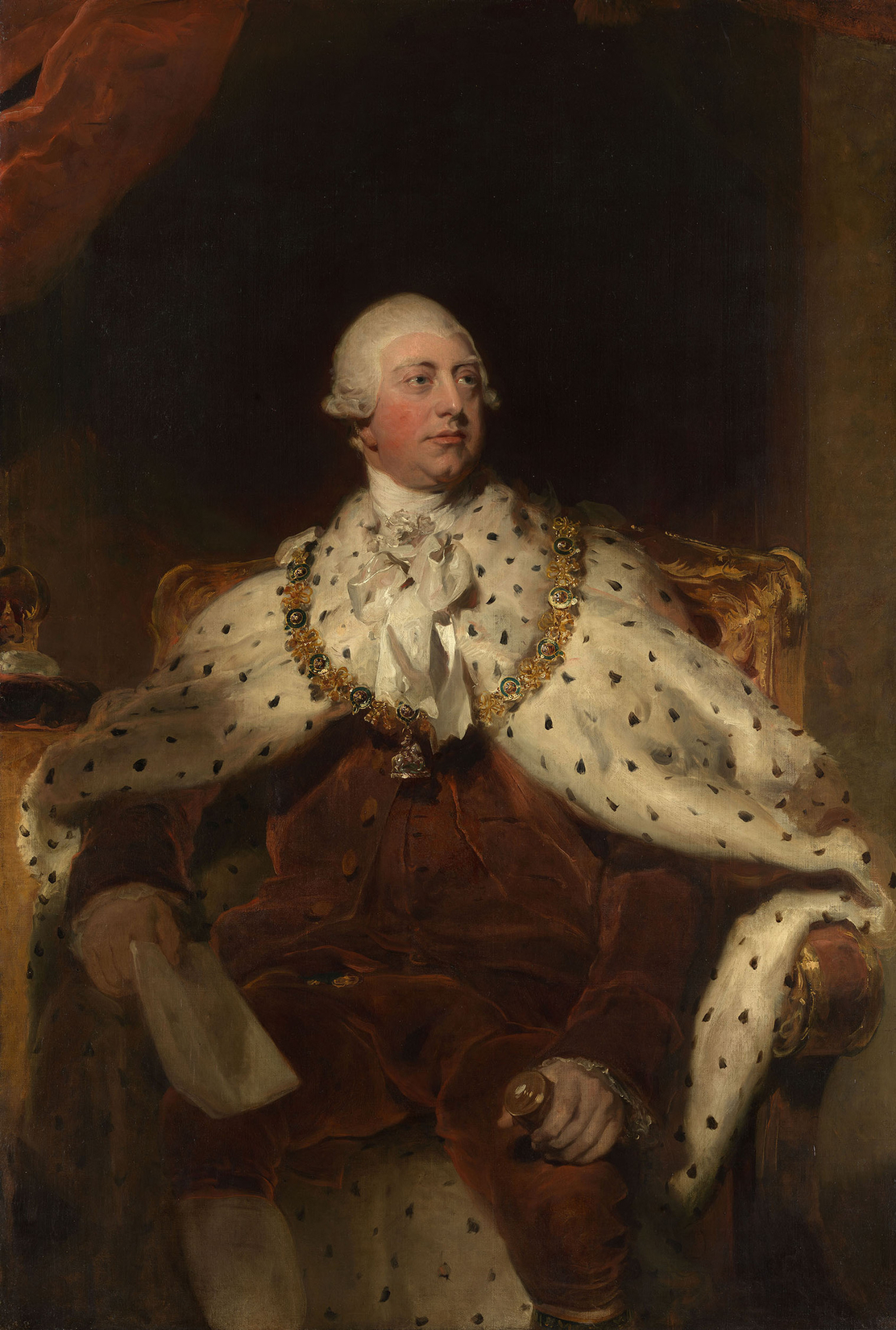
- Artist: Thomas Lawrence
- Year: 1809
- Type: Oil on canvas, portrait
- Dimensions: 72.3 cm × 116.2 cm (28.5 in × 45.7 in)
- Location: Royal Collection, London

George III is an 1809 portrait painting by the English artist Thomas Lawrence depicting the British monarch George III. It is an oil painting on canvas depicting the King in his robes for the State Opening of Parliament. It was commissioned by George as a gift for the former Prime Minister of the United Kingdom Henry Addington. George had reigned since 1760, but he was troubled by occasional bouts of mental instability. In 1810, shortly after celebrating the Golden Jubilee on the throne, George was overcome by a more lasting loss of control and his eldest son George was declared Prince Regent. The image by Lawrence continued to be used to represent the King throughout the remainder of his reign.

George is shown in a pose that mixes the ceremonial and the informal. The King wears his robes of state and holds a document in one hand. It is now part of the Royal Collection.

== See also ==
- Coronation Portrait of George III, 1762 painting by Allan Ramsay

== Bibliography ==
- Ingamells, John. National Portrait Gallery Mid-Georgian Portraits, 1760-1790. National Portrait Gallery, 2004.
- Levey, Michael. Sir Thomas Lawrence. ISBN 0300109989. Yale University Press, 2005.
