= Coronation portraits of George II and Caroline =

Paintings by Luke Fildes and William Llewellyn

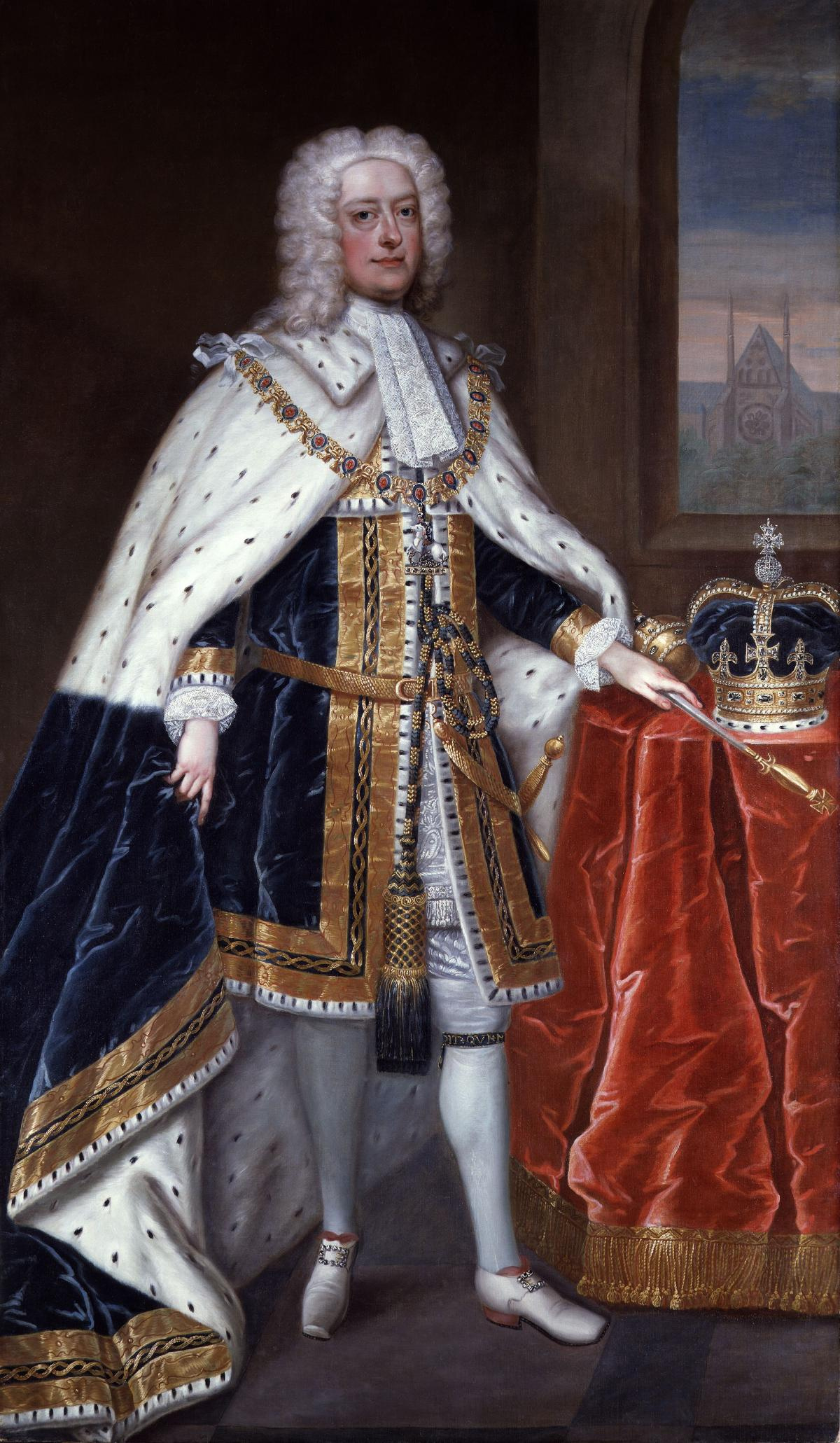
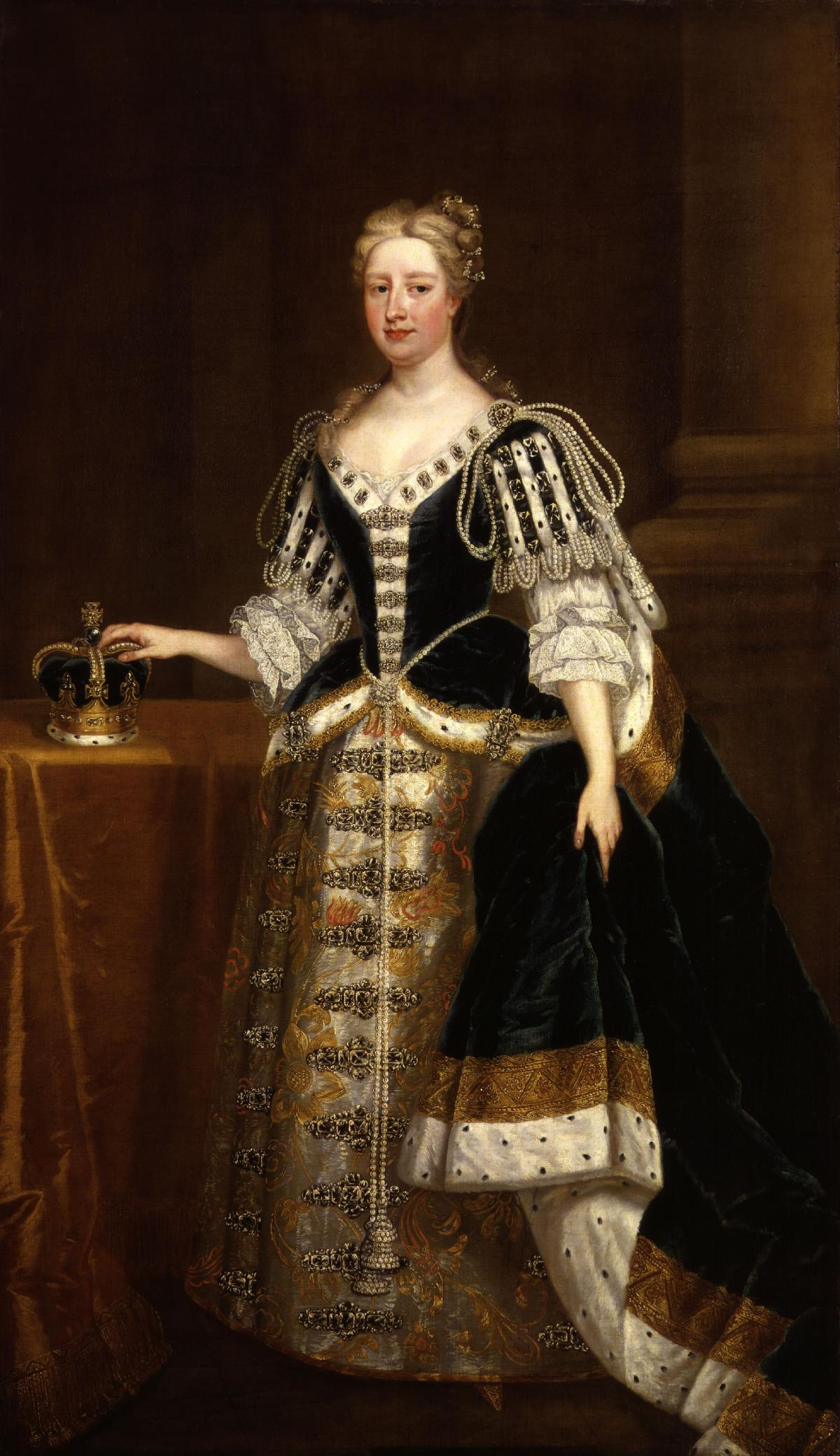
- Artist: Charles Jervas
- Year: c. 1727
- Medium: Oil on canvas

Coronation portraits of the British monarch King George II and his consort Queen Caroline are portrait paintings from 1727 by the Irish artist Charles Jervas depicting the King and Queen in their coronation robes. Their coronation had taken place on 11 October 1727 (O.S.) at Westminster Abbey. The new king had inherited the crown from his father King George I earlier in 1727 at the age of 43.

Coronation portraits are usually large full-length paintings, which show the monarch in coronation robes surrounded by a crown, orb and sceptre. George II commissioned the coronation portraits in 1727 which would have served as the official state portraits. Jervas had been commissioned by Queen Caroline to paint a portrait of Prince William. A version of George's coronation portrait is at the Guildhall Art Gallery and several other replicas exist but George Vertue notes that Jervas eventually "lost much favour and interest at court". This could explain why neither portraits are part of the Royal Collection. An "average version" of Caroline's portrait is kept beside George's at the Guildhall, though the originals have not been located. Better versions of the portraits were seen at a sale by Sotheby's in January 1964.

The King's portrait shows the north transept of Westminster Abbey which is seen through a window to his left. He wears the collar of the Order of the Garter over his blue coronation robes and has a grey patterned suit and breeches on. His left hand holds a sceptre that rests on a table together with a crown and orb. The Queen's portrait shows her wearing her robes over a "grey half-sleeved dress with gold and red flower pattern". The dress is adorned with jewels from her own collection, as well as pieces from "the ladies of quality", "the Jews and jewellers" according to Lord Hervey.

Other state portraits of the King and Queen exist with the Royal Collection. Enoch Seeman was commissioned to paint two portraits of George and Caroline soon after their accession c. 1730. Both portraits were originally hanging at the Queen's Gallery in Kensington until George's was moved to St George's Hall in Windsor to be hanged alongside a series of full-length portraits of monarchs. Caroline's portrait was sent to Hampton Court. The King is depicted with his hand on the orb which is next to the crown and sceptre on a table top. He wears his state robes and the collar of the Order of the Garter. The Queen is also shown in her state robes next to her crown and sceptre.

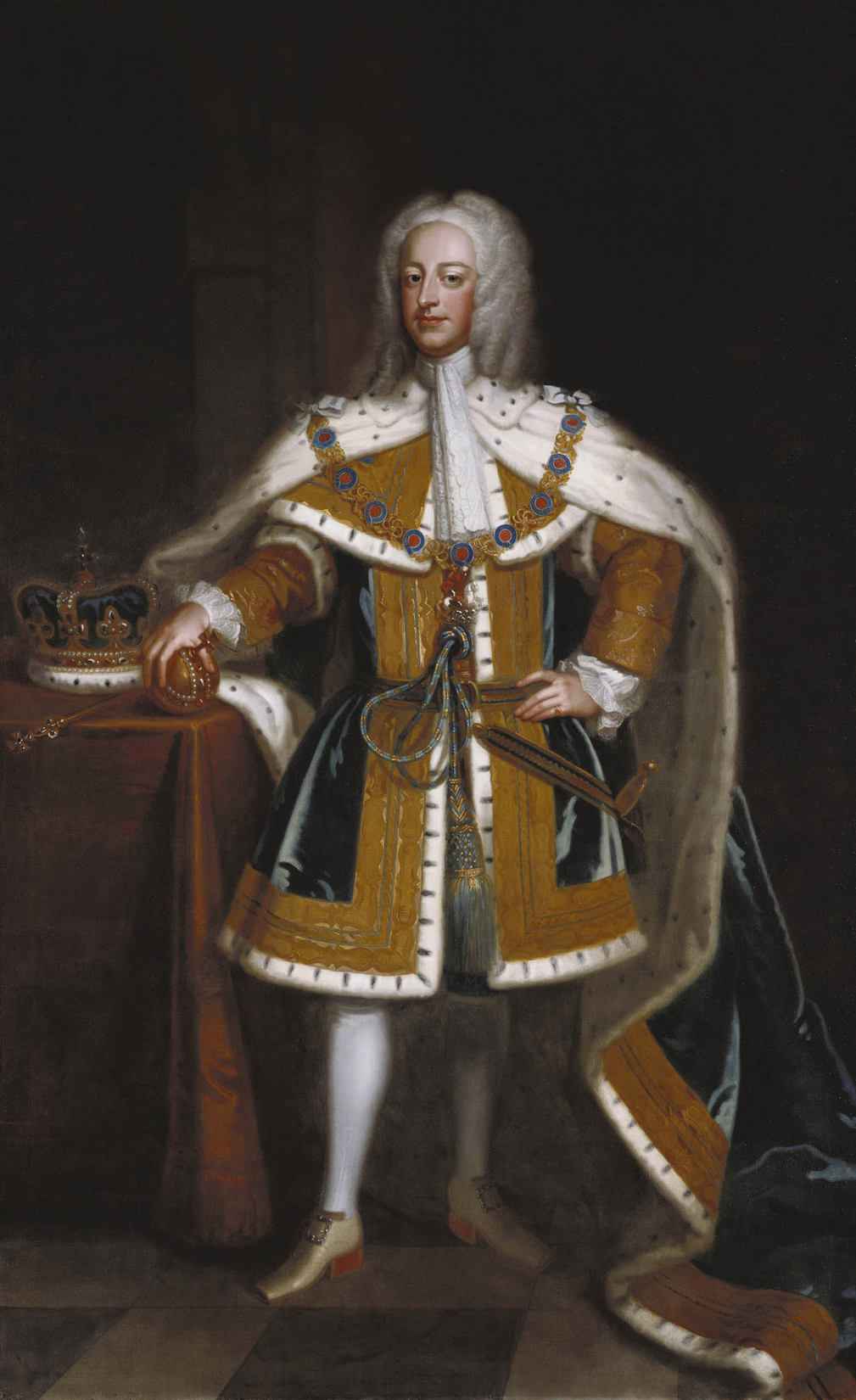
Portrait of George II by Enoch Seeman, hanging at St George's Hall, Windsor Castle

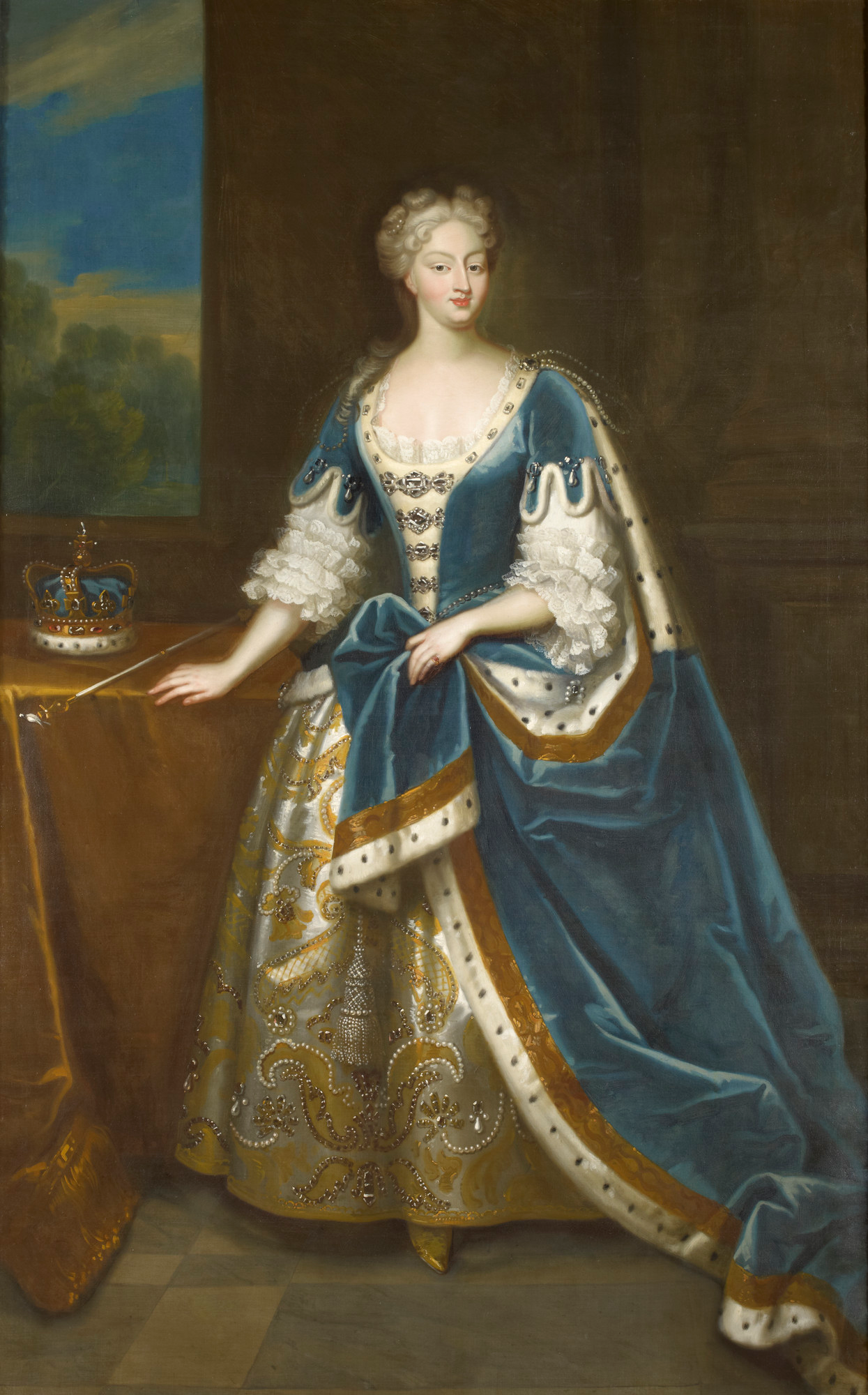
Portrait of Caroline by Enoch Seeman, hanging at Queen Caroline's Closet, Kensington Palace

In the years after Caroline's demise, the King sat for a portrait by John Shackleton, Principal Painter in Ordinary to the monarch between 1749 and 1767. Full-length versions of this portrait hang at Wentworth Woodhouse, Scottish National Portrait Gallery, British Museum and Fishmongers' Hall, though the copy in the Royal Collection is a studio version acquired by George IV around 1820. In 1841, Queen Victoria had the painting put on display in the State Dining Room at Buckingham Palace alongside other full-length dynastic portraits. The King is shown in the portrait wearing his robes of state and holding a sceptre, while the crown and orb appear on top of a table next to him.

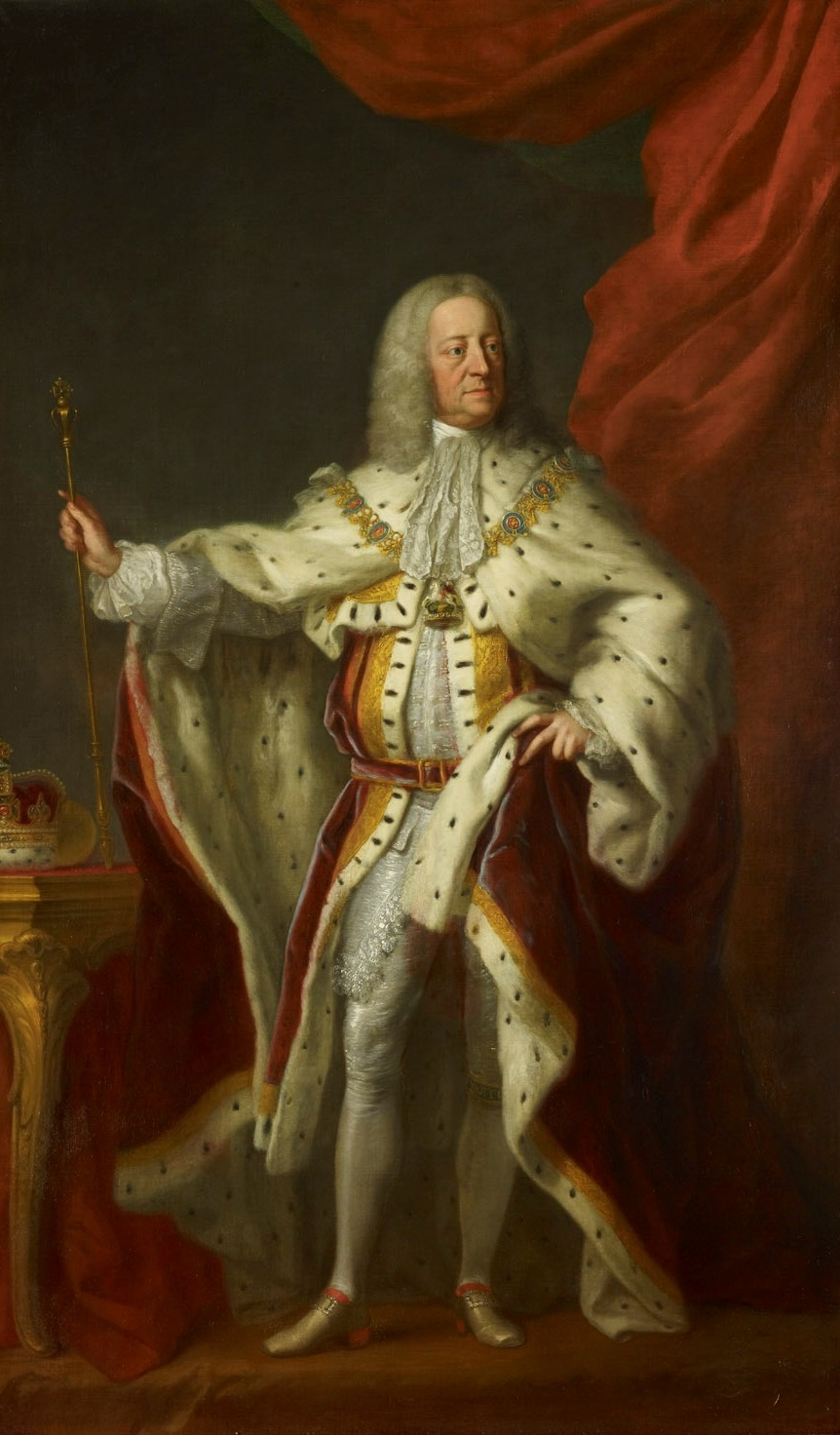
Portrait of George II from the studio of John Shackleton
