= Coronation of George II and Caroline =

1727 coronation in Great Britain

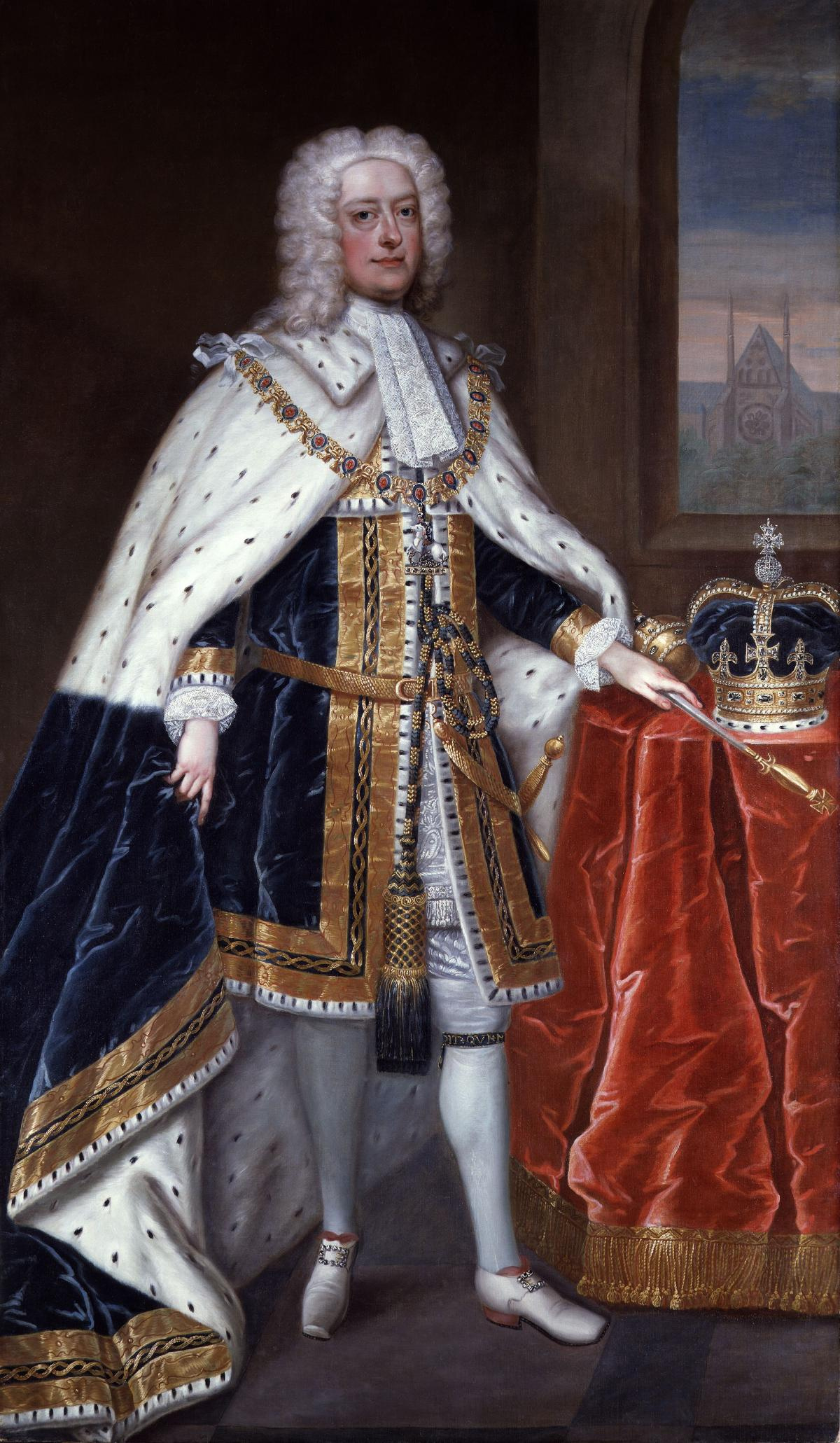
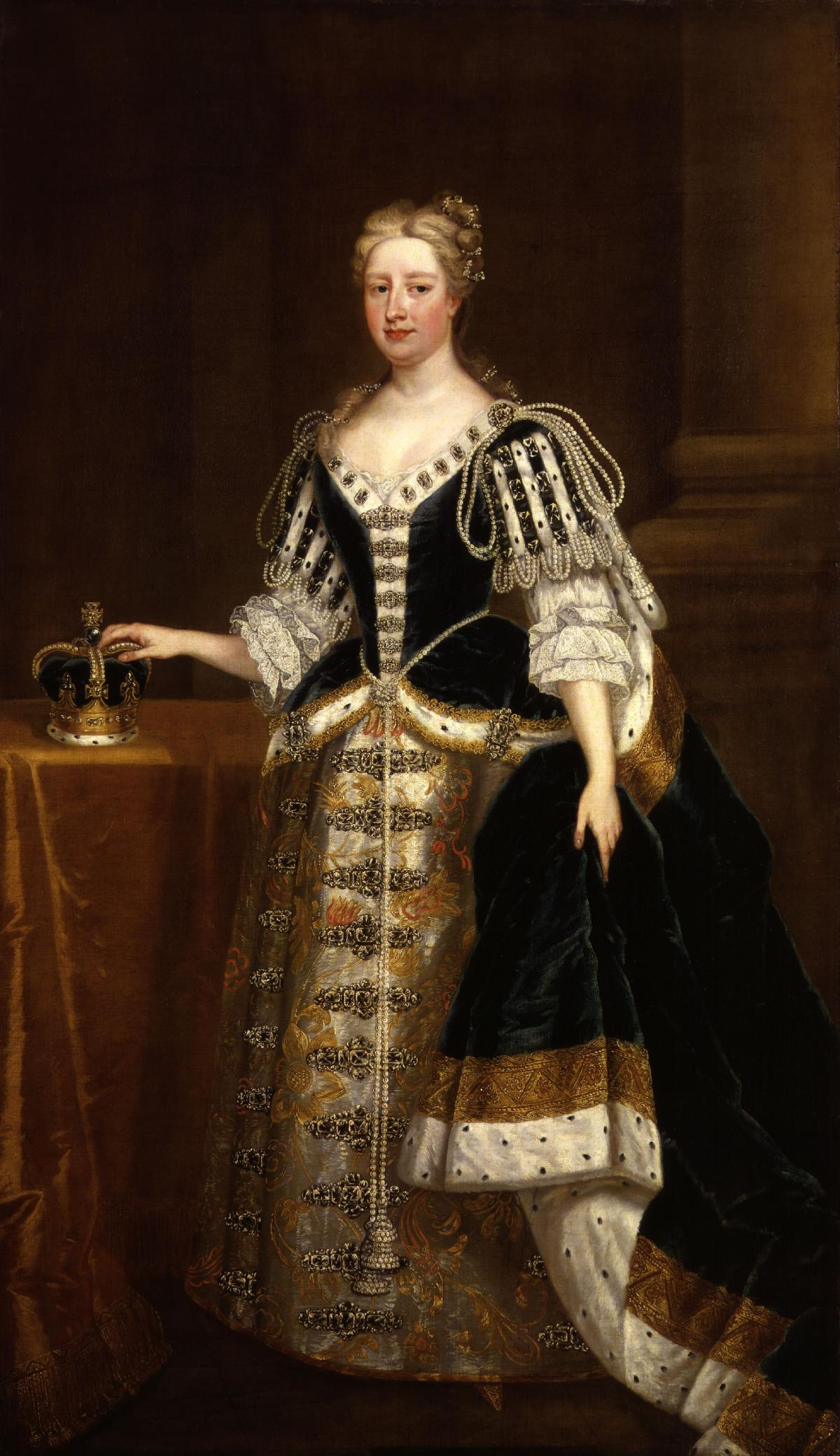
- King George II and Queen Caroline in coronation robes, by Charles Jervas
- Date: 11/22^{O.S./N.S.} October 1727
- Location: Westminster Abbey, London, England
- Budget: £8,720
- Participants: King George II; Queen Caroline; Great Officers of State; Archbishops and Bishops Assistant of the Church of England; Garter Principal King of Arms; Peers of the Realm; Mistress of the Robes

The coronation of George II and his wife Caroline as king and queen of Great Britain and Ireland took place at Westminster Abbey, London, on 11/22^{O.S./N.S.} October 1727. For the coronation, George Frideric Handel was commissioned to write four new coronation anthems, one of which, Zadok the Priest, has been sung at British coronations ever since. The coronation followed a procession to the abbey.

== Background ==
George had ascended to the throne upon the death of his father, George I, who had died of a stroke on 11 June 1727 whilst on a trip to his native Hanover. There were fears that the prime minister, Robert Walpole would be replaced upon the royal succession; however, Queen Caroline supported Walpole and advised George to keep him in office, which he did. George and Caroline attended celebrations for Lord Mayor's Day on 6 October.

=== Preparations ===
The coronation was budgeted at £8,720. By tradition, ceremonial preparations ought to have been conducted by the hereditary Earl Marshal, Thomas Howard, 8th Duke of Norfolk; however, being a Roman Catholic, he was debarred, and the role was deputised to Talbot Yelverton, 1st Earl of Sussex.

Scaffolding was erected in Westminster Abbey to seat 140 foreign visitors, with four seats allocated for "those who sold Wine, Coffee &c. in the Abbey". There were also 60 seats for the choir and "the Private Musick". Tickets for a front seat cost 10 guineas (£10.50) each. There were a total of 1,780 people seated in the abbey on the day of the coronation.

A contemporary newspaper report states that there was a choir of 40 and a full orchestra of 160 musicians, although an official source gives the total number of musicians, choir and orchestra, as 185. They were accommodated in temporary galleries over and above the altar. This is the first coronation for which public rehearsals of the music were held and the first for which the printed sheet music was published.

== Procession ==
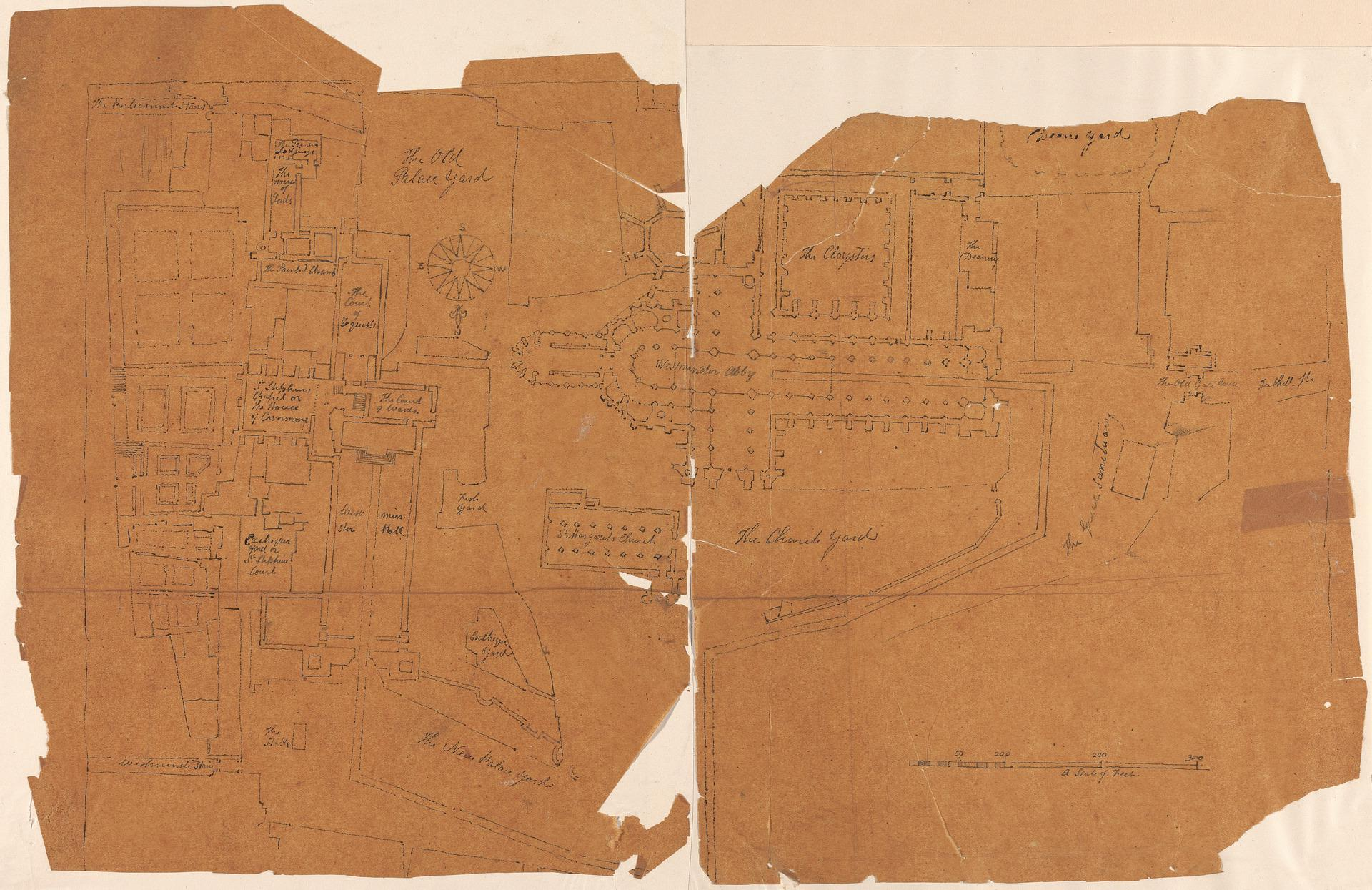
Map of the coronation route taken with south at the top

At 8 am, peers involved in the procession met in the House of Lords and the peeresses met in the Painted Chamber; those who were not peers met in the Court of Requests. Coaches arriving at the Hall passed through Channel Row and across Old Palace Yard and New Palace Yard. They were then discharged and proceeded up Millbank and Channel Row, and passed along Charles Street (now King Charles Street). They then passed through Story's Gate (now Storey's Gate) and the gate at Little Dean's Yard before arriving at the abbey. After the passengers of the coaches disembarked, the coaches left the abbey and proceeded to Hyde Park Corner by turning up Little Queen Street (Now Old Queen Street); they returned via the same route in the evening.

== Service ==
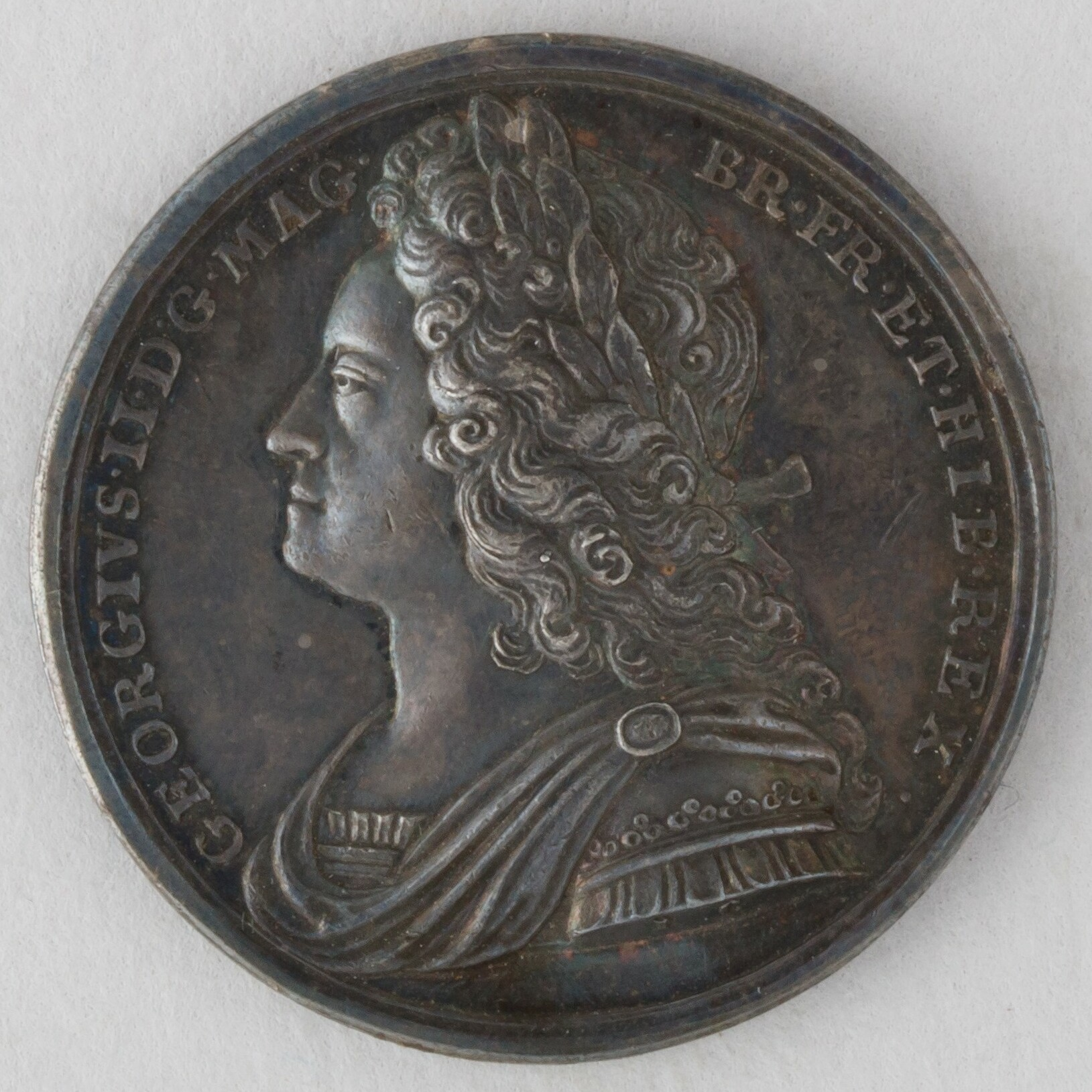
One of the silver coronation medals that were scattered around the abbey during the service and thrown into the crowd during the returning procession

The coronation ceremony was conducted by the Archbishop of Canterbury, William Wake. The King and the Queen entered the abbey with the choir and the prebendaries singing "an anthem". After the recognition and oblations were made, the litany was read by the Bishop of Gloucester and the Bishop of Bristol, and the sermon was given by the Bishop of Oxford. The king then took the coronation oath and was anointed on the "Head, the Breast, and Palms of his Hands" with holy oil, invested with the regalia and crowned by the archbishop. The crowning was met with cheering from the spectators, as well as trumpet fanfares in the abbey and gun salutes in Green Park and at the Tower of London; the peers wore their coronets and the bishops their caps. After the peers had pledged loyalty during the enthronement and homage, gold medals were presented to the peers and peeresses, and silver medals were scattered amongst the congregation.

Queen Caroline was also anointed, and crowned, with the Mistress of the Robes given a handkerchief to "wipe of [sic] any Oyl that might fall on the face". Additionally, Caroline's dress was reportedly so covered in precious jewels that a pulley was required to lift the skirt so that she could kneel. George and Caroline returned to St James's Palace from Westminster Hall "before Eight O'Clock".

=== Music ===
For the coronation, George Frideric Handel was commissioned to write four anthems, those being Zadok the Priest, Let Thy Hand Be Strengthened, The King Shall Rejoice, and My Heart Is Inditing. The appointment of Handel to compose the main elements of the music and to direct its performance was an innovation; in all previous coronations, the role had been given to the Composer of the Chapel Royal. This was probably caused by the death of the holder of that role, William Croft, on 14 August. His successor, Maurice Greene, had no previous experience with the Chapel Royal and the King is said to have forbidden him to compose for the event and given the job to Handel, who had no official status at court. Handel is said to have had only four weeks to complete the task. Handel also frequently reused the music from his coronation anthems in his later works.

There is little surviving information on the other music used during the service. The entrance anthem, "I was glad", probably the setting written by Francis Pigott, seems to have been omitted by accident. A setting of the Te Deum was stated to be by "Gibbons", probably Orlando Gibbons rather than his brothers, Edward or Ellis, or his son, Christopher, who were also composers. Played outside the abbey on the day of the coronation was William Cobbett's A Song to a Minuet att a Ball on the Happy Coronation Day of George our King, 11 October.

== Other celebrations ==
The Dublin Gazette reported that the coronation "in every one's Opinion, was the most magnificent of any yet seen in England". The public celebrated the event by lighting bonfires and setting off fireworks. Throughout London, flags were displayed to mark the occasion.
