= Peter Kuhfeld =

English painter

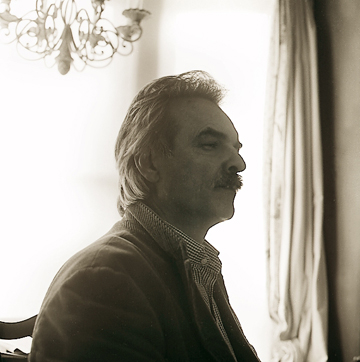
- Peter Kuhfeld © Jemimah Kuhfeld, 2004
- Born: Peter Kuhfeld; 1952 (age 73–74); Cheltenham, England
- Known for: Painter
- Movement: New English Art Club
- Spouse: Cathryn Showan
- Children: 2

Peter Kuhfeld (born 1952) is an English figurative painter. He was born in Cheltenham and is married to the English figurative painter Cathryn Kuhfeld, née Showan. They have two daughters who have often appeared in their paintings.

== Biography ==
Kuhfeld is the only child of a former German prisoner of war and an English classical pianist. Between 1972 and 1976 he studied at Leicester School of Art. He worked from 1976 to 1978 at Rugby School of Art, where he gave lessons in drawing and painting, before securing a place at the Royal Academy School of Art. During 1977-80 Kuhfeld studied under the painter Peter Greenham CBE, RA. In 1978 he was created a Freeman of the Worshipful Company of Painters.

While at the Royal Academy Schools Kuhfeld won various notable scholarships and prizes: 1978-79 David Murray Landscape Prize; 1979 Royal Academy of Art Silver Medal for Drawing, Royal College of Surgeons Dooley Prize for Anatomical Drawing; 1980 Elizabeth Greenshield Foundation Scholarship and Richard Ford Scholarship for study in Spain.

In 1985 the New Grafton Gallery in London gave Kuhfeld his first major exhibition, with the painter Christa Ga, which helped establish him as one of the up-and-coming members of the New English Art movement. In 1986 Kuhfeld was elected to membership of the New English Art Club. In 1992 he became an elected member of the Royal Society of Portrait Painters, which he resigned in 2005. In 2009, he unveiled a portrait of Harry Patch, the oldest man in Europe and last surviving World War I soldier, which Kuhfeld called "a privilege" and "was struck by this extraordinary man".

In 2012, he was commissioned by Charles, Prince of Wales to paint the royal wedding of Prince William, Duke of Cambridge and Catherine, Duchess of Cambridge. Prince Charles had been a patron of his and Kuhfeld painted portraits of Prince William and Prince Harry in 1986.

For the event of the 2023 coronation of Charles III and Camilla, Kuhfeld was selected by King Charles III to paint his state portrait. The portrait was unveiled on 6 May 2025.
