= Coronation portraits of William IV and Adelaide =

Paintings by William Beechey and John Simpson

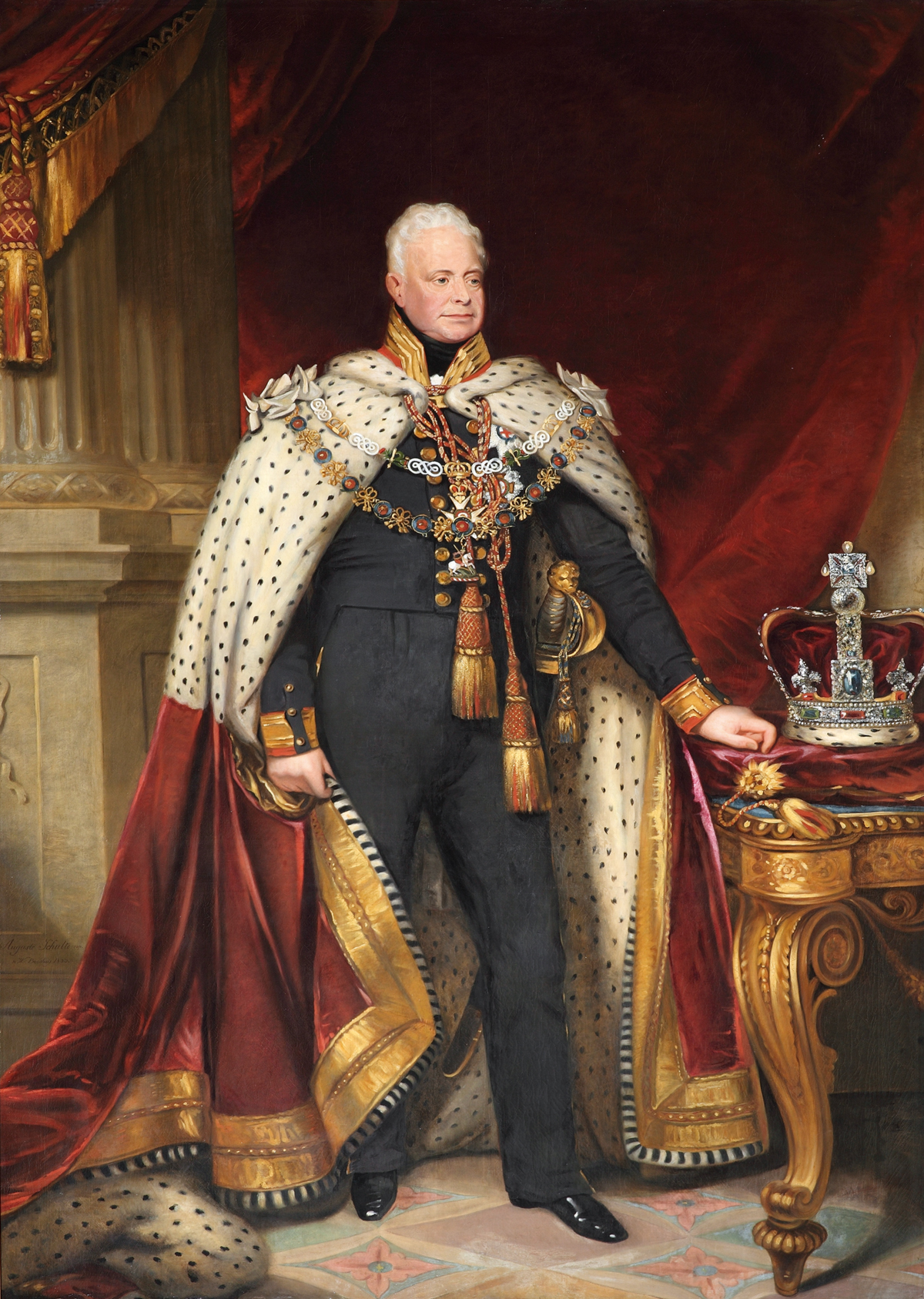
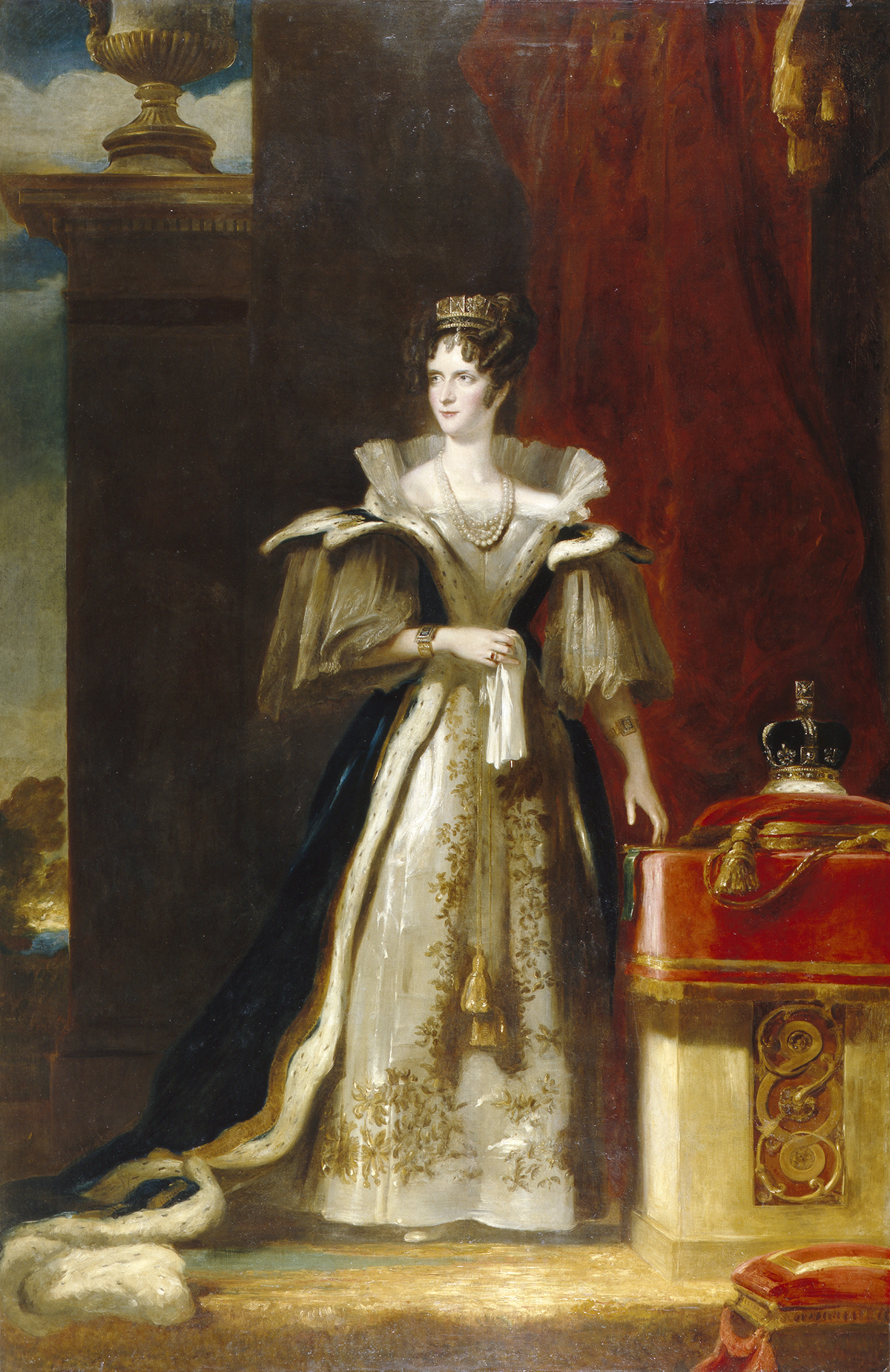
- Artist: William Beechey (William IV); John Simpson (Adelaide)
- Year: c. 1831–32
- Medium: Oil on canvas

Coronation portraits of the British monarch King William IV and his consort Queen Adelaide are portrait paintings from the early 1830s by the British artists William Beechey and John Simpson depicting the King and Queen in their coronation robes. Their coronation had taken place on 8 September 1831 at Westminster Abbey. The new king had inherited the crown from his elder brother King George IV in 1830 at the age of 64.

Coronation portraits are usually large full-length paintings, which show the monarch in coronation robes surrounded by a crown, orb and sceptre. Beechey was a notable portraitist and his subjects included various members of the royalty and political figures, including William IV's father George III. He had been appointed portrait painter to William's mother Queen Charlotte in 1793. The portrait depicts the King standing next to St Edward's Crown. Today versions of it are in the Royal Hospital Chelsea and the Residence Museum in the Celle Palace.

Simpson's portrait of Queen Adelaide wearing the George IV State Diadem and in her robes, which shows her standing next to her crown, is on display at the Brighton Museum & Art Gallery.

Another set of portraits of the King and Queen by Beechey, which show them enthroned and in coronation robes are part of the Parliamentary Art Collection.

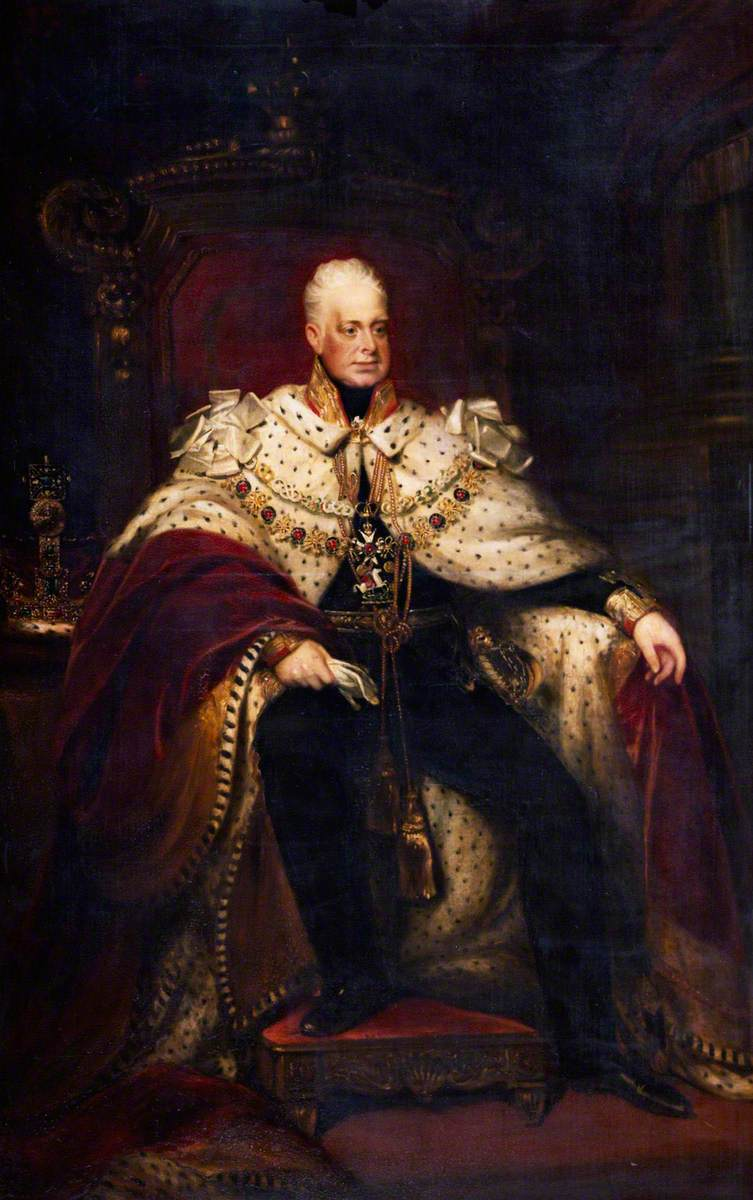
Portrait of William IV by William Beechey; Parliamentary Art Collection

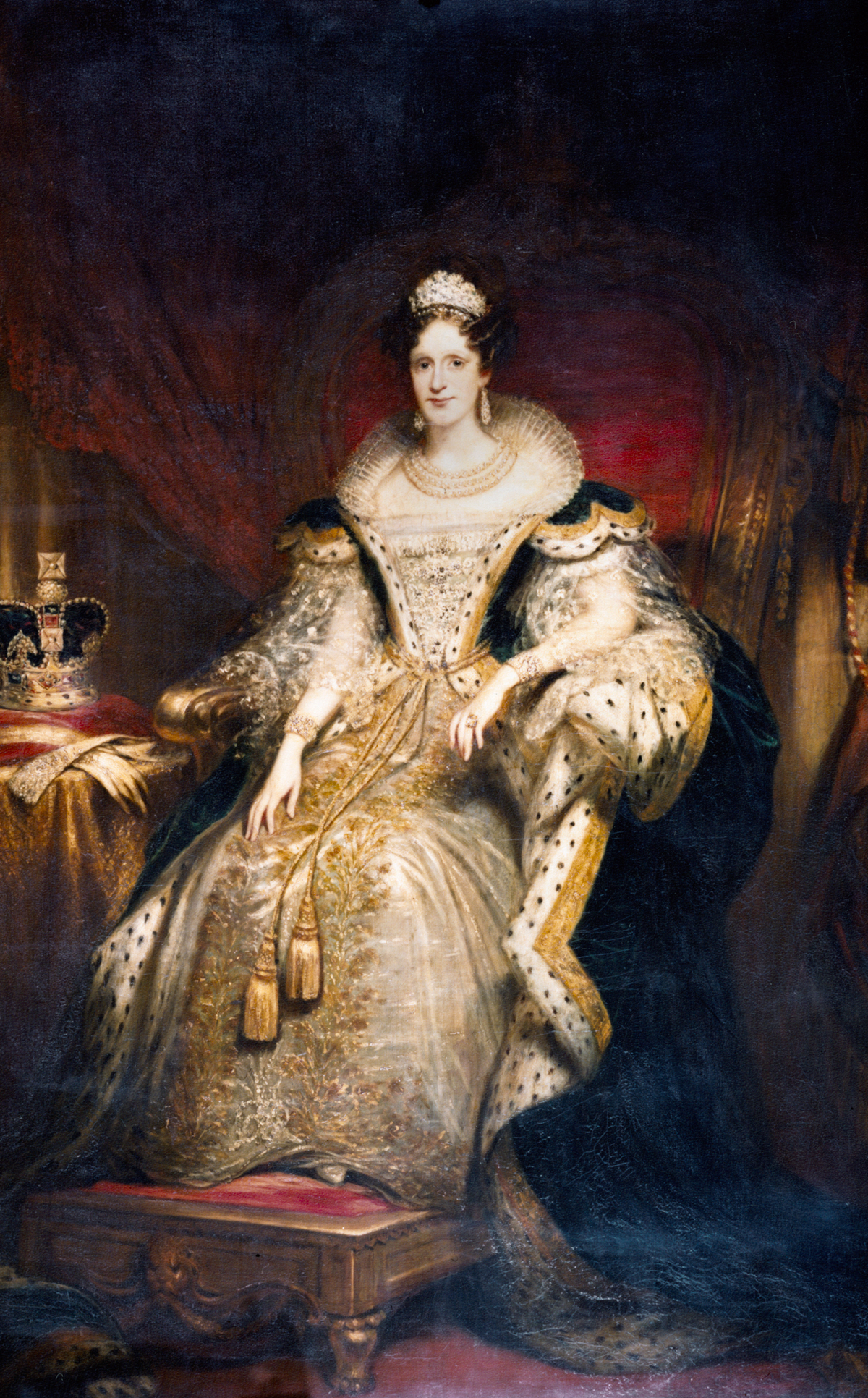
Portrait of Adelaide by William Beechey; Parliamentary Art Collection
