= Coronation portraits of George VI and Elizabeth =

Paintings by Gerald Kelly

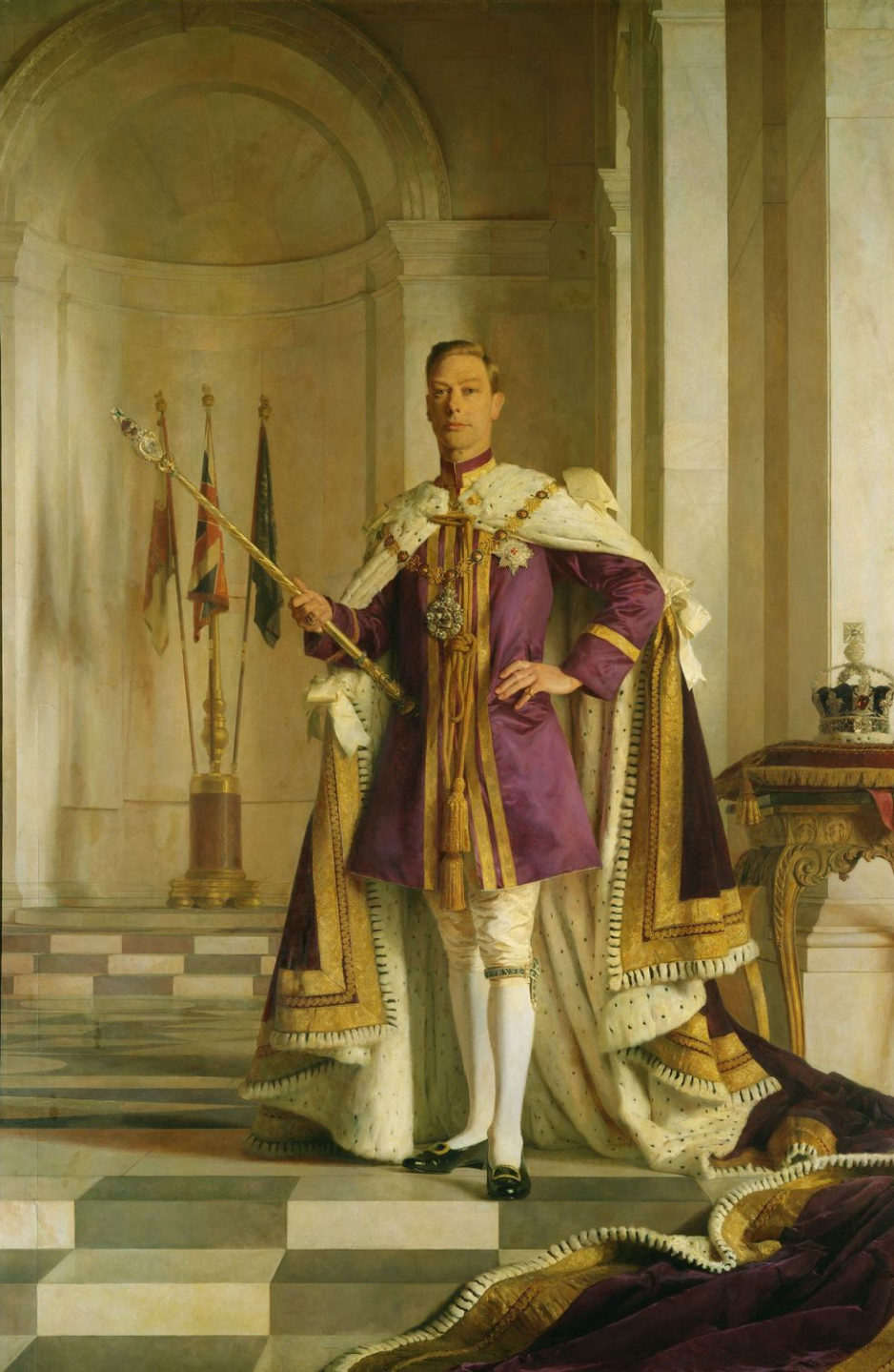
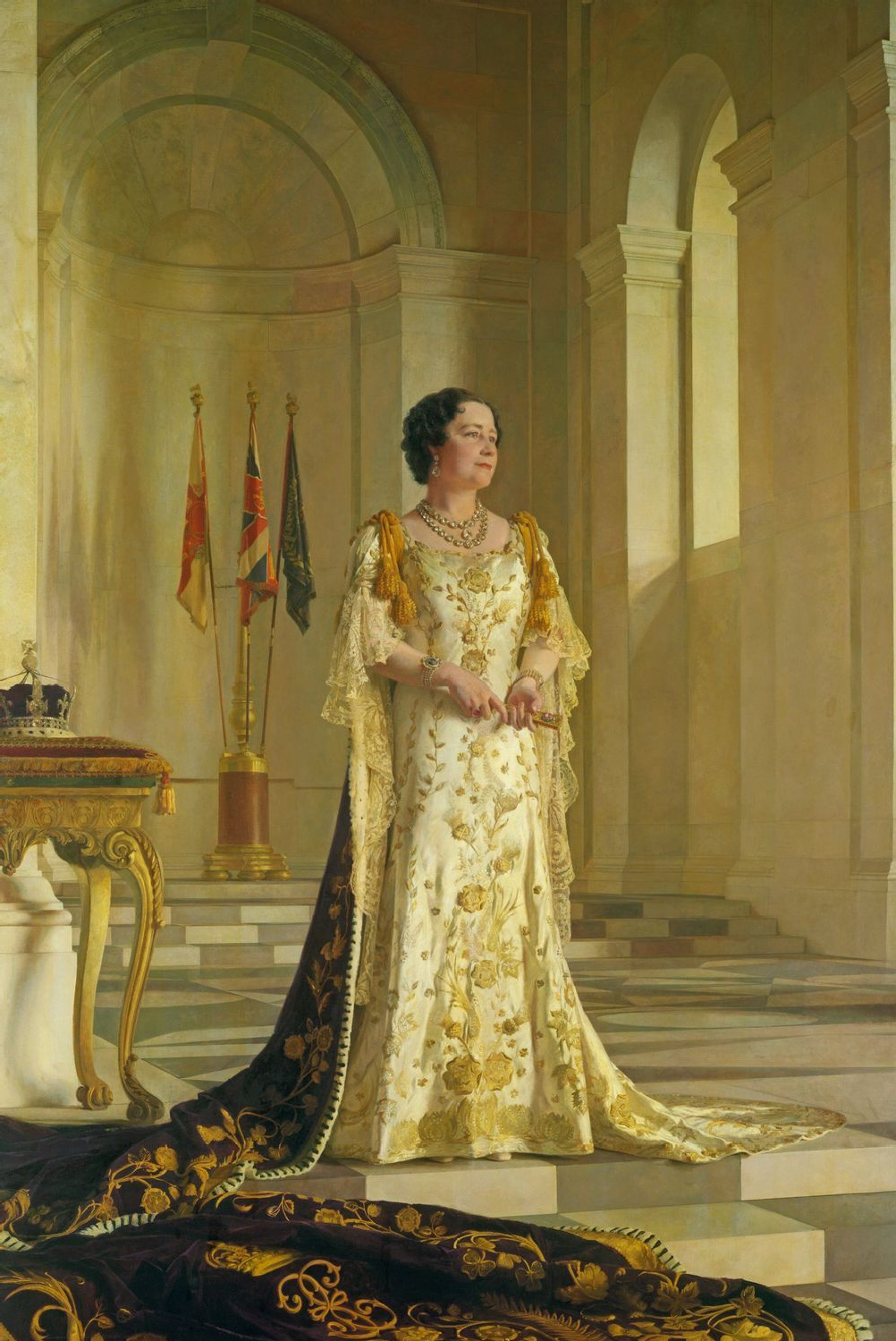
- Artist: Gerald Kelly
- Year: c. 1938–1945
- Medium: Oil on canvas
- Location: Crimson Drawing Room, Windsor Castle

Coronation portraits of the British monarch King George VI and his consort Queen Elizabeth are portrait paintings from 1938–1945 by the British artist Gerald Kelly depicting the King and Queen in their coronation robes. Their coronation had taken place on 12 May 1937 at Westminster Abbey. The new king had inherited the crown at the age of 40 following the abdication of his brother King Edward VIII in 1936.

Coronation portraits are usually large full-length paintings, which show the monarch in coronation robes surrounded by a crown, orb and sceptre. Sir Gerald Kelly was commissioned by George VI in 1938 and the portraits were mostly complete by the outbreak of the Second World War in 1939. As the war went on, the portraits were moved to Windsor Castle, where they were finished by 1945. The Crimson Drawing Room at Windsor Castle was the first choice as background for the portraits, but Kelly later used a model by Sir Edwin Lutyens which was based on the Viceroy's House in Delhi. The King is shown in his coronation robes with collar, star and garter of the Order of the Garter, while holding a sceptre in his right hand. The Imperial State Crown is depicted to his left. The Queen is shown wearing her coronation robes over her coronation gown. Her crown is depicted to her right. The portraits are located at the Crimson Drawing Room, Windsor Castle.

Kelly wrote of the painting process that he "had to try and solve the problem of persuading this modest man to strike a decorative pose." Preparatory oil studies that Kelly had produced during the painting process are kept at the National Portrait Gallery, London. In these studies the King wears the robes of the Order of the Garter while the Queen wears the order's sash and the Garter itself around her left arm. She wears an evening dress designed by Norman Hartnell that she had worn for a banquet at the British Embassy in France in 1938.
