= Coronation portraits of Charles III and Camilla =

Paintings by Peter Kuhfeld and Paul Benney

- Artist: Peter Kuhfeld (Charles III); Paul Benney (Camilla)
- Year: 2025
- Medium: Oil on canvas
- Dimensions: 226.4 cm × 155.8 cm (89.1 in × 61.3 in)
- Location: Throne Room, Buckingham Palace, London

Coronation portraits of the British monarch King Charles III and Queen Camilla are portrait paintings by British artists Peter Kuhfeld and Paul Benney, respectively, depicting the King and Queen in their coronation robes. Their coronation had taken place on 6 May 2023 at Westminster Abbey. The new king had inherited the crown from his mother Queen Elizabeth II in 2022 at the age of 73.

== Description and unveiling ==
Coronation portraits are usually large full-length paintings, which show the monarch in coronation robes surrounded by a crown, orb and sceptre. The King wears the ceremonial day dress (No. 1) of the Royal Navy, the collar of the Order of the Garter with the Sovereign’s Great George and the sash of the Royal Victorian Order underneath his red robe of state. The robe worn by the King was used during the first part of his coronation but he did not have the uniform of the Royal Navy on during the ceremony. This is in line with how some monarchs have chosen to be depicted in attires other than the ones worn during their coronation. On the table to his right is the Imperial State Crown, which he wore as he exited the abbey. Sittings for the portrait took place at St James' Palace and Kuhfeld had access to the crown itself twice. The portrait was completed over the course of one year and a half.

The Queen wears the coronation necklace, having been worn at all coronations since 1902 and her coronation gown, which was designed by Bruce Oldfield. Behind her is her purple robe of estate and Queen Camilla's Crown (which at the time was known as Queen Mary's Crown). Camilla had sittings with Benney in the Garden Room at Clarence House. It took Benney one year to complete the portrait.

The portraits were unveiled to the public on 6 May 2025, at the National Gallery in London, marking the second anniversary of the coronation. Both portraits were on display at the National Gallery from 6 May to 5 June before being permanently moved to the Throne Room at Buckingham Palace.
