= Coronation portraits of George III and Charlotte =

Paintings by Allan Ramsay

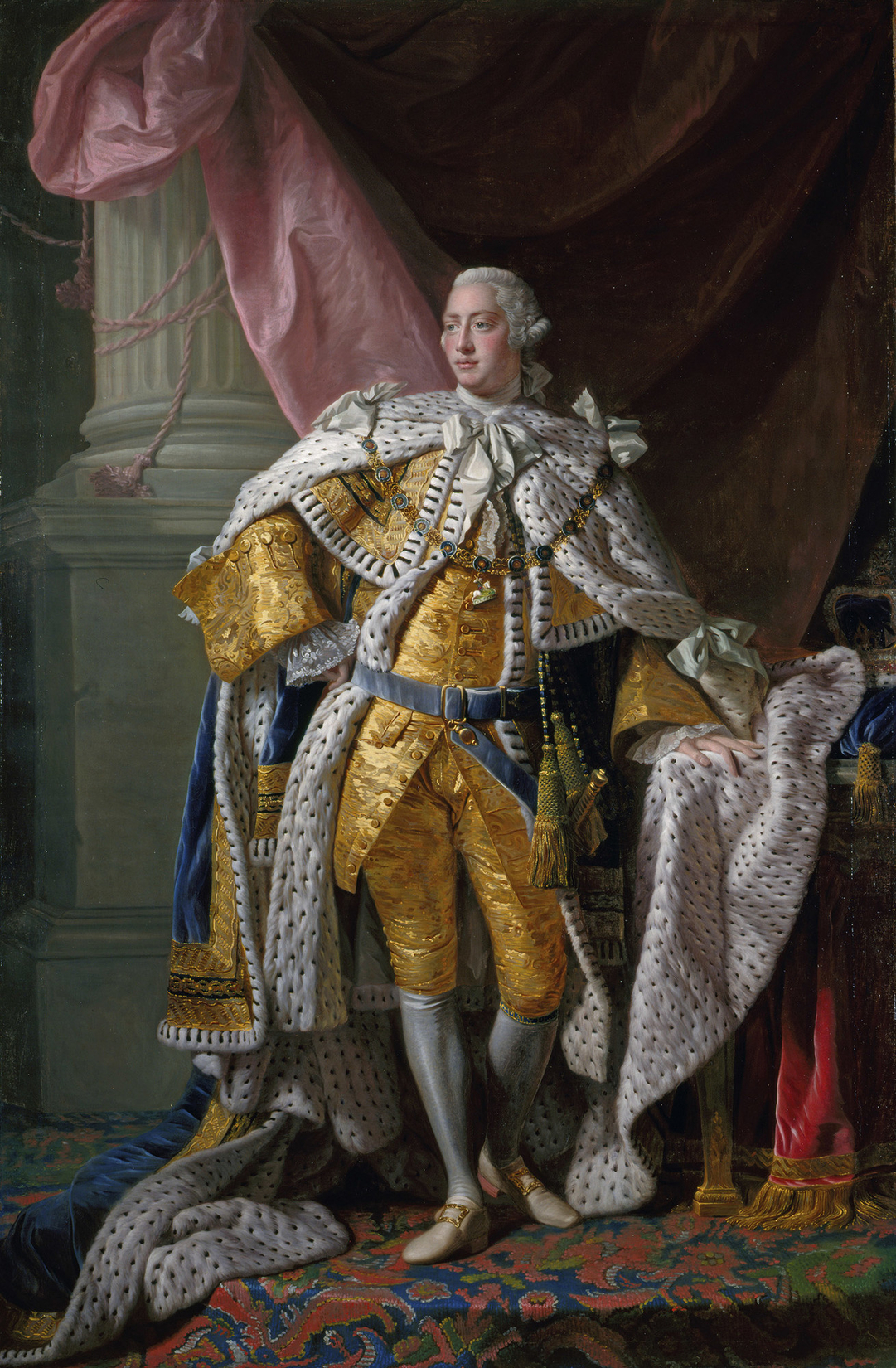
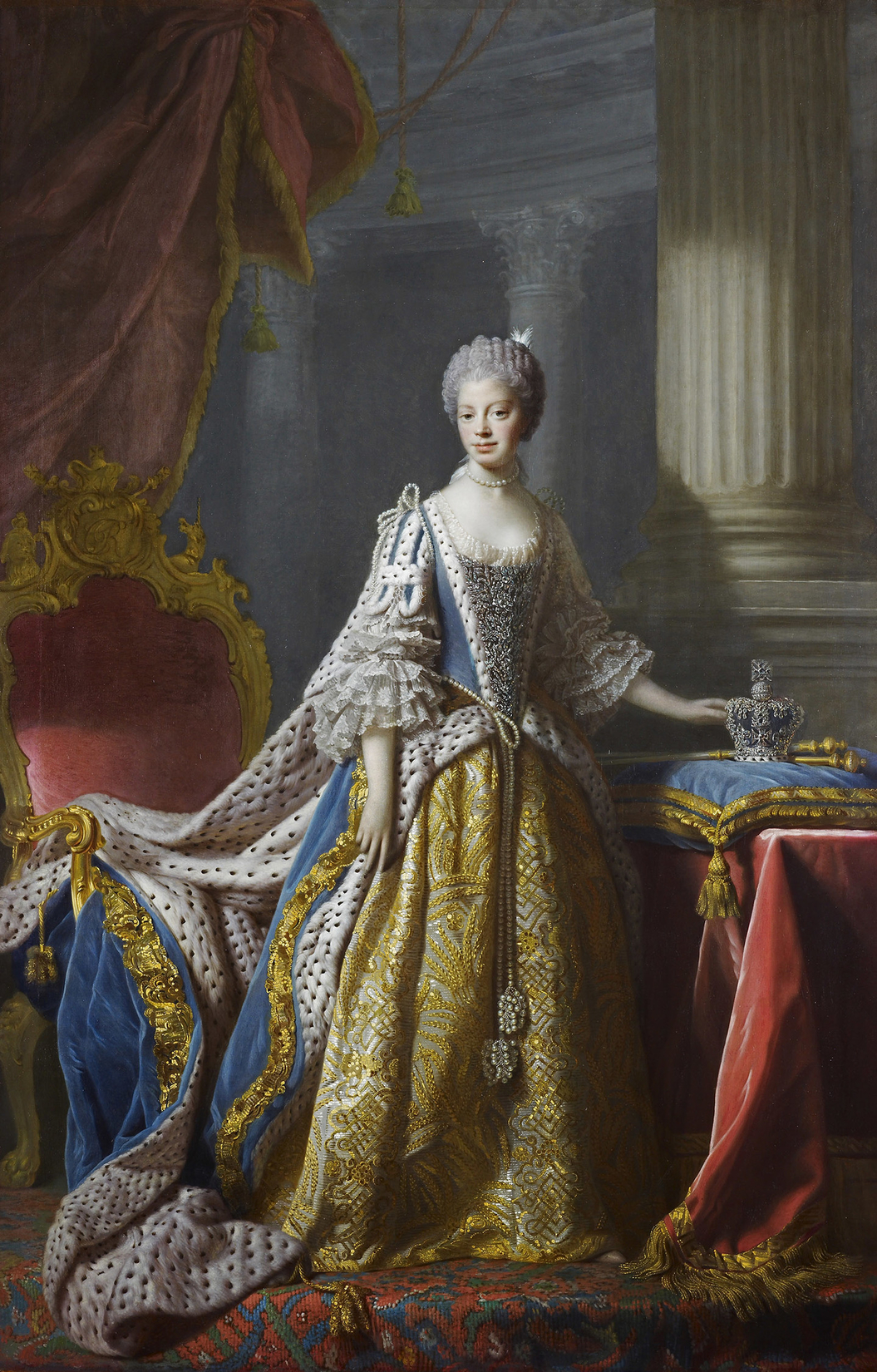
- Artist: Allan Ramsay
- Year: 1762
- Medium: Oil on canvas
- Location: Buckingham Palace; London

Coronation portraits of the British King George III and Queen Charlotte are portrait paintings of 1762 by the Scottish artist Allan Ramsay depicting the King and Queen in their coronation robes. Their coronation had taken place on 22 September 1761 at Westminster Abbey. The new king had inherited the crown from his grandfather George II in 1760 at the age of 22.

Ramsay was a notable portraitist and in 1761 was appointed Principal Painter in Ordinary to the monarch, a position he held until his death in 1784 when he was succeeded by Sir Joshua Reynolds. He was working on this portrait from December 1761 and had finished by March 1762. It is a popular image of George III, widely used in his lifetime and beyond. Today versions of it are in the Royal Collection, the National Portrait Gallery and the Art Gallery of South Australia. His depiction of the King was widely copied and featured in a number of works across the British Empire, including the American colonies. The original work is today in the Green Drawing Room of Buckingham Palace.

Ramsay also painted a similar work showing Queen Charlotte in her coronation robes. The principal version of the portrait is on display at Buckingham Palace, while versions of it are in the National Portrait Gallery and the Indianapolis Museum of Art. In 1997, Mario de Valdes y Cocom, a genealogist and self-described "independent researcher", seized on Charlotte's Allan Ramsay portrait as evidence of African ancestry, citing the Queen's "unmistakable African appearance" and "negroid physiogomy" [sic]. Valdes claimed that Charlotte had inherited these features from one of her distant ancestors, Madragana (born c. 1230), a mistress of King Afonso III of Portugal (c. 1210 – 1279). Although popular among the general public, the claims are rejected by most scholars.

== See also ==
- Portrait of George III, an 1809 portrait by Thomas Lawrence of the monarch dressed for the King's Speech

== Bibliography ==
- Black, Jeremy. George III: America's Last King. ISBN 0300136218. Yale University Press, 2008.
- Ingamells, John. National Portrait Gallery Mid-Georgian Portraits, 1760–1790. National Portrait Gallery, 2004.
