= Coronation portrait of Elizabeth II =

Painting by Herbert James Gunn

Queen Elizabeth II in Coronation Robes
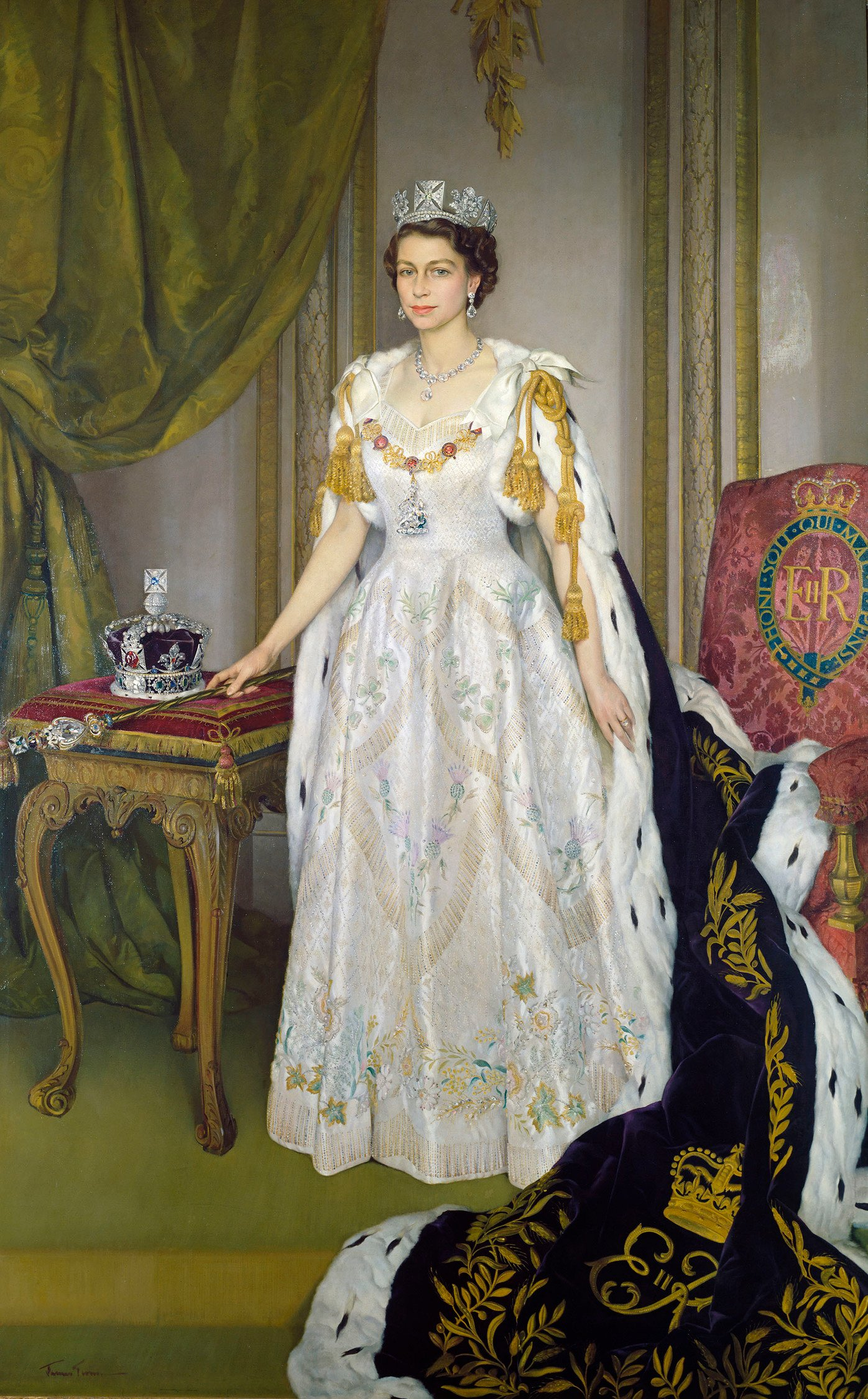
- Artist: Herbert James Gunn
- Year: c. 1953–54
- Medium: Oil on canvas
- Dimensions: 244.5 cm × 152.9 cm (96.3 in × 60.2 in)
- Location: Garter Throne Room, Windsor Castle

Queen Elizabeth II in Coronation Robes is a portrait painting from 1953–1954 by the Scottish artist Herbert James Gunn depicting Queen Elizabeth II in her coronation robes. Her coronation had taken place on 2 June 1953 at Westminster Abbey. The new queen had inherited the crown from her father King George VI in 1952 at the age of 25.

Coronation portraits are usually large full-length paintings, which show the monarch in coronation robes surrounded by a crown, orb and sceptre. Gunn was commissioned by Elizabeth, who depicted her wearing the George IV State Diadem, the purple Robe of Estate over her coronation gown, Queen Victoria's collet diamond necklace and diamond drop earrings, and the collar and badge of the Order of the Garter. She holds a sceptre in her right that rests on a table together with the Imperial State Crown. The Throne Room at Buckingham Palace was chosen as the background for the painting. The principal version of the portrait is located in the Garter Throne Room at Windsor Castle, while replicas are found elsewhere including within the Parliamentary Art Collection.

== Gallery ==
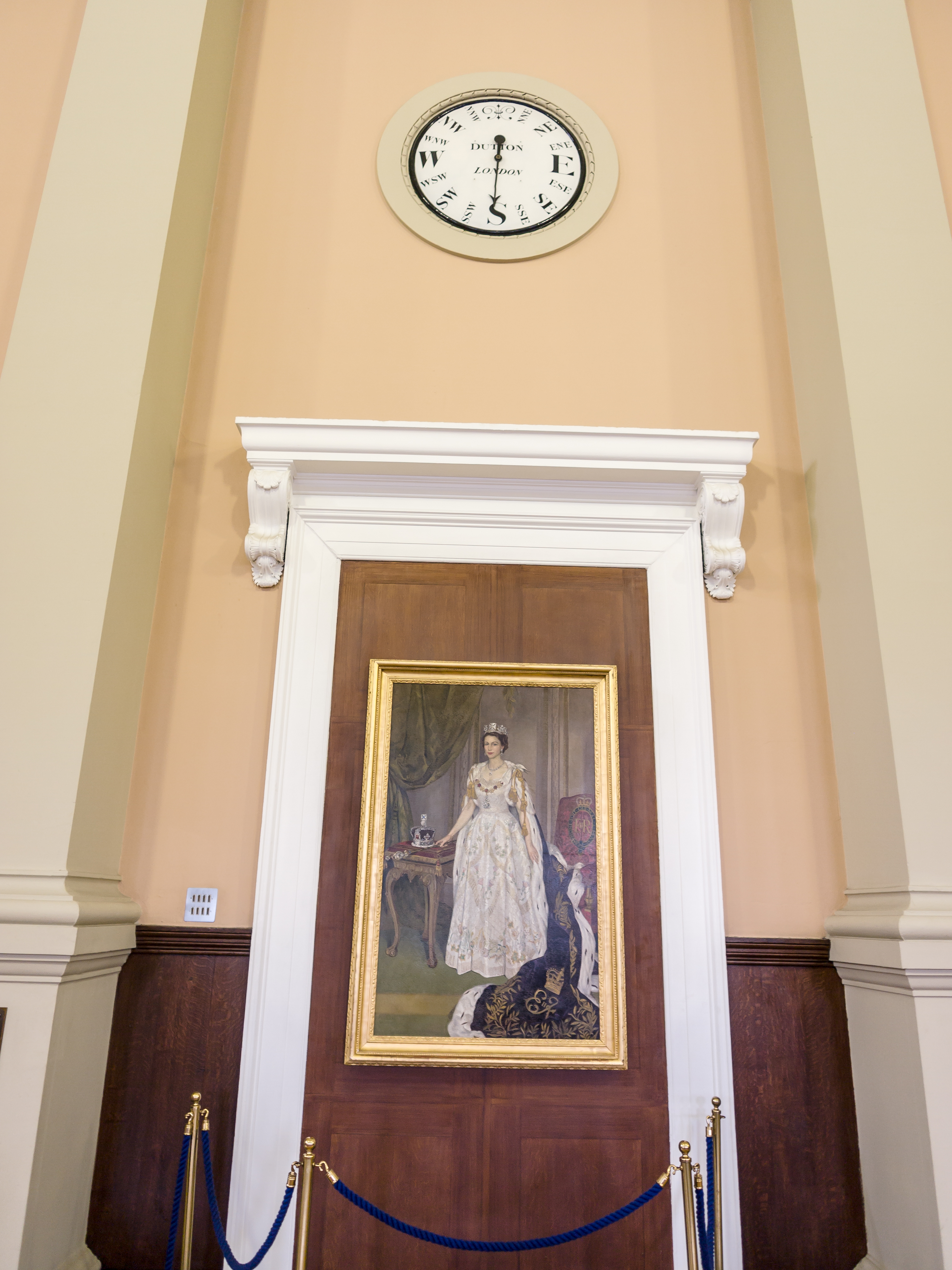
Custom House, City of London, United Kingdom (2013)

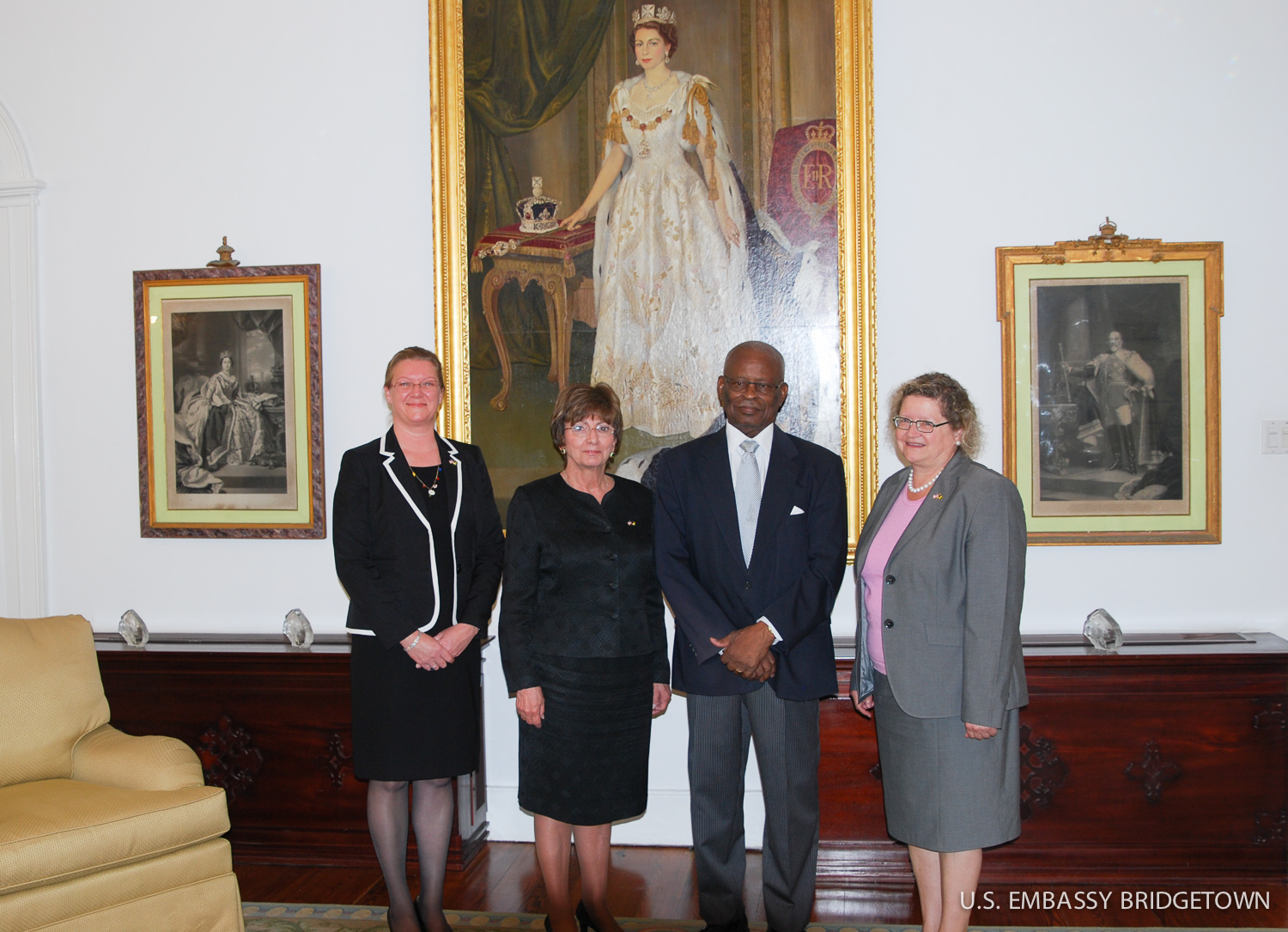
Government House, Bridgetown, Barbados (2016)

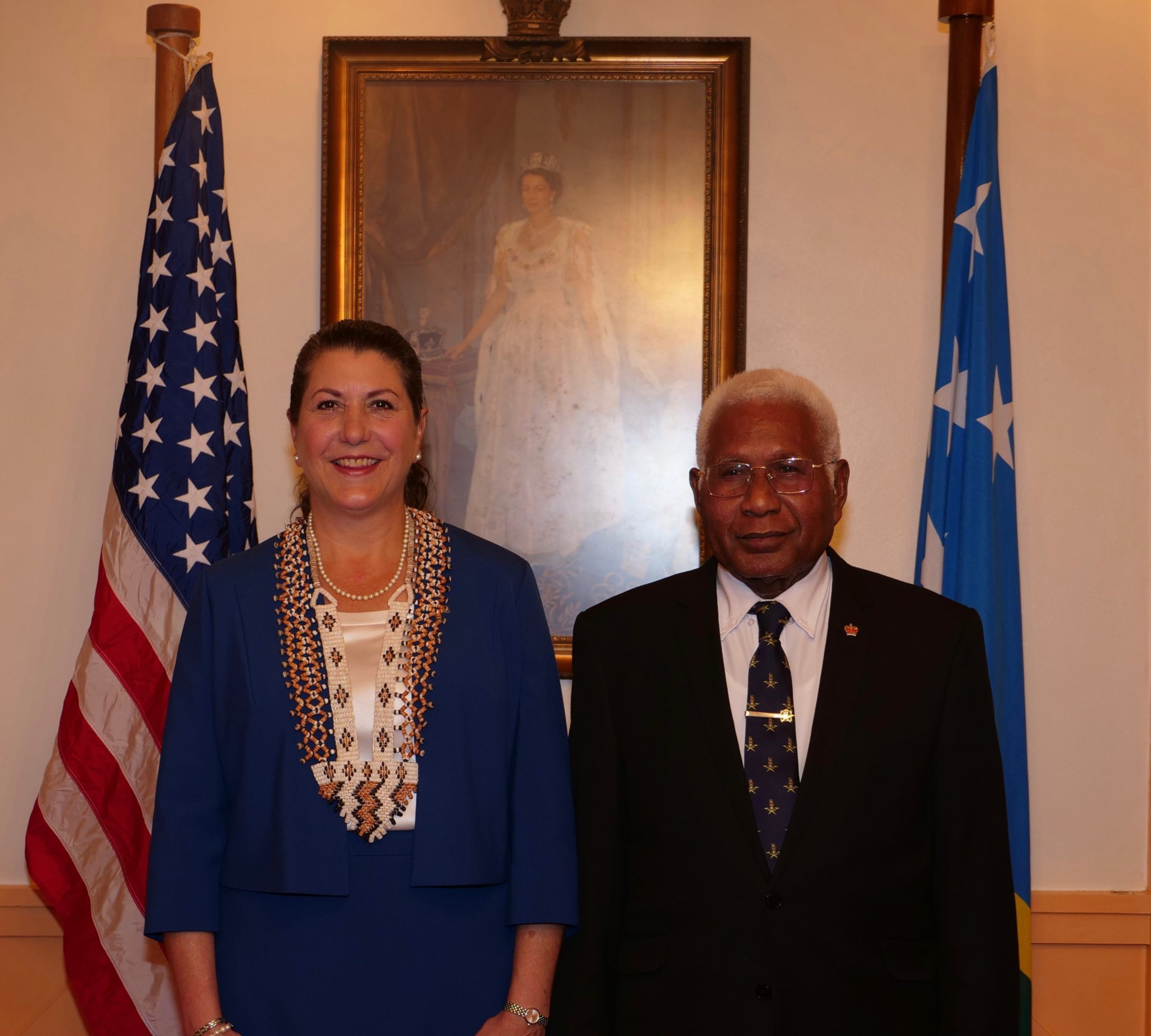
Government House, Honiara, Solomon Islands (2020)

Belize House, Belmopan, Belize (2022)

== External videos ==
- Royal Collection: Queen Elizabeth II in Coronation Robes, Sir Herbert James Gunn
- What can you see hidden in James Gunn's portrait of Her Majesty The Queen?
