= Coronation portraits of Edward VII and Alexandra =

Paintings by Luke Fildes

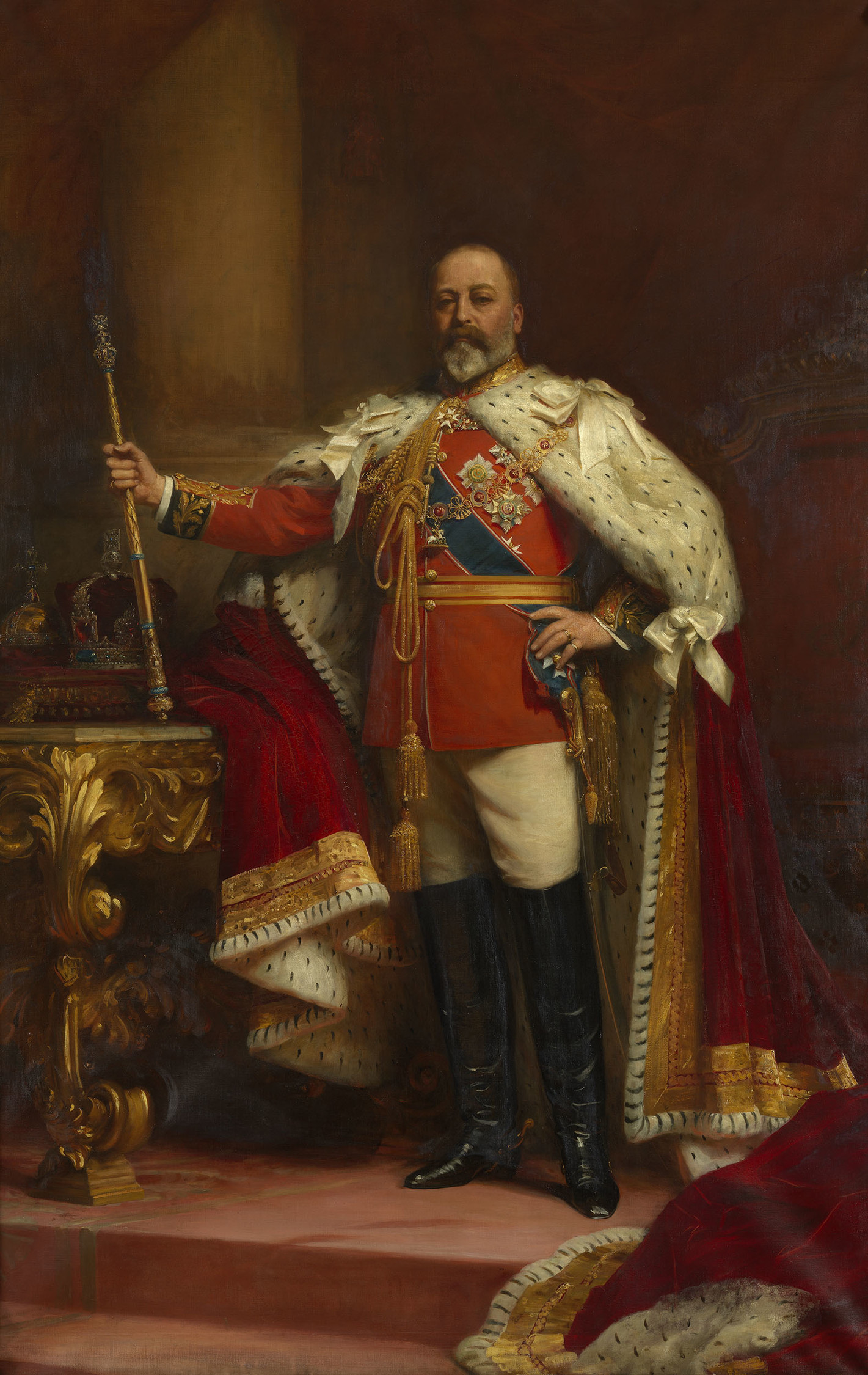
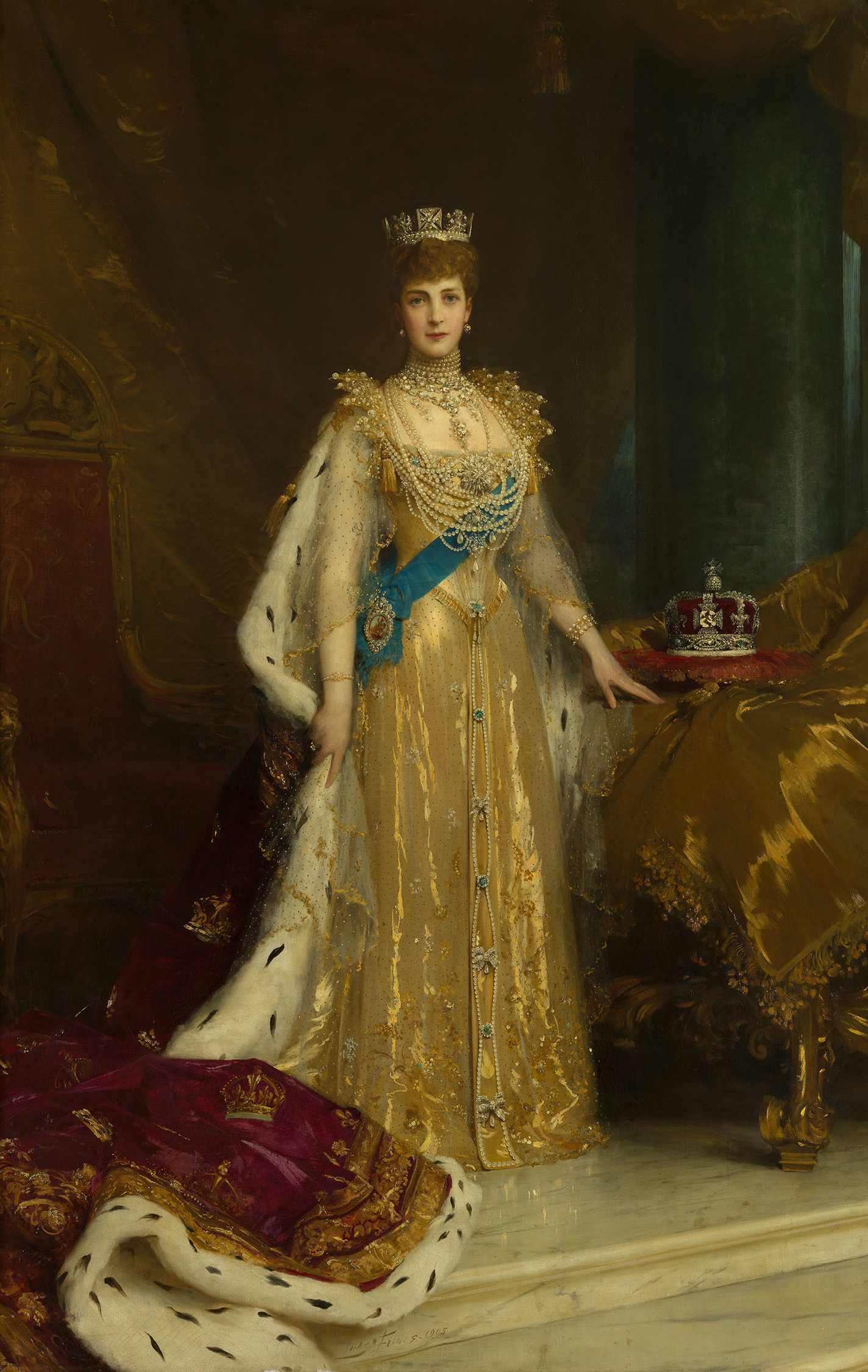
- Artist: Luke Fildes
- Year: 1902 (Edward VII); 1905 (Alexandra)
- Medium: Oil on canvas
- Location: The King's Gallery, Buckingham Palace, London

Coronation portraits of the British monarch King Edward VII and his consort Queen Alexandra are portrait paintings from the 1900s by the British artist Luke Fildes depicting the King and Queen in their coronation robes. Their coronation had taken place on 9 August 1902 at Westminster Abbey. The new king had inherited the crown from his mother Queen Victoria in 1901 at the age of 59.

Coronation portraits are usually large full-length paintings, which show the monarch in coronation robes surrounded by a crown, orb and sceptre. After seeking the advice of Sir Edward Poynter, Sir Luke Fildes was commissioned by Edward VII in 1901 to paint his state portrait. Fildes drew inspiration from the coronation portrait of George IV by Sir Thomas Lawrence. The King sat for the portrait at Fildes's studio at Melbury Road, although during the process he sat on an armchair on a dais and never assumed the posture depicted in the portrait. Queen Alexandra expressed her approval of the painting and noted the King's drooping eyelids, stating: "I like it very much. I think it is very good. I know that expression so well. It is just like him when he begins to feel drowsy." The principal version of the portrait hangs at The King's Gallery, Buckingham Palace, although the Royal Collection possesses several more copies. Replicas are at the National Portrait Gallery, St Bartholomew's Hospital Museum and Archive, Freemasons' Hall, and within the Government Art Collection and Parliamentary Art Collection. In the portrait, Edward is wearing parliamentary robes over his field marshal uniform that is adorned with the sash and badge of the Royal Victorian Order and the star of the Order of the Garter, while holding a sceptre in his right hand. The Imperial State Crown and the Sovereign's Orb are depicted to his right. Following his death, a posthumous version of the portrait was commissioned by Alexandra and completed in 1912, which she wanted to be "more intimate in character."

The Queen herself was not keen on sitting for a coronation portrait, but after encouragements by Sir Arthur Ellis and looking at sketches produced by Fildes, she agreed to sit for the portrait at Buckingham Palace. Painting began in 1903 but did not finish until 1905 as the Queen's robes and accessories were not sent to Fildes' studio and Alexandra herself considered having a portrait showing her in profile. Upon completion, it was first displayed at the Royal Academy of Arts in 1905 before being taken to Buckingham Palace in 1907. Alexandra is shown wearing the George IV State Diadem, her coronation robes over her gold coronation gown, and ropes of pearls and diamonds around her neck. Her crown is depicted to her left. Replicas of the portrait are within the Government Art Collection and the Parliamentary Art Collection.
