= William Llewellyn (painter) =

English painter (1858–1941)

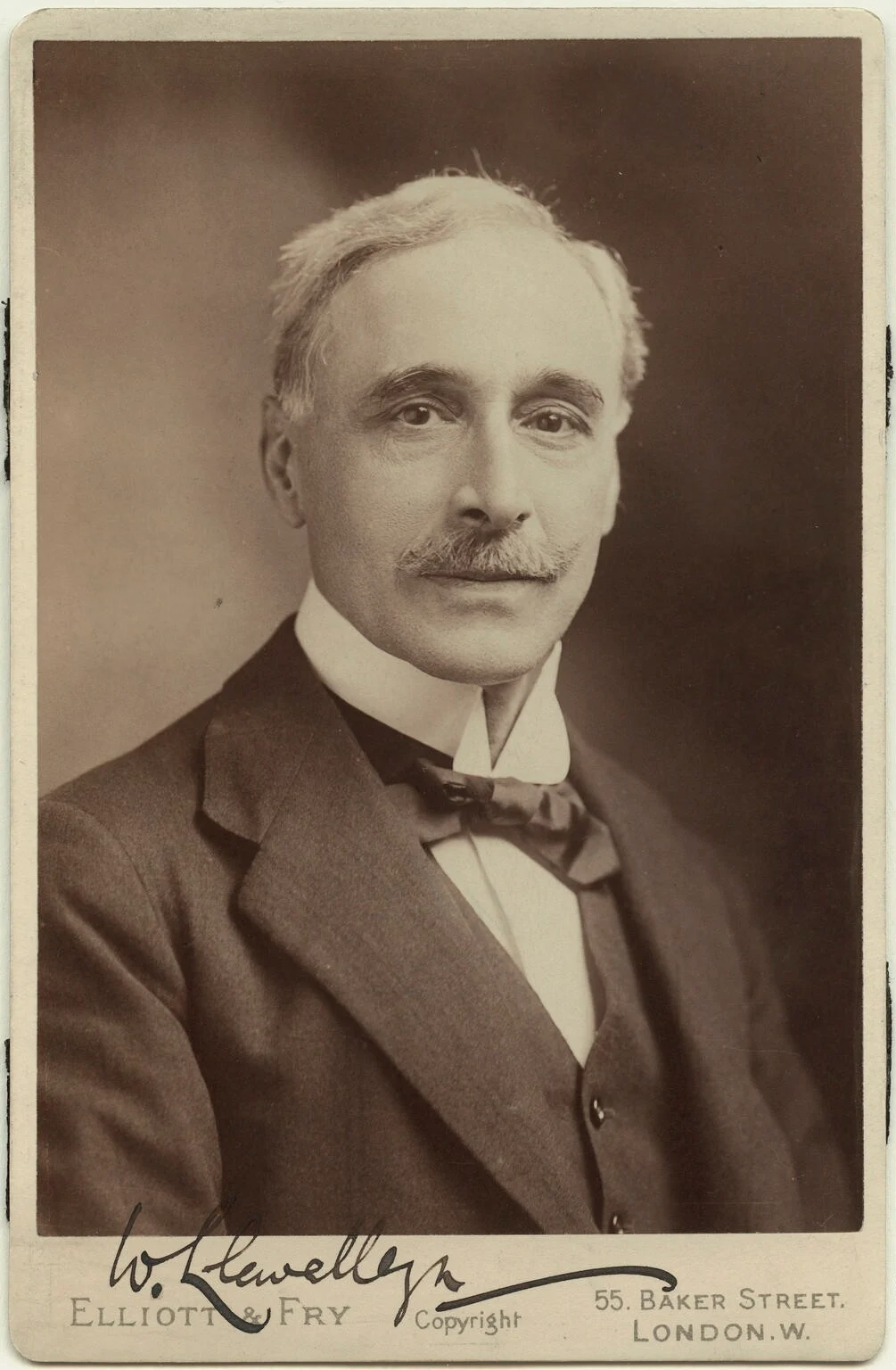
Llewellyn, 1910s–20s

Sir Samuel Henry William Llewellyn GCVO PRA RBA RI (1 December 1858 – 28 January 1941) was a Welsh painter of the late 19th and early 20th centuries who served as President of the Royal Academy from 1928 to 1938. He was awarded the Albert Medal by the Royal Society of Arts in 1933.

Llewellyn was born in Cirencester, Gloucestershire, in 1858. He was the son of English-born Welsh parents: Samuel Llewellyn, an engineer, and Alice Jennings. He married Marion Meates, daughter of T. M. Meates.

He has 67 paintings in British national collections, including a portrait of industrialist and philanthropist Sir Alexander Grant held by the University of Edinburgh.

In 1918, Llewellyn was invested as a Knight Commander of the Royal Victorian Order (KCVO) and advanced to Knight Grand Cross in 1931. He was a trustee of the National Gallery, a member of the Royal West of England Academy, an honorary member of the Royal Cambrian, Scottish, and Hibernian Academies, and corresponding member of the National Academy of Design, New York. His foreign honours included that of Grand Officer of the Order of Orange-Nassau in the Netherlands.

Llewellyn died in 1941, aged 82. His funeral was held at Westminster Abbey. A memorial by Sir Edwin Lutyens, who succeeded him as president of the Royal Academy, was erected in his honour in the crypt of St Paul's Cathedral in 1942.

== Gallery ==
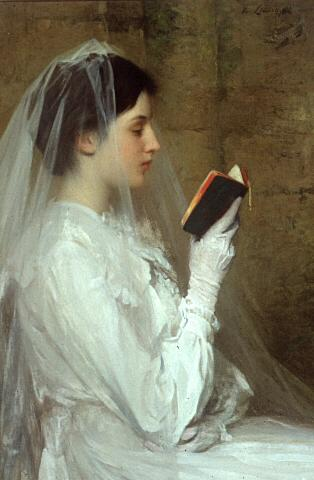
Confirmation, 1907

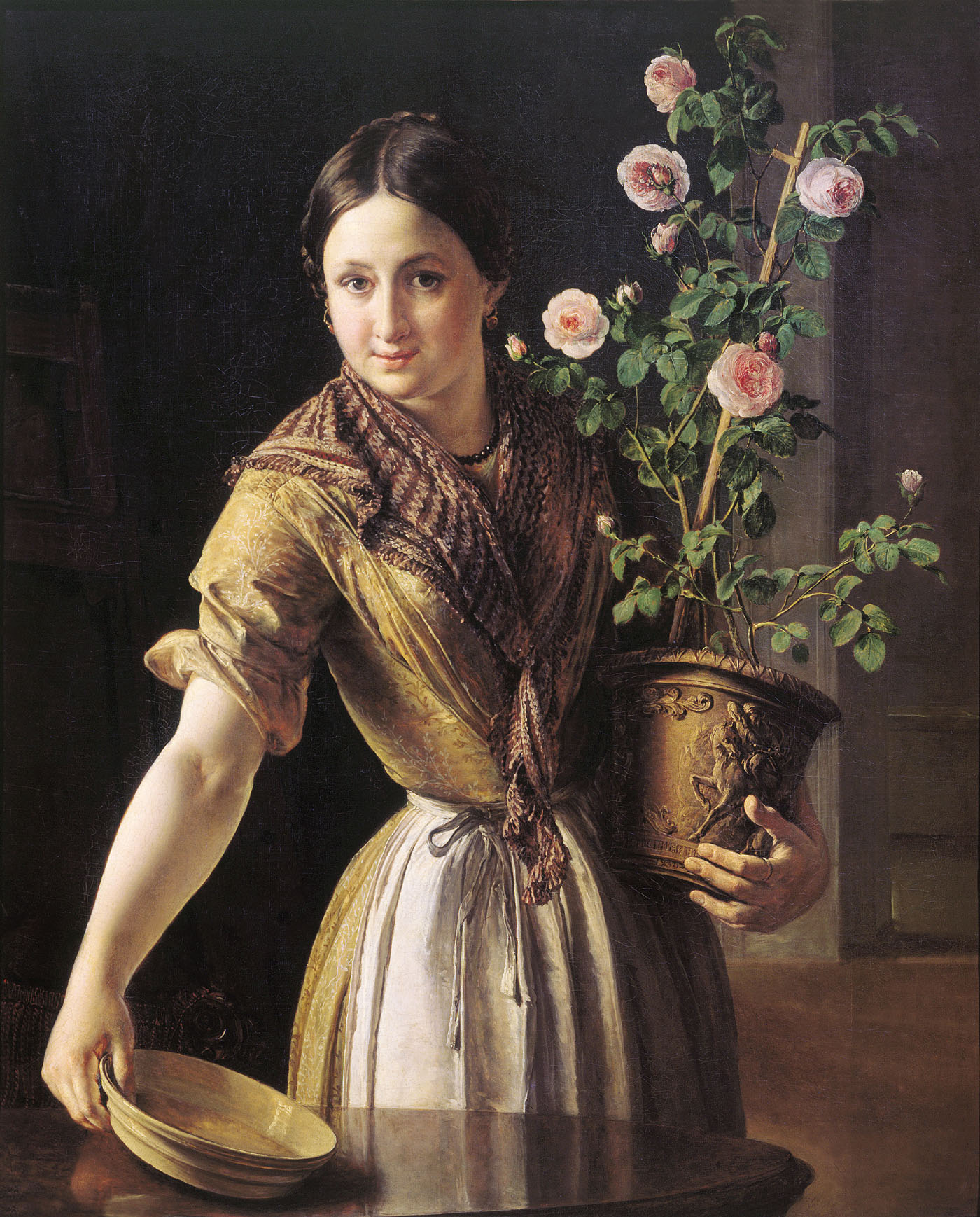
Le Rosier, c. 1910

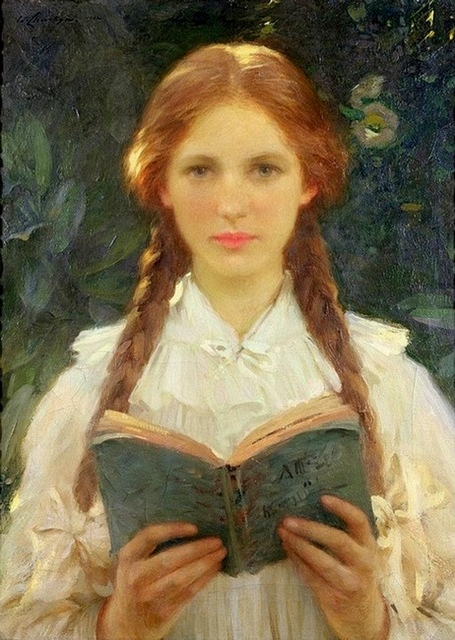
Girl with Pigtails, c. 1910

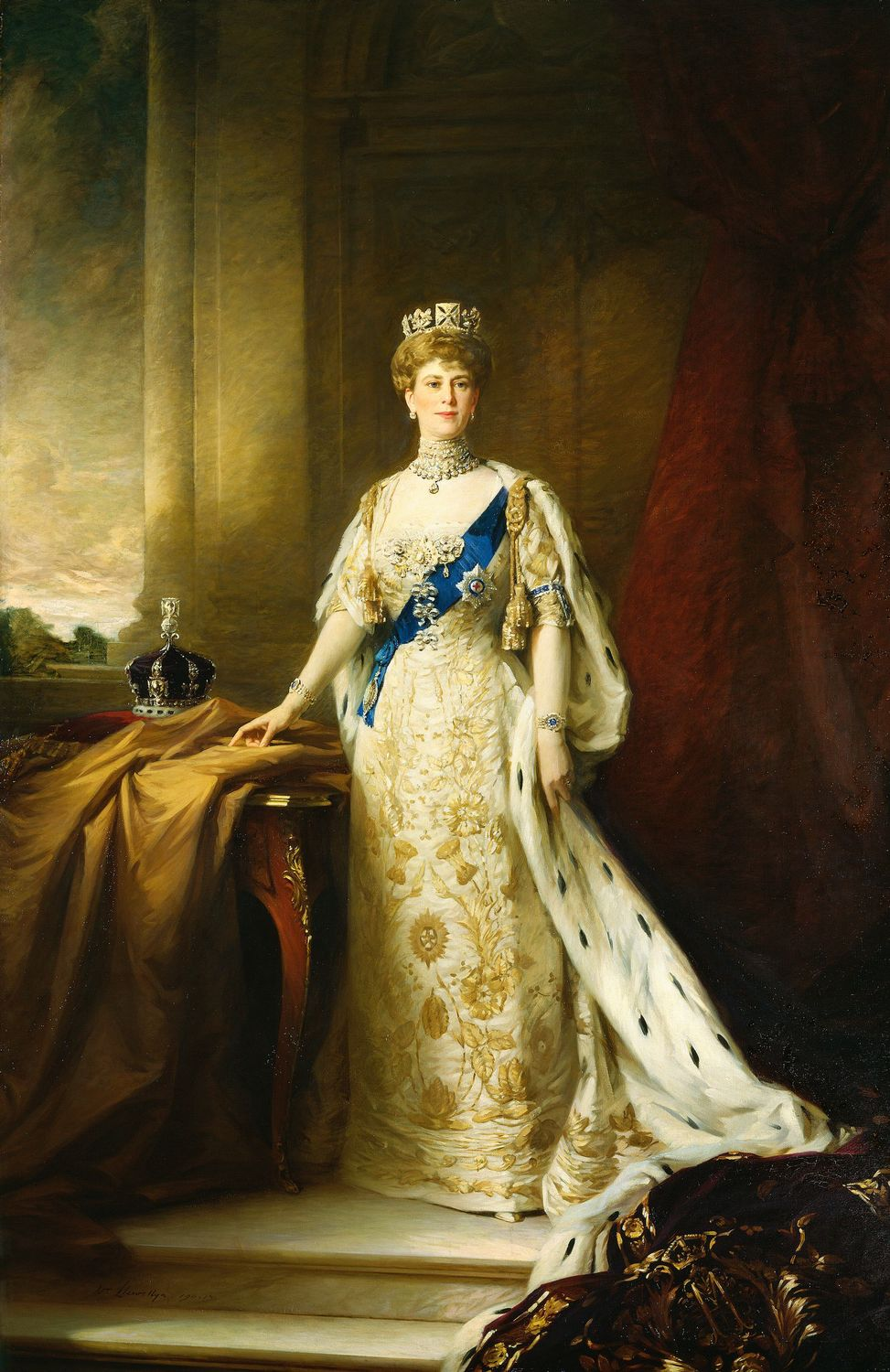
Queen Mary (1867-1953), 1912

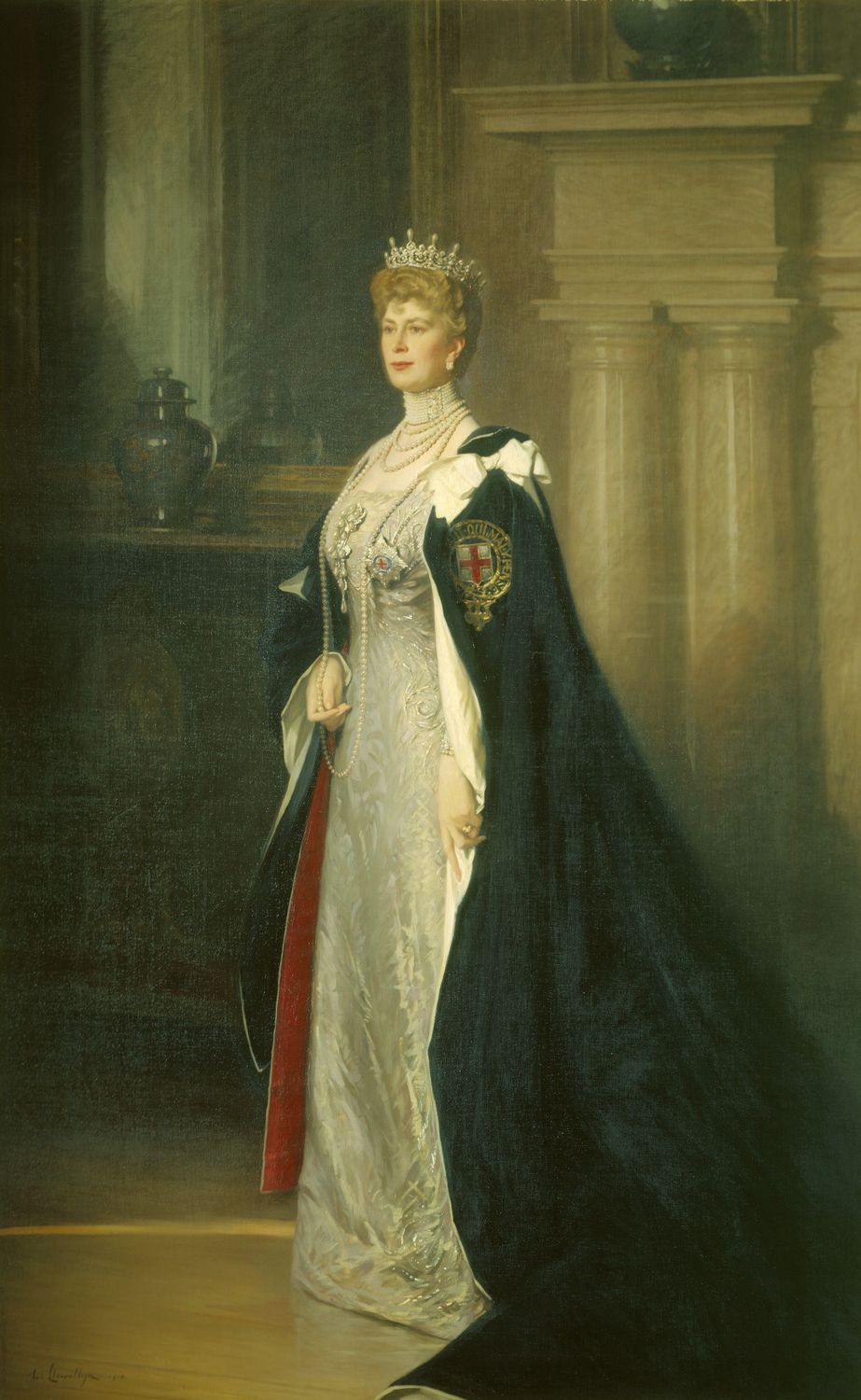
Queen Mary in Garter Ceremonial Robes, 1914

Cultural offices
Preceded by Sir Frank Dicksee	President of the Royal Academy; 1928–1938	Succeeded by Sir Edwin Lutyens
