= Fildes (surname) =

Fildes is an English toponymic surname from the regional name Fylde, the western part of the area Amounderness Hundred in Lancashire, England. The final -s appears to be a post-medieval excrescence. Notable people with the surname include:

- Albert Fildes, British rugby league footballer
- Audrey Fildes (1922–1997), British actress
- Henry Fildes (1870–1948), British politician
- Horace Edward Manners Fildes (1875–1937), New Zealand book collector
- John Fildes (1811–1875), British businessman and politician
- Luke Fildes (1843–1927), British painter
- Luke Fildes (fencer) (1879–1970), British fencer
- Mary Fildes (1789–1876), British activist
- Paul Fildes (1882–1971), British pathologist and microbiologist
- Robin Fildes (born 1940), Australian rules footballer
