= Simpletons (painting) =

Painting by Luke Fildes

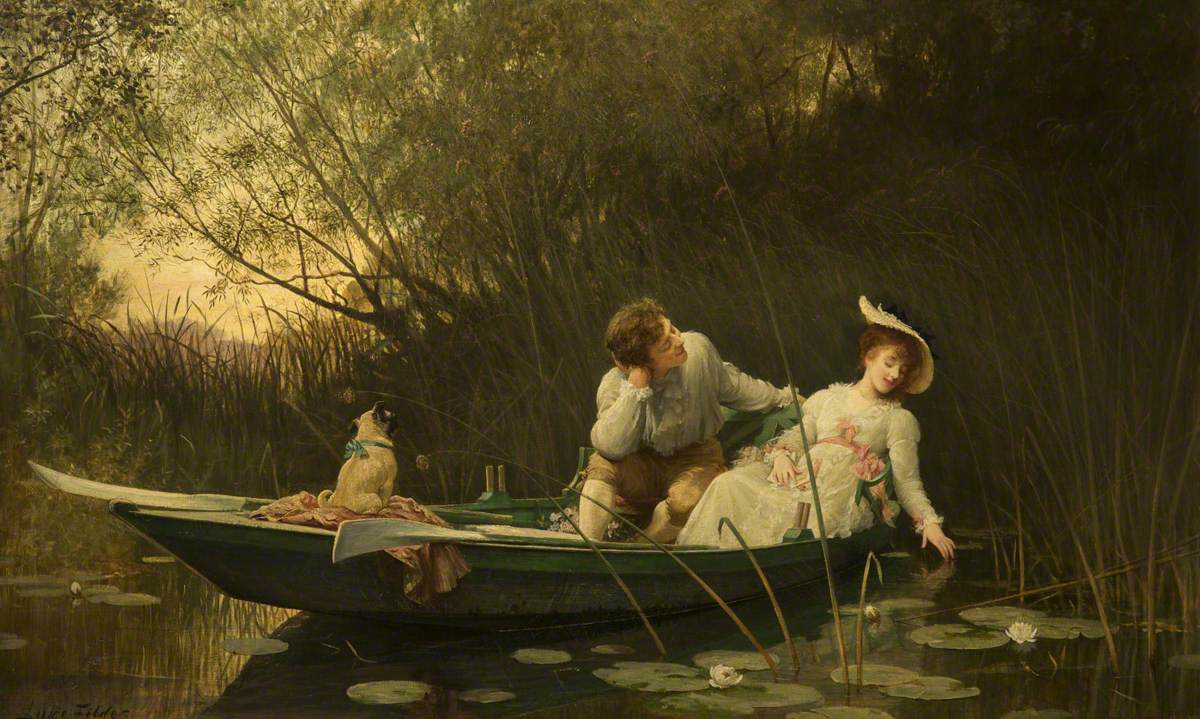
- Artist: Luke Fildes
- Year: 1873
- Type: Oil on canvas, genre painting
- Dimensions: 78 cm × 127 cm (31 in × 50 in)
- Location: Museum of Wigan Life, Greater Manchester

Simpletons is an oil painting on canvas by the British artist Luke Fildes, from 1873. The painting is also known by the alternative title The Sweet River.

== History and description ==
It presents a courting young couple on a rowing boat in the River Thames accompanied by a dog. The title was suggested by Kate Perugini, the daughter of Charles Dickens.

It was intended as a follow-up to his success, Fair Quiet and Sweet Rest, the previous year, which depicted a similar idyllic scene on the Thames. The success of both paintings allowed him to focus on less commercial Realist scenes of ordinary life such as Applicants for Admission to a Casual Ward. The picture was displayed at the Royal Academy Exhibition of 1873 held at Burlington House in London. Two notable versions of the painting exist; one was auctioned by Christie's in 2016 while the other has been in the collection of the Museum of Wigan Life since 1955.

== Bibliography ==
- Dakers, Caroline. The Holland Park Circle: Artists and Victorian Society. Yale University Press, 1999.
- Fildes, L.V. Luke Fildes, R.A.: A Victorian Painter. Joseph, 1968.
- Morris, Edward. Public Art Collections in North-west England: A History and Guide. Liverpool University Press, 2001.
- Ward, Chloe. Art and Action: Painting for Social Change in Victorian England. Oxford University Press, 2026.
