= Fair Quiet and Sweet Rest =

Painting by Luke Fildes

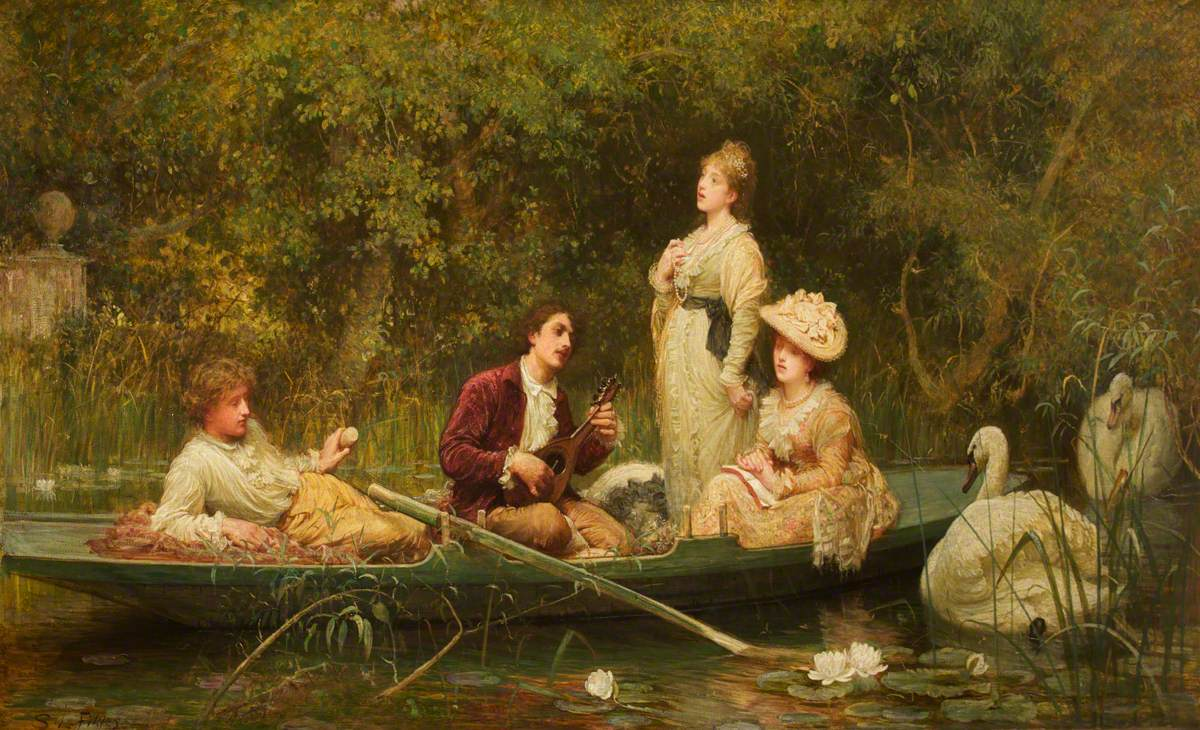
- Artist: Luke Fildes
- Year: 1872
- Type: Oil on canvas, genre painting
- Dimensions: 122 cm × 213 cm (48 in × 84 in)
- Location: Museum and Art Gallery, Warrington

Fair Quiet and Sweet Rest is an oil painting on canvas by the British artist Luke Fildes, from 1872.

== History and description ==
It depicts a carefree summer Idyll. It was inspired by a boat trip and picnic that Fildes had taken on the River Thames several years earlier with his close friend Henry Woods and his two sisters Fanny and Annie, the latter of whom married Fildes in 1874. It has been described as Watteauesque in style.

This painting was displayed at the Royal Academy Exhibition of 1872 held at Burlington House, in London, his debut at the annual exhibitions, where it was widely praised. Today the picture is in the Warrington Museum and Art Gallery, in Cheshire, which purchased it in 1911.

His follow-up in similar style, Simpletons, at the 1873 exhibition, was less well-received. Fildes ultimately became best known for realist paintings or ordinary life and his portraiture.

== Bibliography ==
- Dakers, Caroline. The Holland Park Circle: Artists and Victorian Society. Yale University Pressz 1999.
- Fildes, L.V. Luke Fildes, R.A.: A Victorian Painter. Joseph, 1968.
- Korda, Andrea. Printing and Painting the News in Victorian London: The Graphic and Social Realism, 1869-1891. Taylor & Francis, 2017.
