= Fyles =

Fyles is an English toponymic surname, a variant of Fildes from the regional name Fylde, the western part of the area Amounderness Hundred in Lancashire, England. Notable people with the surname include:

- Faith Fyles (1875–1961), Canadian botanist and illustrator
- Natasha Fyles (born 1978), Australian politician

== See also ==
- Fyles Ongori
