= Female Political Union of the Working Classes =

The Female Political Union of the Working Classes was established in 1833 by Mary Fildes and Mrs Broadhurst.

The organisation sprang from the wider labour movements of the early 19th century, influenced by Chartism and campaigns for women's enfranchisement. Fildes, who had been present at the Peterloo Massacre, had previously been president of the Manchester-based Society of Female Reformers (itself a response to Blackburn Female Reform Society).

Little is currently known of the workings of many of these societies, but they are evidence of a highly organised and committed group of working class activist women, at a time when culturally such participation was socially discouraged. Katrina Navickas writes about groups like those set up by Fildes that 'Northern working-class women challenged the middle-class notion of separate spheres not simply by entering the political public sphere, but conversely by asserting domestic concerns as public and political.'
