= Paul Fildes =

British pathologist and microbiologist (1882–1971)

Sir Paul Fildes OBE FRS
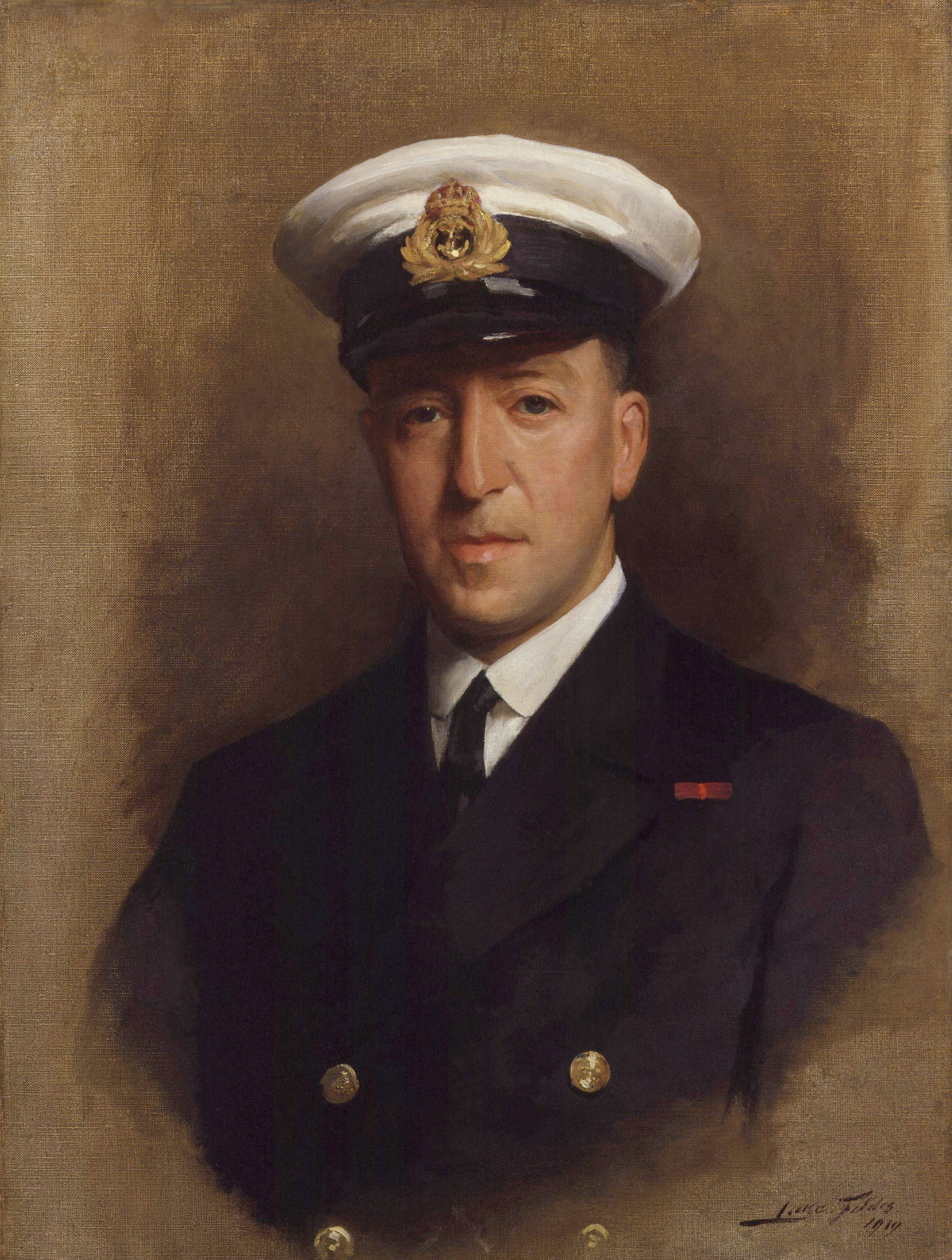
- Paul Fildes, as painted by his father, Luke Fildes in 1919
- Born: Paul Gordon Fildes; 10 February 1882
- Died: 5 February 1971 (aged 88)
- Education: Trinity College, Cambridge
- Awards: Fellow of the Royal Society; Royal Medal (1953); Copley Medal (1963)
- Scientific career
- Workplaces: University of Cambridge

Sir Paul Gordon Fildes OBE FRS (10 February 1882 – 5 February 1971) was a British pathologist and microbiologist who worked on the development of chemical-biological weaponry at Porton Down during the Second World War.

== Biography ==
=== Early life ===
Fildes was born in Kensington, London, the son of the artist Sir Luke Fildes and great grandson of reformist Mary Fildes, Paul attended Winchester School and then studied surgery at Trinity College, Cambridge, where he obtained an MB BCh degree.

=== Career ===
Fildes served as a lieutenant-commander in the Royal Naval Volunteer Reserve, stationed at the Royal Naval Hospital Haslar (1915–19) during the First World War. In 1919 he was made an Officer of the Order of the British Empire.

After working at the London Hospital as an assistant bacteriologist, he moved in 1934 to work at the Middlesex Hospital. He was also elected a Fellow of the Royal Society in 1934. In 1940 he helped Donald D. Woods discover how sulphonamides worked.

He was a member of the scientific staff, Medical Research Council (1934–49).

=== World War II ===
Fildes asserted that he assisted with Operation Anthropoid the assassination of top Nazi Reinhard Heydrich in Prague by providing the Czech agents of the Special Operations Executive with modified No. 73 Grenades filled with botulin toxin. The story has been met with scepticism, given the absence of any indication that Heydrich displayed any of the highly distinctive symptoms of botulism.

In 1940 Fildes was put in charge of a newly created department, the Biology Department, Porton (BDP) at Porton Down to study the defensive implications of a bacterial attack and there built up a team of microbiologists to study the use of biological weapons, including anthrax and botulinum toxin. An early project was the creation of a stockpile of a million anthrax impregnated cattle cakes to be used in a possible retaliatory attack. In 1942 it famously carried out tests of an anthrax bio-weapon developed at Porton Down at Gruinard Island. He also assisted with the anthrax strain tests on Gruinard Island, performing necropsies on the bodies of anthrax-exposed sheep, to determine if they had died as a direct result of anthrax poisoning. This work produced the world's first working anthrax bomb in the summer of 1942.

At the end of the war he returned to university life and handed over control of the department to his deputy David Henderson, who oversaw the building of a new purpose designed laboratory facility and the creation of the autonomous Microbiological Research Department. He was knighted in the 1946 New Year Honours.

=== Later years ===
After the war Fildes worked at the Sir William Dunn School of Pathology in Oxford, headed by Nobel Prize winner Sir Howard Florey, to study on the biochemistry of bacteriophage T1 (and to a lesser extent, T2) multiplication.

Fildes received the Copley Medal in 1963 from the Royal Society.

== Works ==
He was the author of works on haemophilia and syphilis.
