= Manchester Female Reform Society =

Manchester Female Reform Society was formed in July 1819. Based in Manchester, England, its aim was to spread democratic ideals among women.

The Blackburn Female Reform Society was established in early July 1819 and sent a circular to other districts of Lancashire, inviting the wives and daughters of the workmen in the different branches of manufacturing to form themselves into similar societies. On 20 July 1819, numerous women of Manchester formed themselves into a Society of Female Reformers. The secretary was Susanna Saxton and the President was Mary Fildes who soon after stood on the platform with Henry Hunt, the key orator at the Peterloo Massacre. The Society flag had the figure of Justice on it. In the first week of the formation of the Society 1000 members joined it.

== See also ==
- Female Political Union of the Working Classes
