= David Willis Wilson Henderson =

Scottish-born microbiologist (1903–1968)

David Willis Wilson Henderson CB FRS (23 July 1903 – 16 August 1968) was a Scottish-born microbiologist; a former president of the Society for General Microbiology and recipient of the US Medal of Freedom.

== Early life and career ==
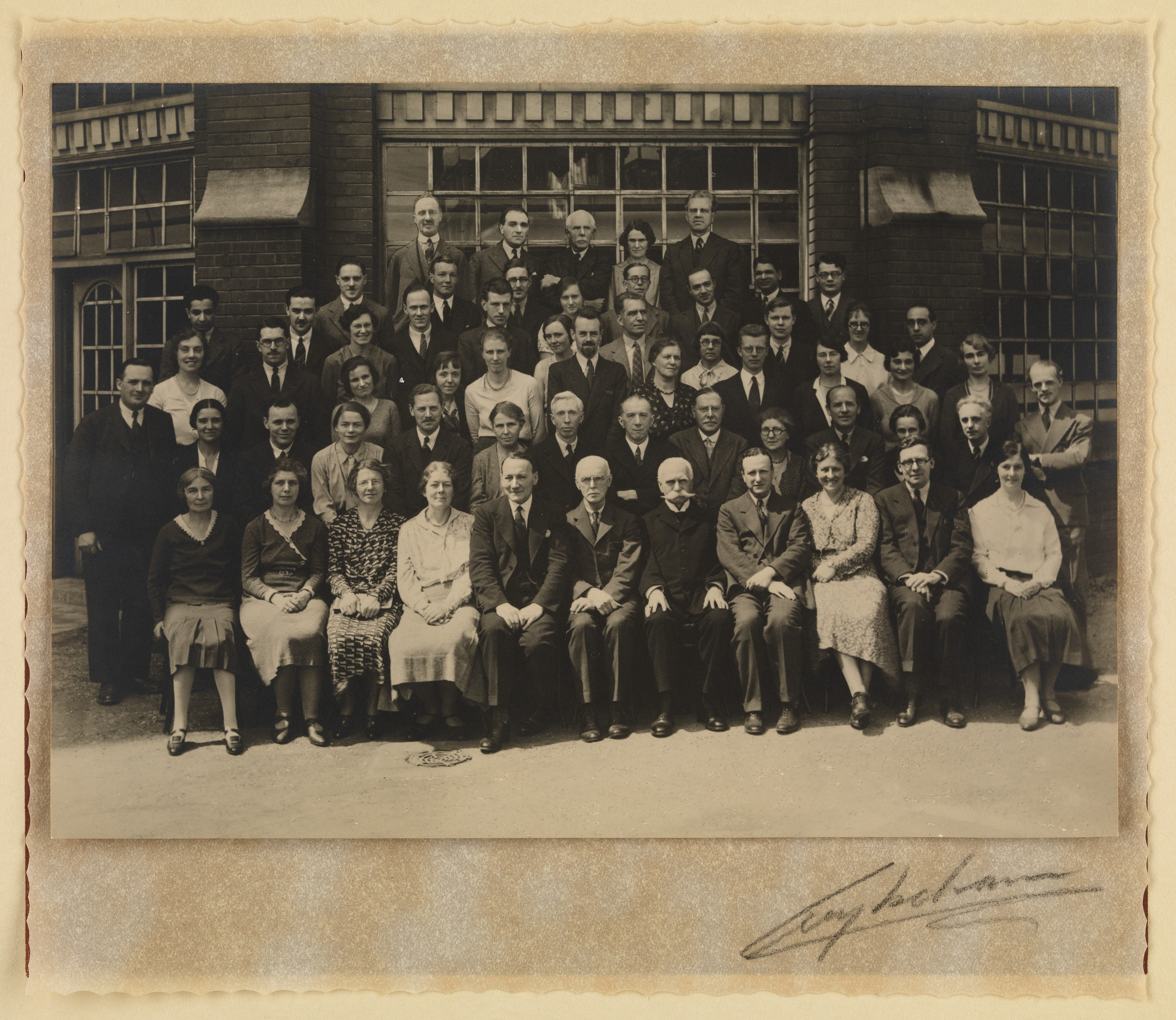
Henderson and other members of the Lister Institute (1933)

Born in Glasgow on 23 July 1903, Henderson subsequently attended the Hamilton Academy, described by Sir Tam Dalyell, former Father of the House of Commons, as "a remarkable school" with "a formidable academic reputation." Matriculating at the University of Glasgow, reading agricultural bacteriology and enrolling at the West of Scotland Agricultural College, Henderson graduated in 1926, subsequently being appointed a lecturer in bacteriology at King's College, Durham University, where, in 1930, he was awarded an MSc degree for his work on anaerobic infection in lambs. In the same year he married his first wife, Beatrice Mary Davenport Abell, daughter of Sir Westcott Abell, KBE, the celebrated naval architect and surveyor, and Professor of Naval Architecture at Armstrong College, an affiliated college of the University of Durham. In 1931, awarded a Carnegie Research Fellowship, Henderson embarked on research at the Lister Institute of Preventive Medicine, London, and was subsequently awarded a Beit Memorial Research Fellowship for the years 1932–35. In 1934 Henderson was to be awarded a PhD from the University of London for his thesis, 'Studies on the spore-bearing anaerobes with experiments on active and passive immunity.'

== The war years ==
Engaged in research work on immunology and the effects of the administering of toxins via aerosols at the Lister Institute's Serum Department at Elstree, by summer of 1940 Henderson was to find himself seconded to the Ministry of Supply and working between the Lister Institute and the government's Chemical Defence Experimental Establishment, at Porton Down in Wiltshire. In October 1940, on the instruction of the War Council a team of microbiologists was assembled, including David Henderson, to research use and protection against bacterial agents under the leadership of Paul Fildes. It was initially known as the Biology Department, Porton (BDP) and would later become the autonomous Microbiological Research Establishment. The same year Henderson was awarded a DSc degree by the University of London.

In 1943 Henderson was one of a team sent to the United States to advise on protection against biological warfare and for the remainder of the War was to continue his work on both sides of the Atlantic, for which work he was awarded in 1946 the US Medal of Freedom, Bronze Palm.

== Later career ==
In January 1946 Henderson had succeeded Fildes at Porton Down as director of the renamed microbiological research department and an advisory panel had been assembled by the Ministry of Supply under the chairmanship of Maurice Hankey. Under Henderson's direction new laboratories at Porton Down were built between 1948 and 1951 and these and the work done there by Henderson and his team gained an international reputation in microbiology, recognised in the award to Henderson of the CB in 1957 and his election to the Royal Society in 1959, in which year the Ministry of Supply was dissolved and Henderson's department was to come within the remit of the War Office.

David Henderson was a founding member of the Society for General Microbiology, a member of its committee from 1947 to 1951, and in 1963 was elected its president. He wrote and co-wrote numerous published scientific papers during his career.

Henderson's first wife died in 1952 and in the following year he married Emily Helen Kelly of New York, a bacteriologist who had been his assistant in the USA during the War.

David Willis Wilson Henderson died on 16 August 1968.

== Awards and honours ==
1930 – MSc degree by Durham University

1934 – PhD by the University of London

1940 – DSc degree by the University of London

1946 – US Medal of Freedom, Bronze Palm

1957 – Companion of The Most Honourable Order of the Bath

1959 – Fellowship of the Royal Society
