= Blackburn Female Reform Society =

The Blackburn Female Reform Society was established in Blackburn in early July 1819. They immediately sent a circular to other districts, inviting the wives and daughters of the workmen in the different branches of manufacturing to form themselves into similar societies. In response Manchester formed their own society of reformers on 20 July 1819. In Nottingham, reformers decided to adopt the Blackburn model.

"In Blackburn the members of the Female Reform Society pledged themselves "to use our utmost endeavor to instill into our children a deep and rooted hatred of our corrupt and tyrannical rulers". One means was the use of the Bad Alphabet for the Use of the Children of Female Reformers: B is for Bible, Bishop and Bigotry; K is for King, Kings Evil and Knave and Kidnapper; W is for Whig, Weakness, Wavering and Wicked."

— E. P. Thomson, The Making of the English Working Class

The Blackburn reformers model involved gift-giving, including the presentation of caps of liberty, action which was mirrored by societies in Stockport and Galston.
