= Applicants for Admission to a Casual Ward =

Painting by Luke Fildes

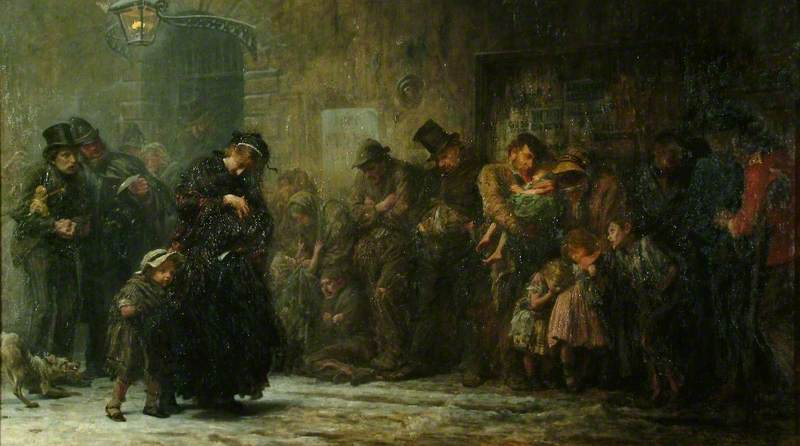
- Artist: Luke Fildes
- Year: 1874
- Medium: Oil on canvas
- Dimensions: 137.1 cm × 243.7 cm (53.9 in × 95.9 in)
- Location: Royal Holloway, University of London, Egham

Applicants for Admission to a Casual Ward is an 1874 oil painting by British painter Luke Fildes, a key work in nineteenth-century British social realism. The painting shows a street scene of impoverished and weary men, women and children waiting by the side of the road outside a police station, huddled against the cold evening, waiting to be given a ticket for temporary admission to a workhouse for the night. Many resisted taking up permanent residence at the workhouse, where men and women would be separated, and would be required to work to pay for their board and lodging; once they entered, many only left when they died. Instead, from 1864, if the police in London certified that a person was genuinely in need, they could stay for one night on a "casual" basis, and leave the next morning, but they would have to queue up again for temporary admission the next evening. Poverty and vagrancy were pressing issues in Victorian London, and the issuance of "casual" tickets doubled from around 200,000 in 1864 to over 400,000 in 1869.

Fildes' painting is based on his earlier engraving Houseless and Hungry, which was published in the first issue of The Graphic illustrated newspaper of 4 December 1869, accompanying an article on the Metropolitan Houseless Poor Act 1864. Fildes based the composition on a scene that he had witnessed when he moved to London. He paid several of the homeless people he saw to model for him. John Everett Millais pointed out the image to Charles Dickens, and Dickens commissioned Fildes to illustrate his next – and ultimately his last and unfinished – novel, The Mystery of Edwin Drood. Fildes illustrated the six instalments, completed before the death of Dickens in June 1870 and published from April to September 1870, but the remaining six parts were not completed.

Several years later, Fildes completed his large oil painting on a similar subject, 54 by 96 inches (140 cm × 240 cm), which was exhibited at the Royal Academy summer exhibition in 1874. Fildes changed the composition, adding colour, more depth, and more women and children. The apparent reasons for the plight of the poor people depicted vary – one may be a drunkard, there is an old man, a father holding his son's hand, an unaccompanied woman (perhaps a widow) with a child, and an invalid soldier in his redcoat. A well-dressed man to the left in a top hat speaks to a policeman, disturbed by the scene.

The painting was 8 feet (2.4 m) wide, a scale usually reserved for history painting, which was traditionally regarded as the highest form of painting in Western art. Alongside the painting's listing in the exhibition catalogue was a description by Charles Dickens of Whitechapel Workhouse in 1855: "Dumb, wet, silent horrors! Sphinxes set up against that dead wall, and none likely to be at the pains of solving them until the general overthrow." (This text was taken from a letter from Dickens to John Forster, included in Forster's published biography of Dickens.)

Most critics praised the work for its simplicity, truthfulness of characterisation, and lack of easy sentimentality, but others criticised it for the same reasons, condemning its squalor and hopelessness, and rejecting it as a suitable subject for a painting in an art gallery. Nevertheless, it became very popular with the viewing public, so much that a barrier was erected to keep back the crowd – an accolade rarely accorded: previous examples include David Wilkie's Chelsea Pensioners reading the Waterloo Dispatch in 1822, and William Powell Frith's The Derby Day in 1858 and The Salon d'Or, Homburg in 1871. A rail was also required for Lady Butler's The Roll Call, also exhibited at the exhibition in 1874.

== Provenance ==
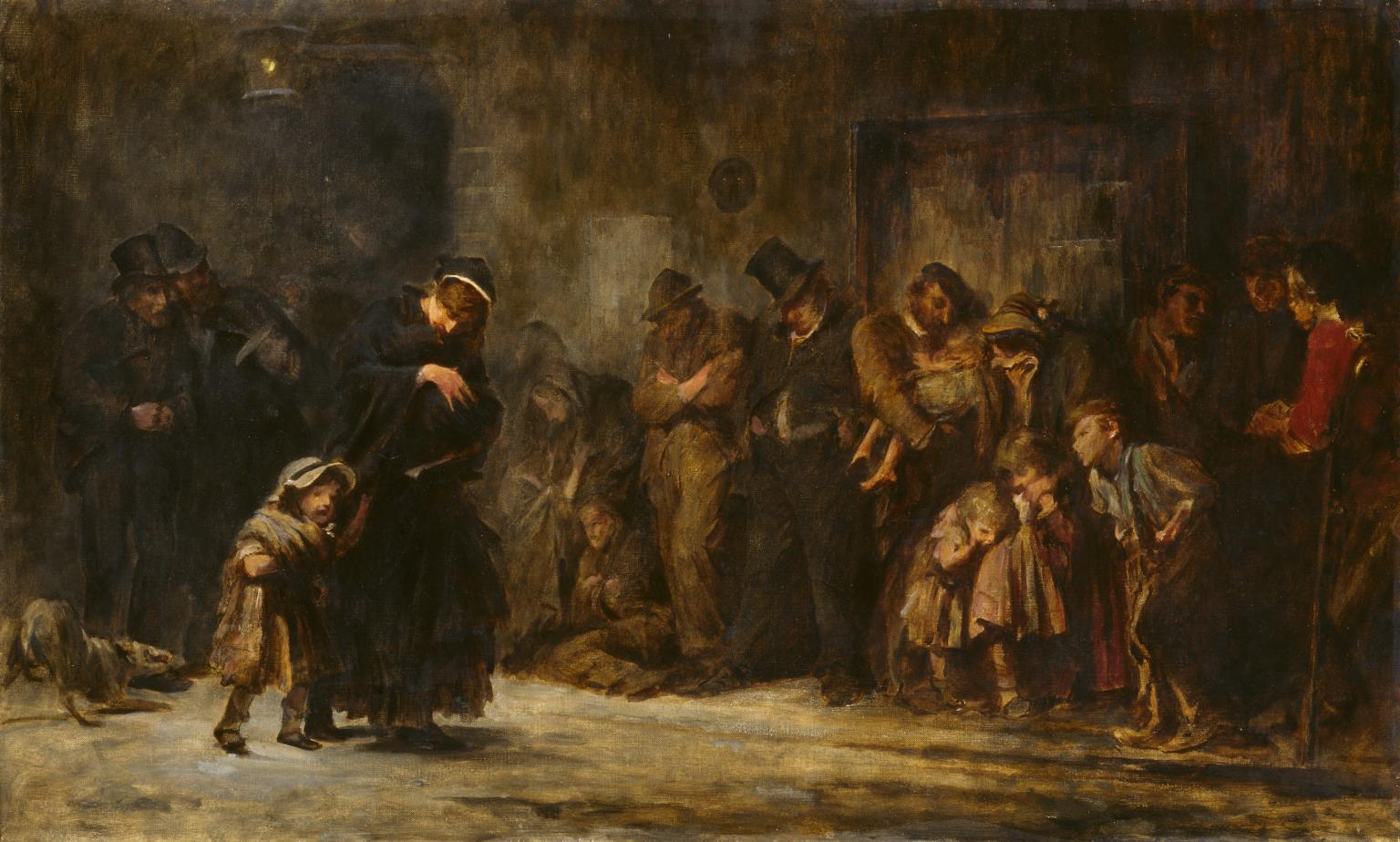
Applicants for Admission to the Casual Ward at Saint Martin in the Fields, smaller version held by the Tate Gallery, 22.5 by 37 inches (57 cm × 94 cm), c. 1908

Vincent van Gogh was in London when the work was exhibited: he saw it in 1874, and later bought an engraving reprinted in The Graphic Portfolio in 1877, and wrote about it favourably in several letters to his brother Theo van Gogh in 1882.

The original oil painting was bought by Thomas Holloway in 1883 and remains in the collection of Royal Holloway College, London. A smaller later copy in oils, 22.5 by 37 inches (57 cm × 94 cm), has been in the collection of the Tate Gallery since 1970. Made by Fildes after 1908, this copy remained in the artist's collection until his death, and it was sold at Christie's in June 1927. Acquired by Gooden & Fox for Mrs Edwin Ridsdale Tate, inherited by her daughter Edith (who married Frederick William Wignall), and sold in 1958 to Sir Leonard Stone, it was sold at Christie's again in July 1970 and bought by Jeremy Maas for the Tate Gallery.

The 1927 Fildes auction also included a work measuring 24 by 45.5 inches (61 cm × 116 cm) described as "the original sketch", bought by Sir Aston Webb, but its location is now unknown.
