= Luke Fildes =

English painter (1843–1927)

Sir Luke Fildes KCVO RA
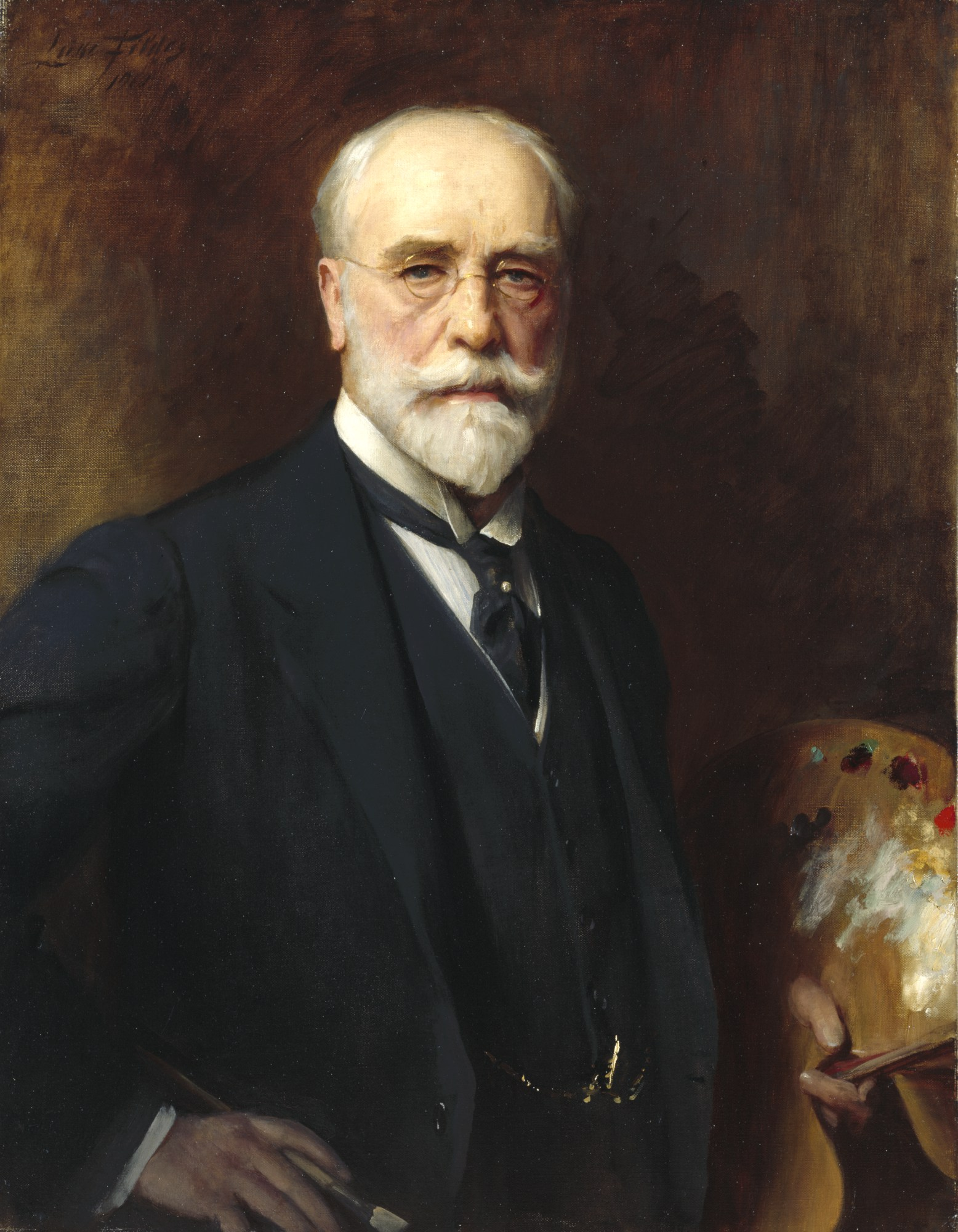
- Self-portrait, 1911
- Born: Samuel Luke Fildes; 3 October 1843; Liverpool, England, United Kingdom of Great Britain and Ireland
- Died: 28 February 1927 (aged 83); Kensington, London, England, United Kingdom
- Occupations: Painter, illustrator
- Children: Luke Val Fildes, Paul Fildes
- Relatives: Mary Fildes (grandmother)

Sir Samuel Luke Fildes KCVO RA (3 October 1843 – 28 February 1927) was a British painter and illustrator born in Liverpool and trained at the South Kensington and Royal Academy Schools. He was the grandson of the political activist Mary Fildes.

== Illustrator ==
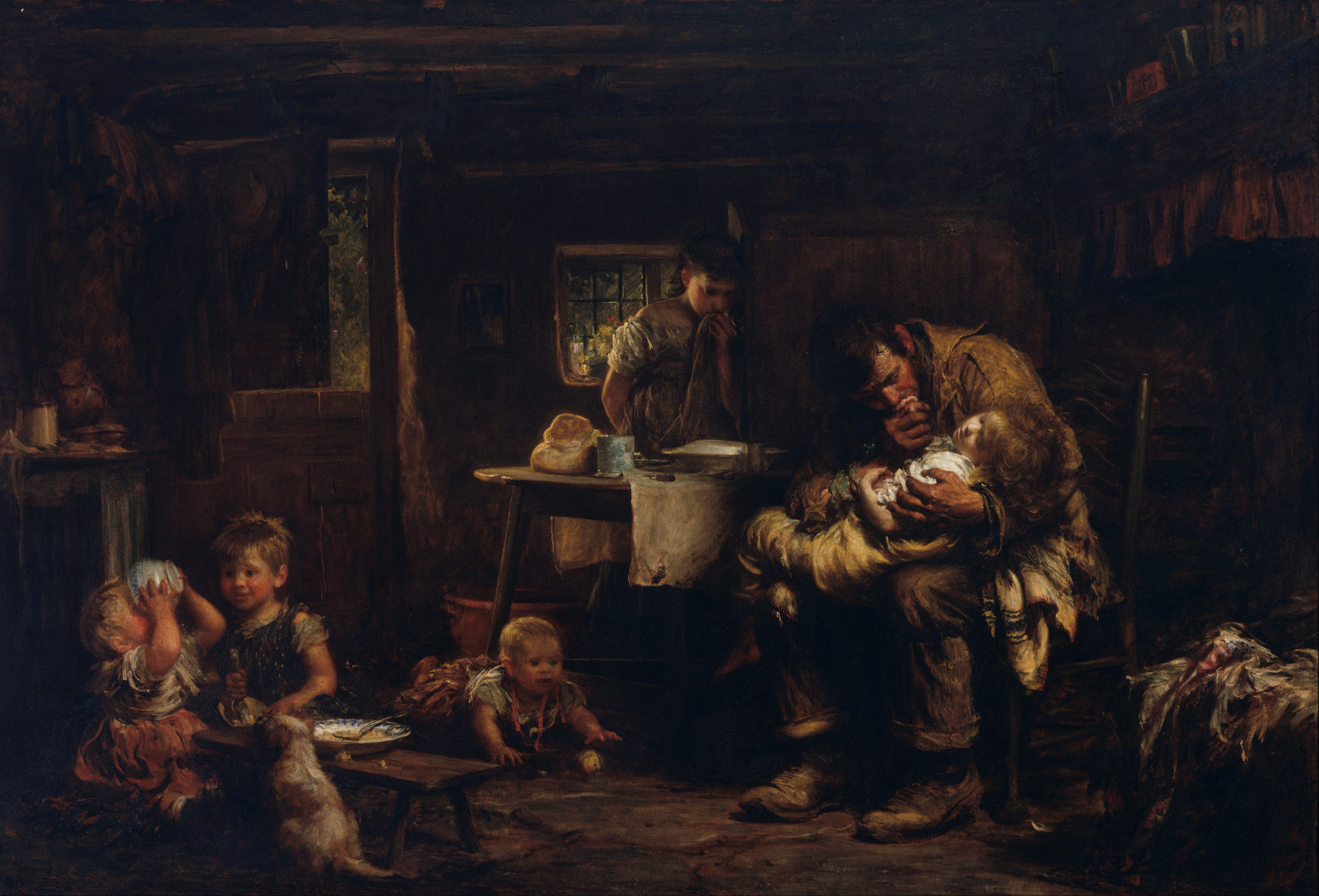
The Widower, c. 1875-1876

At the age of 17, Fildes became a student at the Warrington School of Art. Fildes moved to the South Kensington Art School where he met Hubert von Herkomer and Frank Holl. All three men became influenced by the work of Frederick Walker, the leader of the social realist movement in Britain.

Fildes shared his grandmother's concern for the poor and in 1869 joined the staff of The Graphic newspaper, an illustrated weekly began and edited by the social reformer, William Luson Thomas. Fildes shared Thomas' belief in the power of visual images to change public opinion on subjects such as poverty and injustice. Thomas hoped that the images in The Graphic would result in individual acts of charity and collective social action.

Fildes' illustrations were in the black-and-white style popular in France and Germany during the era. He worked in a social realist style, compatible with the editorial direction of The Graphic, and focused on images depicting the destitute of London. The Graphic published an illustration completed by Fildes the day after Charles Dickens' death, showing Dickens' empty chair in his study; this illustration was widely reprinted worldwide, and inspired Vincent van Gogh's painting The Yellow Chair.

In the first edition of The Graphic newspaper that appeared in December 1869, Luke Fildes was asked to provide an illustration to accompany an article on the Houseless Poor Act, a new measure that allowed some of those people out of work to shelter for a night in the casual ward of a workhouse. The picture produced by Fildes showed a line of homeless people applying for tickets to stay overnight in the workhouse. The wood-engraving, entitled Houseless and Hungry, was seen by John Everett Millais, who brought it to the attention of Charles Dickens. Dickens was so impressed that he immediately commissioned Fildes to illustrate his next novel, The Mystery of Edwin Drood; only six of a planned twelve instalments had been published, however, when Dickens' sudden death left the book unfinished.

Fildes' illustrations also appeared in other mass-circulation periodicals: Sunday Magazine, The Cornhill Magazine, and The Gentleman's Magazine. He also illustrated a number of books in addition to Dickens' Edwin Drood, such as Thackeray's Catherine (1894).

== Painter ==
Fildes soon became a popular artist and by 1870 he had given up working for The Graphic and had turned his full attention to oil painting. He took rank among the ablest English painters, with The Casual Ward (1874), The Widower (1876), The Village Wedding (1883), An Al-fresco Toilette (1889); and The Doctor (1891), now in Tate Britain. He also painted a number of pictures of Venetian life and many notable portraits, among them portraits commemorating the coronation of King Edward VII and Queen Alexandra. He was elected an Associate of the Royal Academy (A.S.A.) in 1879, and a Royal Academician (R.A.) in 1887; and was knighted by King Edward VII in 1906. In 1918, he was appointed as Knight Commander of the Royal Victorian Order (KCVO) by King George V. Fildes produced a large number of caricatures for Vanity Fair under the nom de crayon "ELF". He and Henry Woods were regarded as leaders of the Neo-Venetian school.

== Personal life ==
In 1874 Luke Fildes married Fanny Woods, who was also an artist and the sister of Henry Woods.

Fildes' first son, Philip, died of typhoid in 1877. The image of the doctor at his son's side during the ordeal left a lasting memory of professional devotion that inspired Fildes' 1891 work The Doctor.

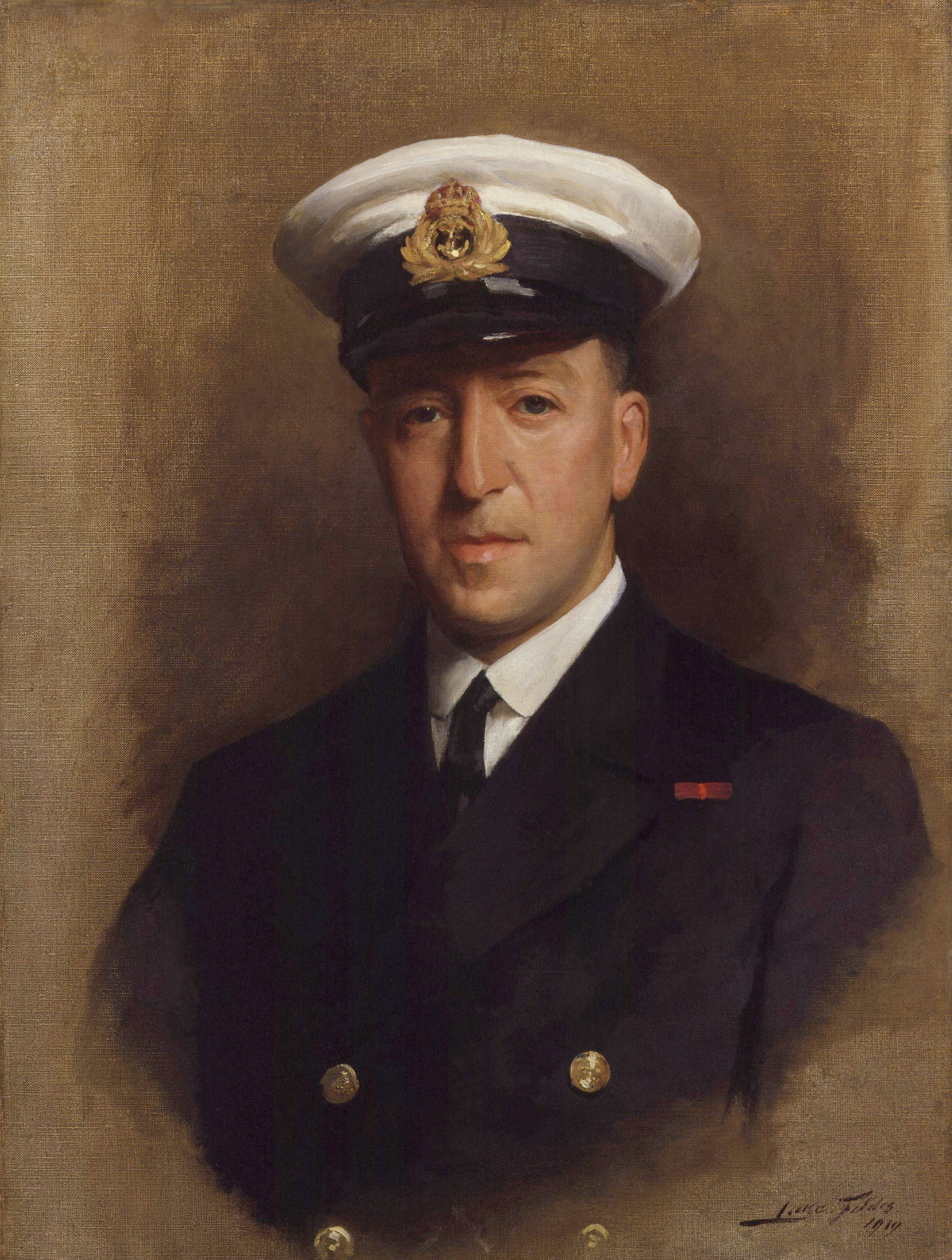
Fildes' painting of his son Paul Fildes in 1919

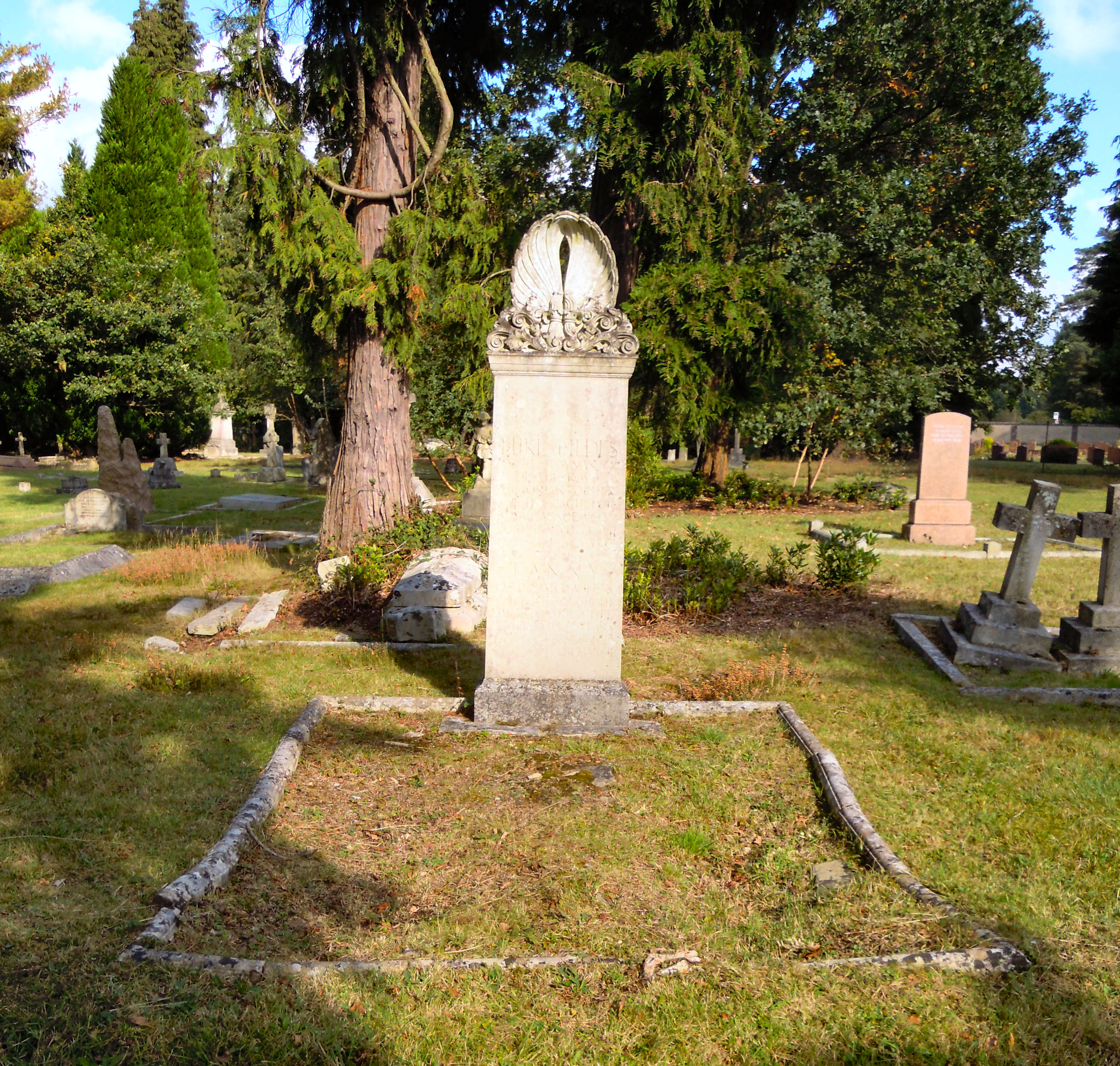
Fildes's grave in Brookwood Cemetery

Luke Val Fildes was Olympic fencer, solicitor and company secretary. His later son, Sir Paul Fildes, was an eminent scientist. Another son had a distinguished naval career, Lieutenant Commander Denis Quentin Fildes (1889–1975). They also had one more son, Geoffrey, and a daughter, Phyllis.

Fildes died in 1927 and is buried in Brookwood Cemetery (Plot 36).

A blue plaque marks Fildes's former house, Woodland House, in Melbury Road, Kensington, next to William Burges's Tower House. His home was later owned by film director Michael Winner.

== Modern politics ==
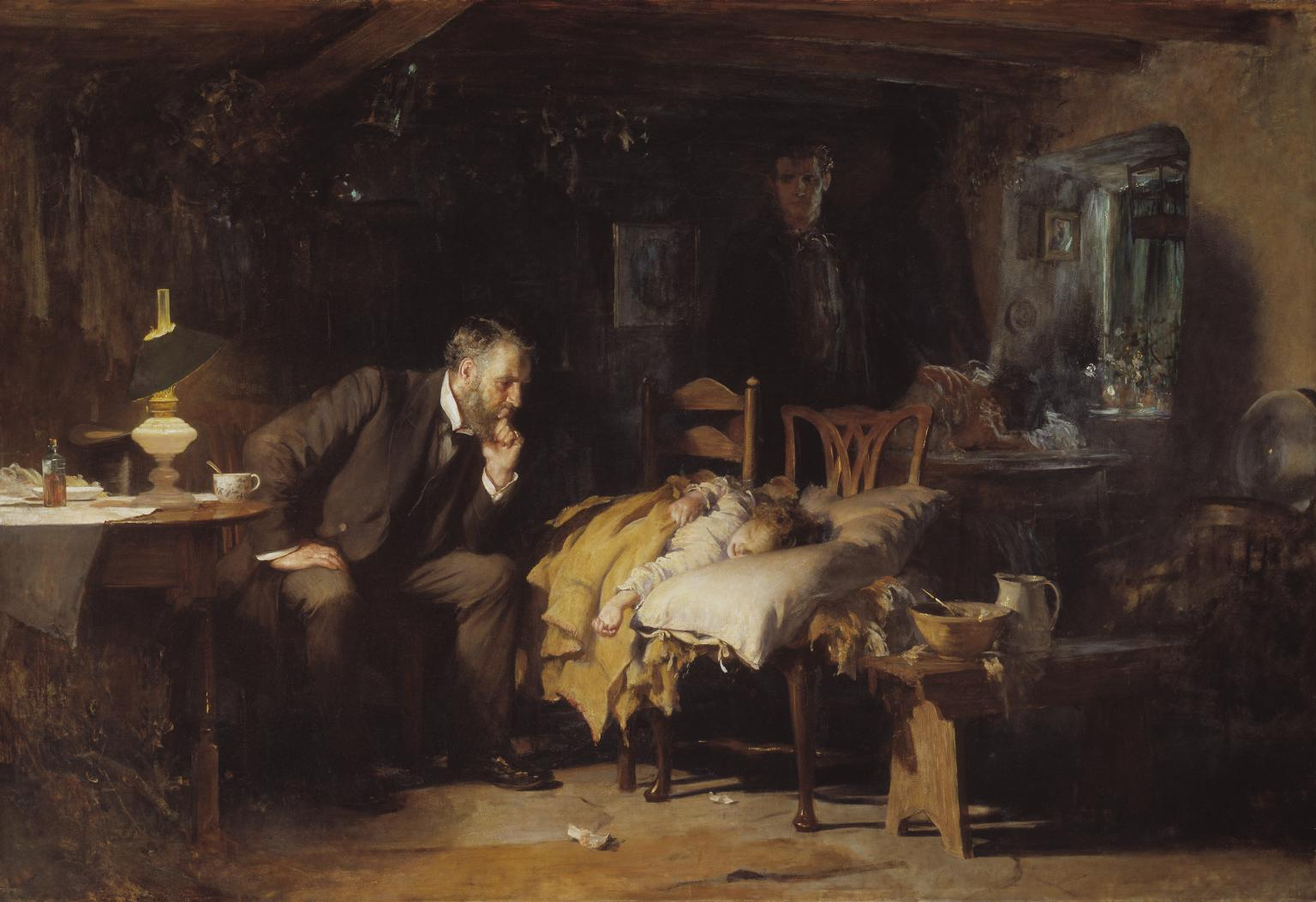
The Doctor, an 1891 portrait by Fildes

In 1949 Fildes' painting The Doctor (1891) was used by the American Medical Association in a campaign against a proposal for nationalised medical care put forth by President Harry S. Truman. The image was used in posters and brochures along with the slogan, "Keep Politics Out of this Picture" implying that involvement of the government in medical care would negatively affect the quality of care. 65,000 posters of The Doctor were displayed, which helped to raise public scepticism for the nationalised health care campaign.

== Gallery ==
Works by Fildes

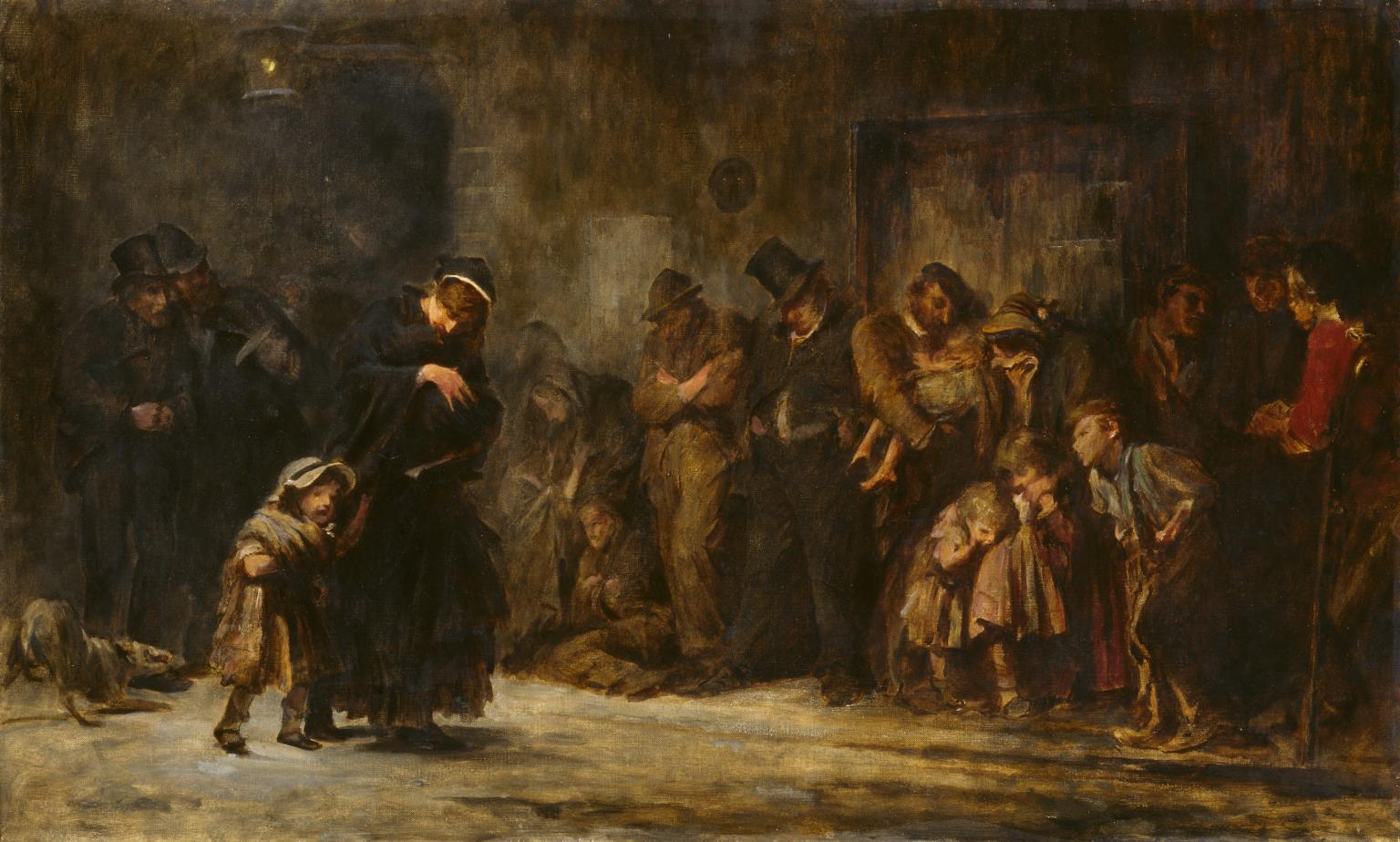
Applicants for Admission to a Casual Ward, smaller version of the 1874 painting, held by the Tate Gallery (after 1908)

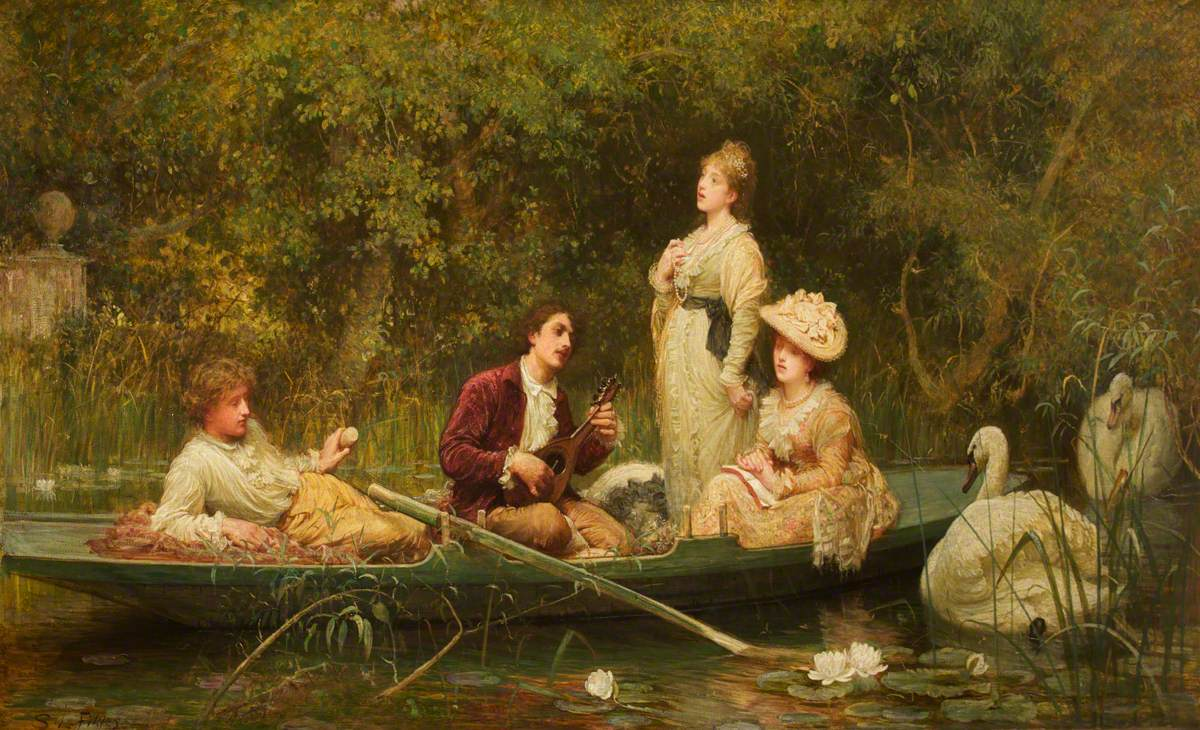
Fair Quiet and Sweet Rest, 1872

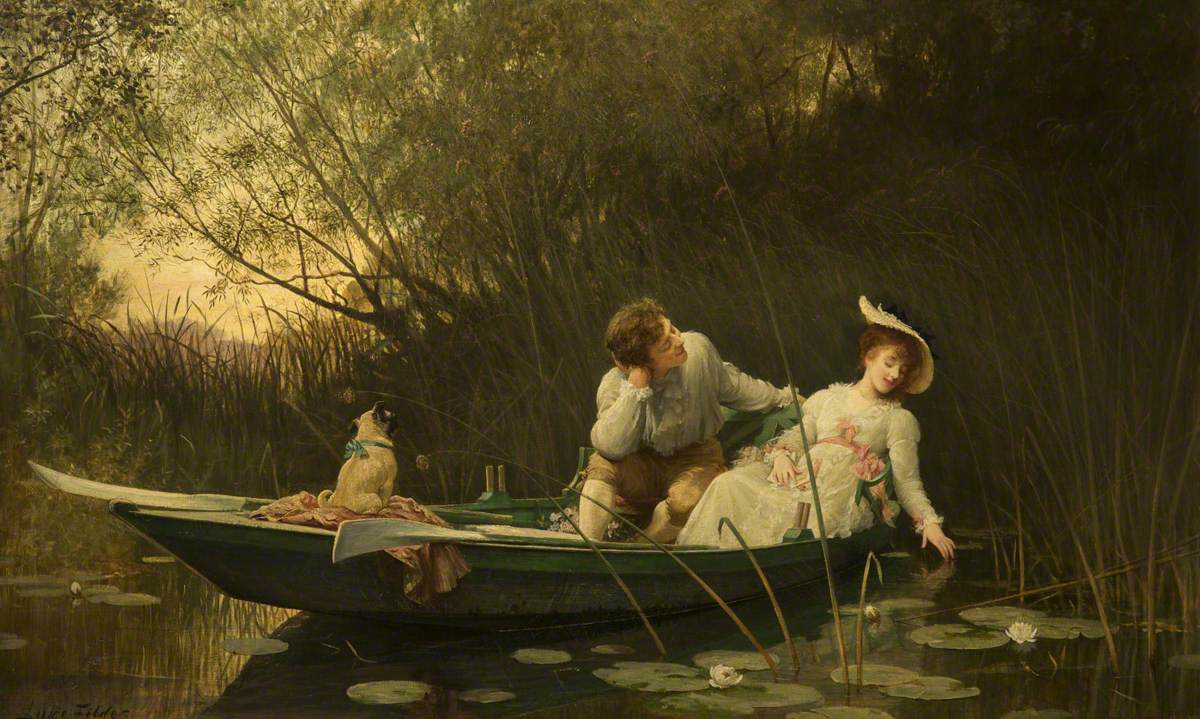
Simpletons (1873)

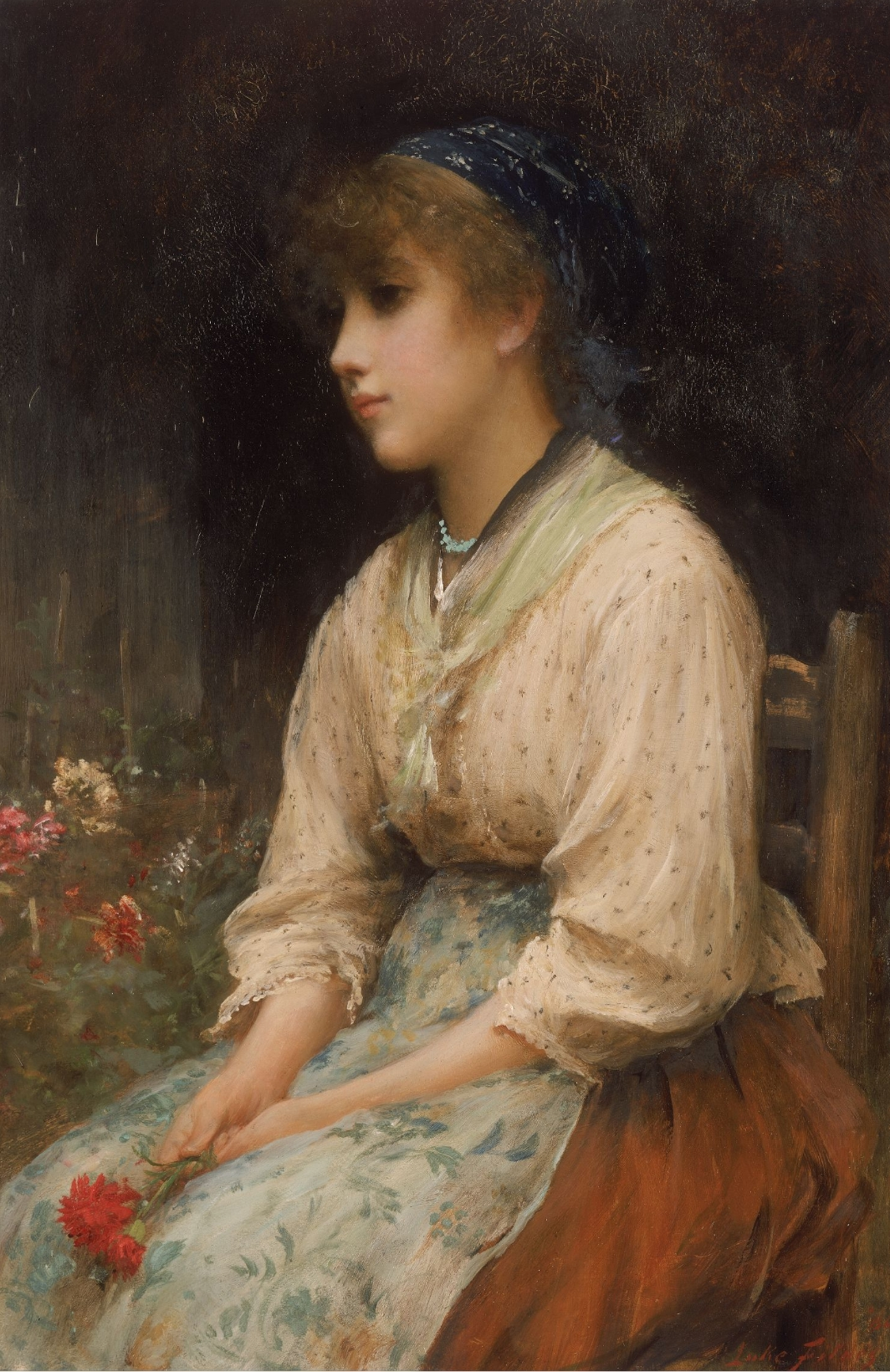
A Venetian Flower Girl (1877)

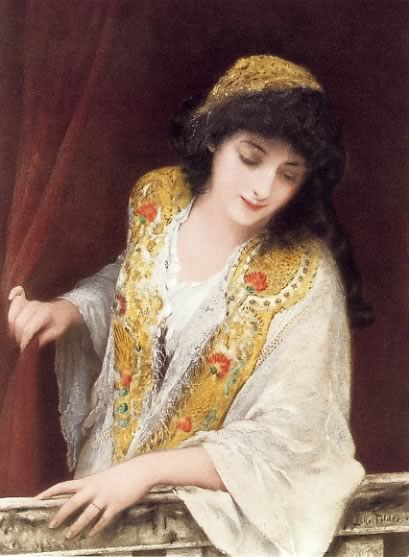
Jessica (1888)

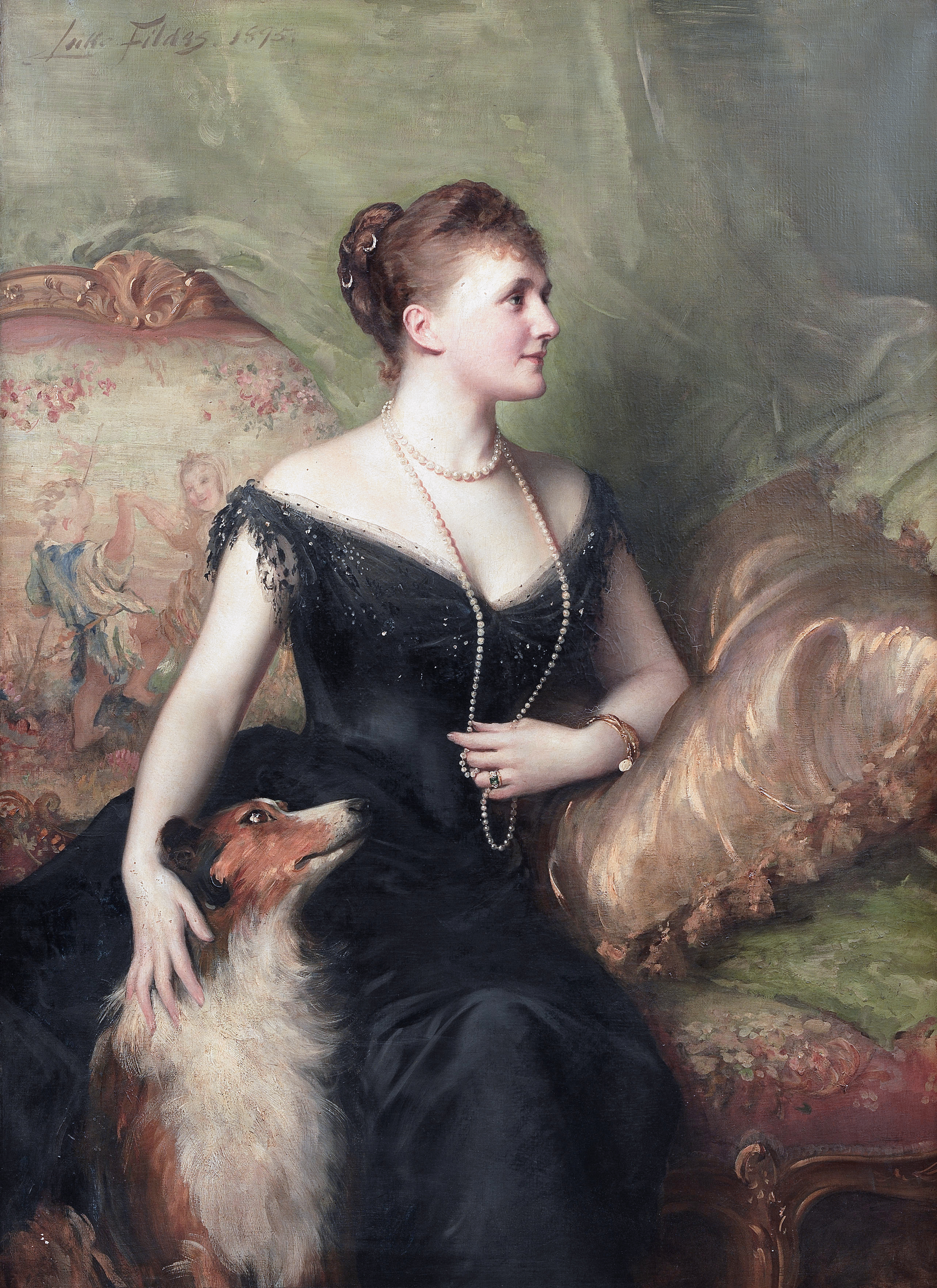
Mrs Mary Venetia James (1895)

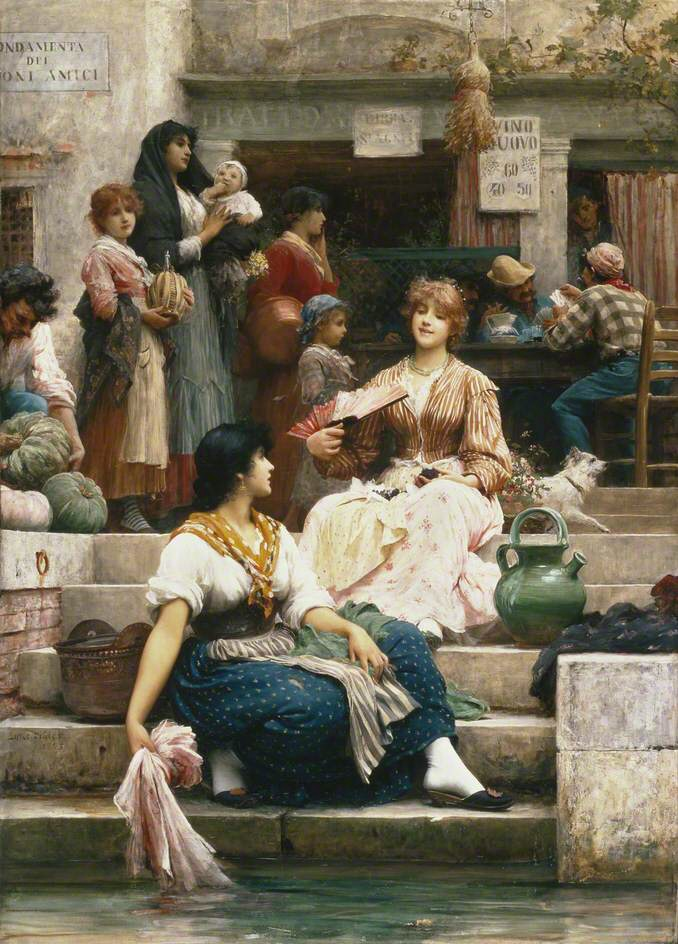
Italian scene (c. 1900), Venice

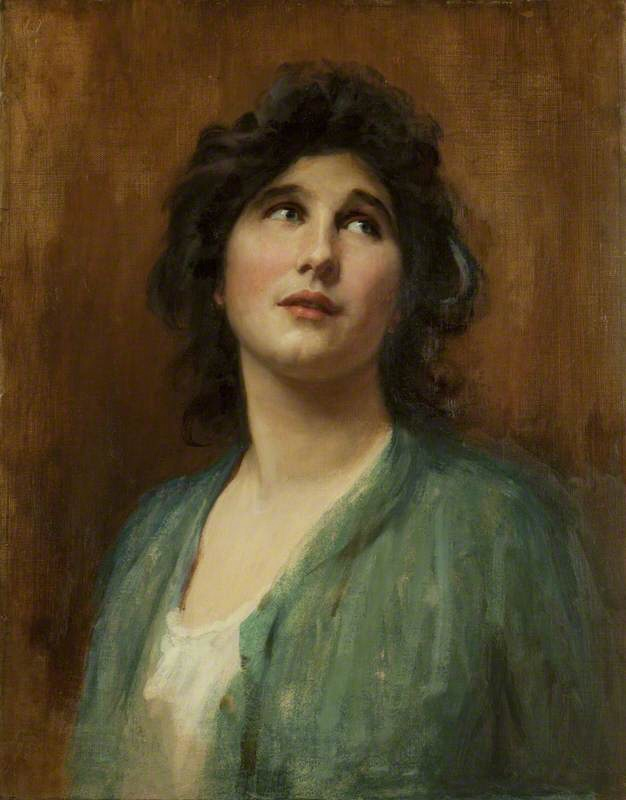
Portrait of a woman

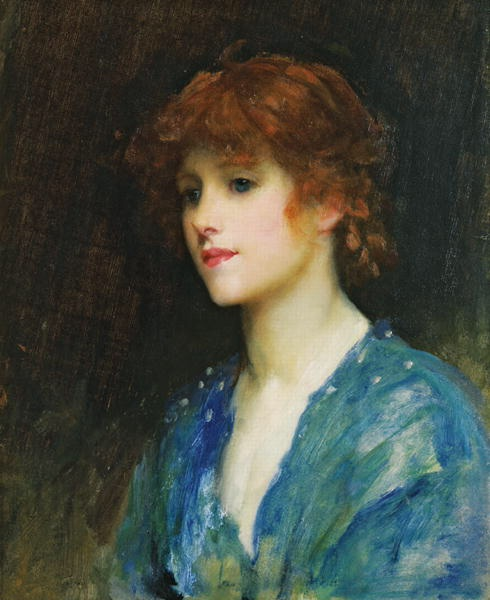
Venetta

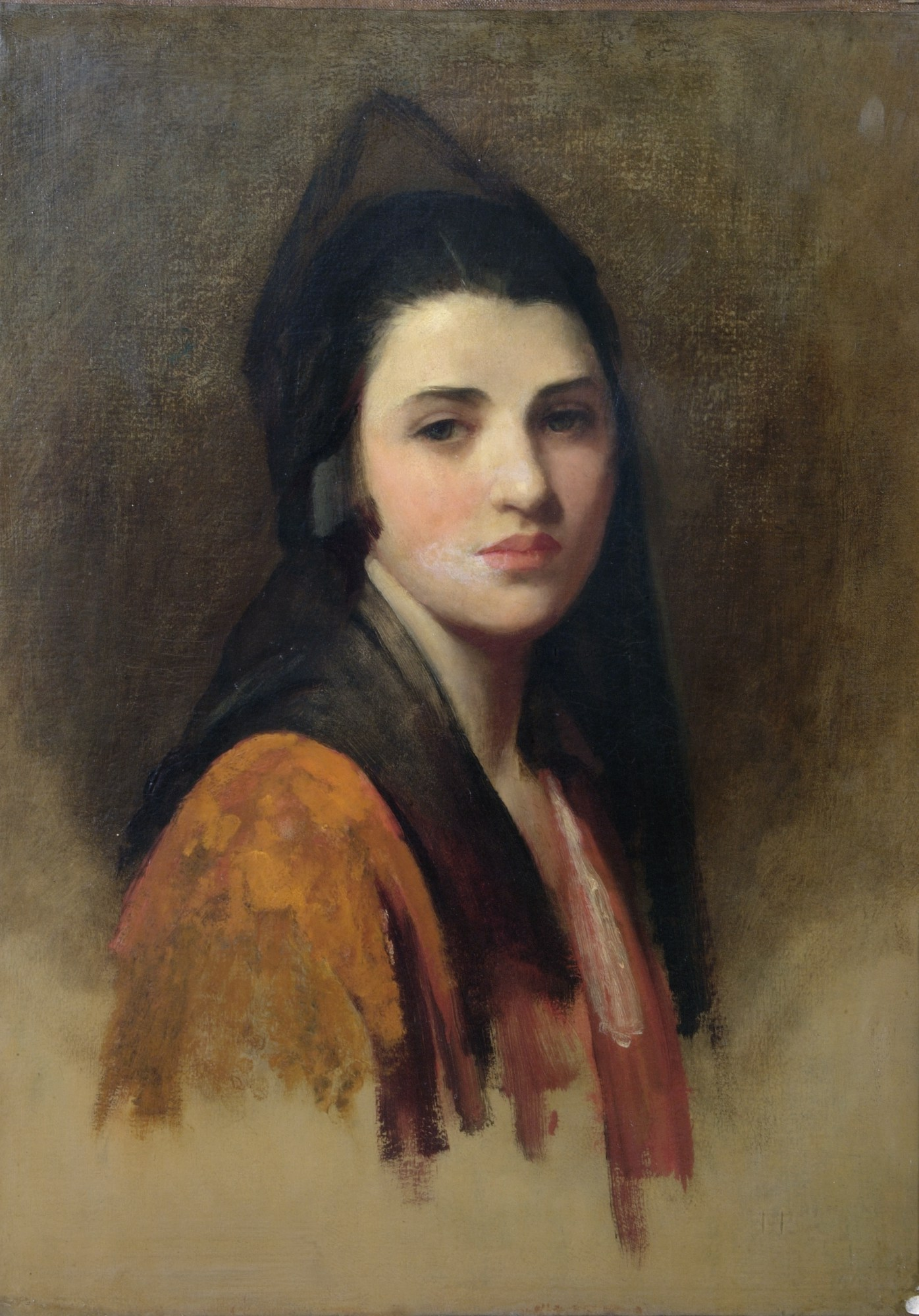
The mantilla (c. 1927)

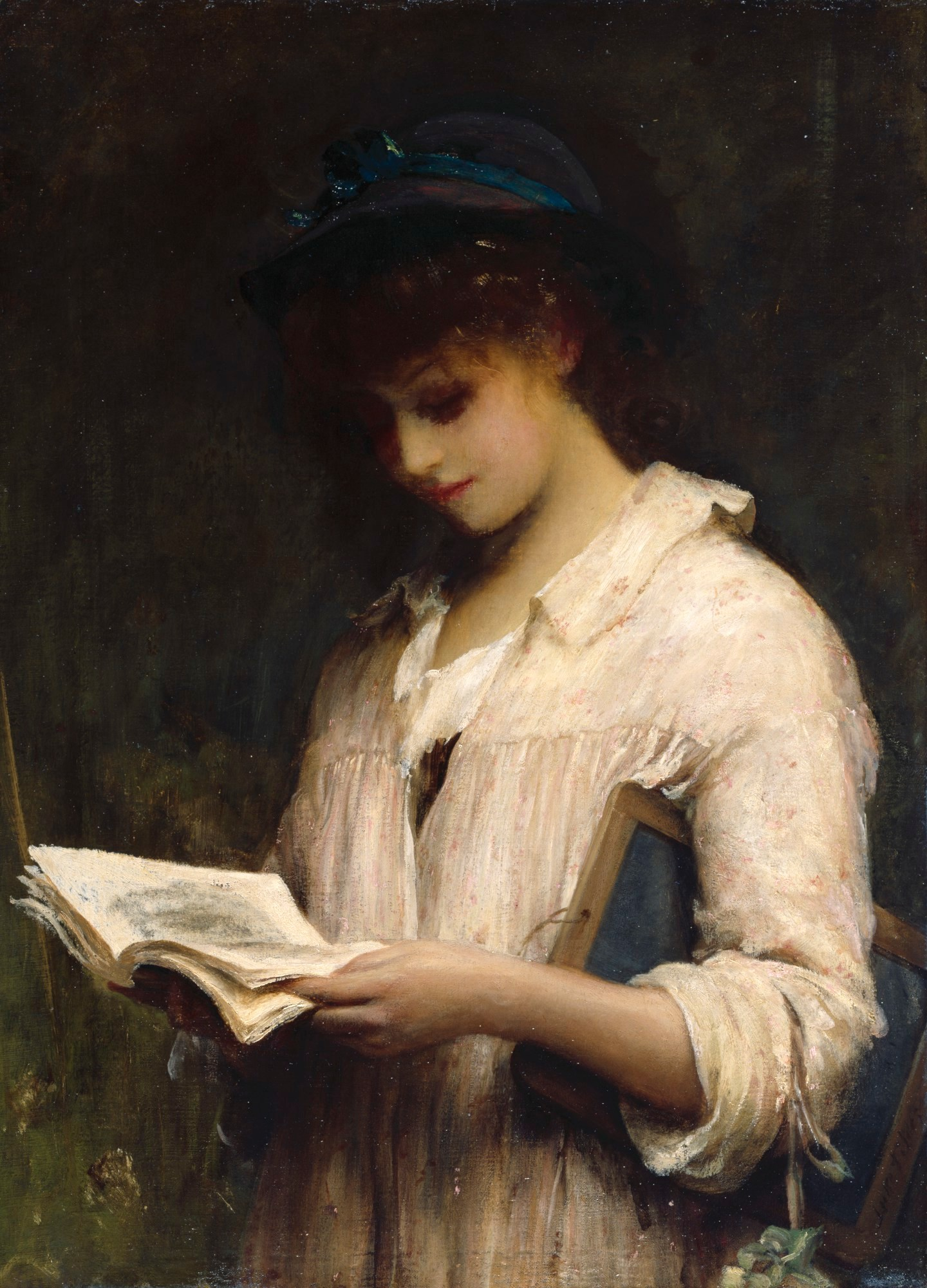
A Schoolgirl (1887)

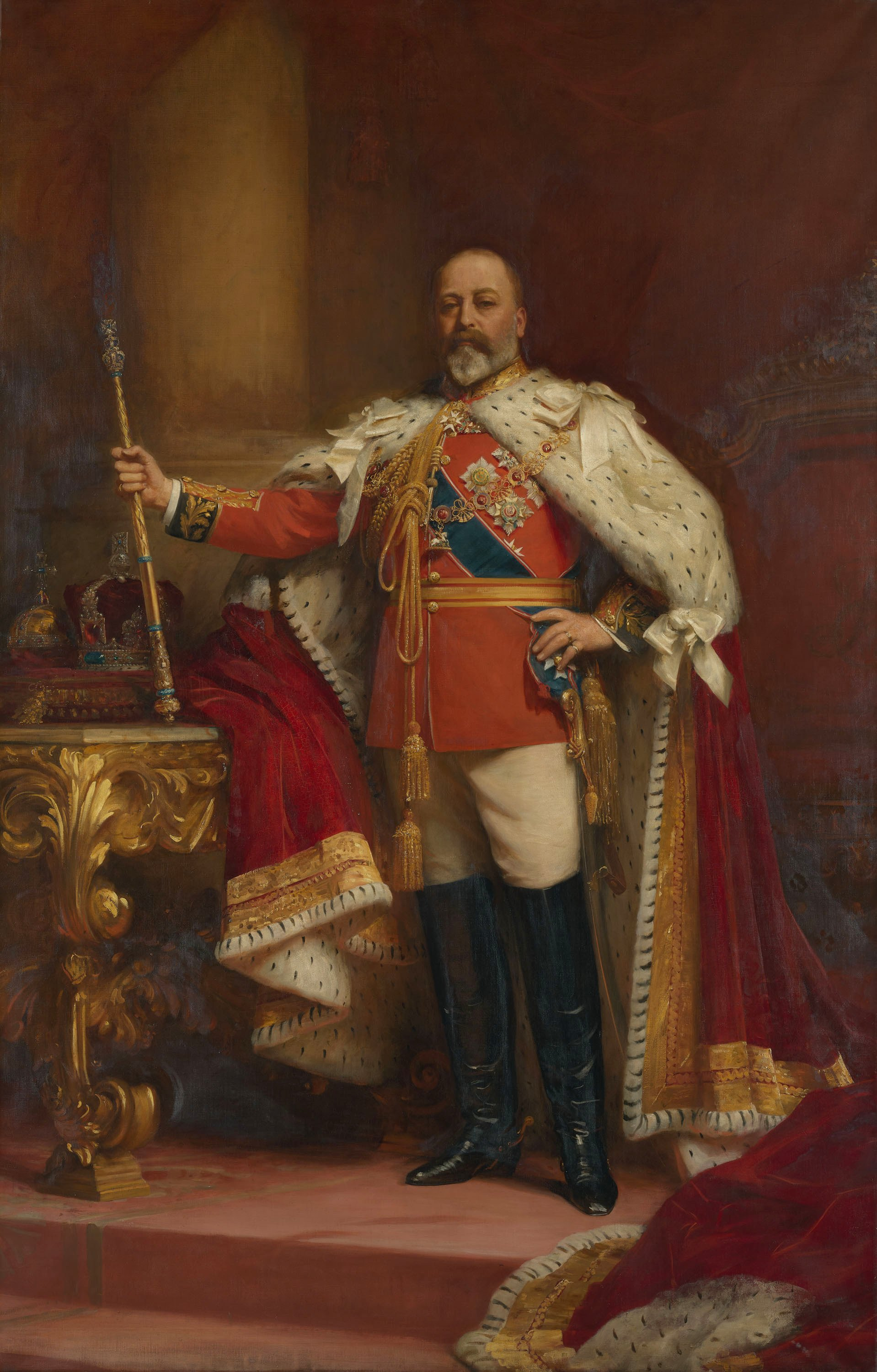
State portrait of Edward VII (1902)

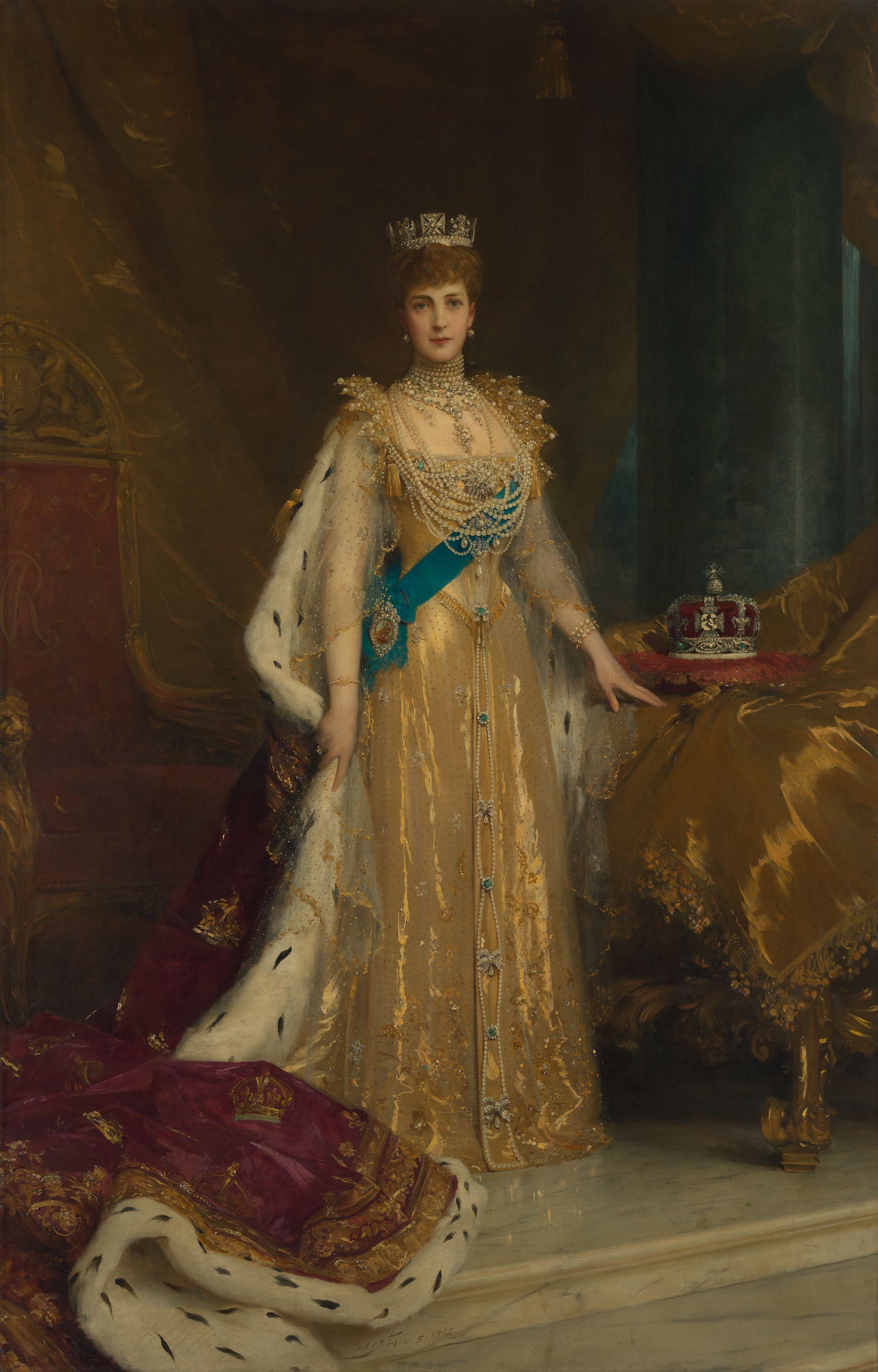
State portrait of Queen Alexandra, consort of Edward VII (1905)

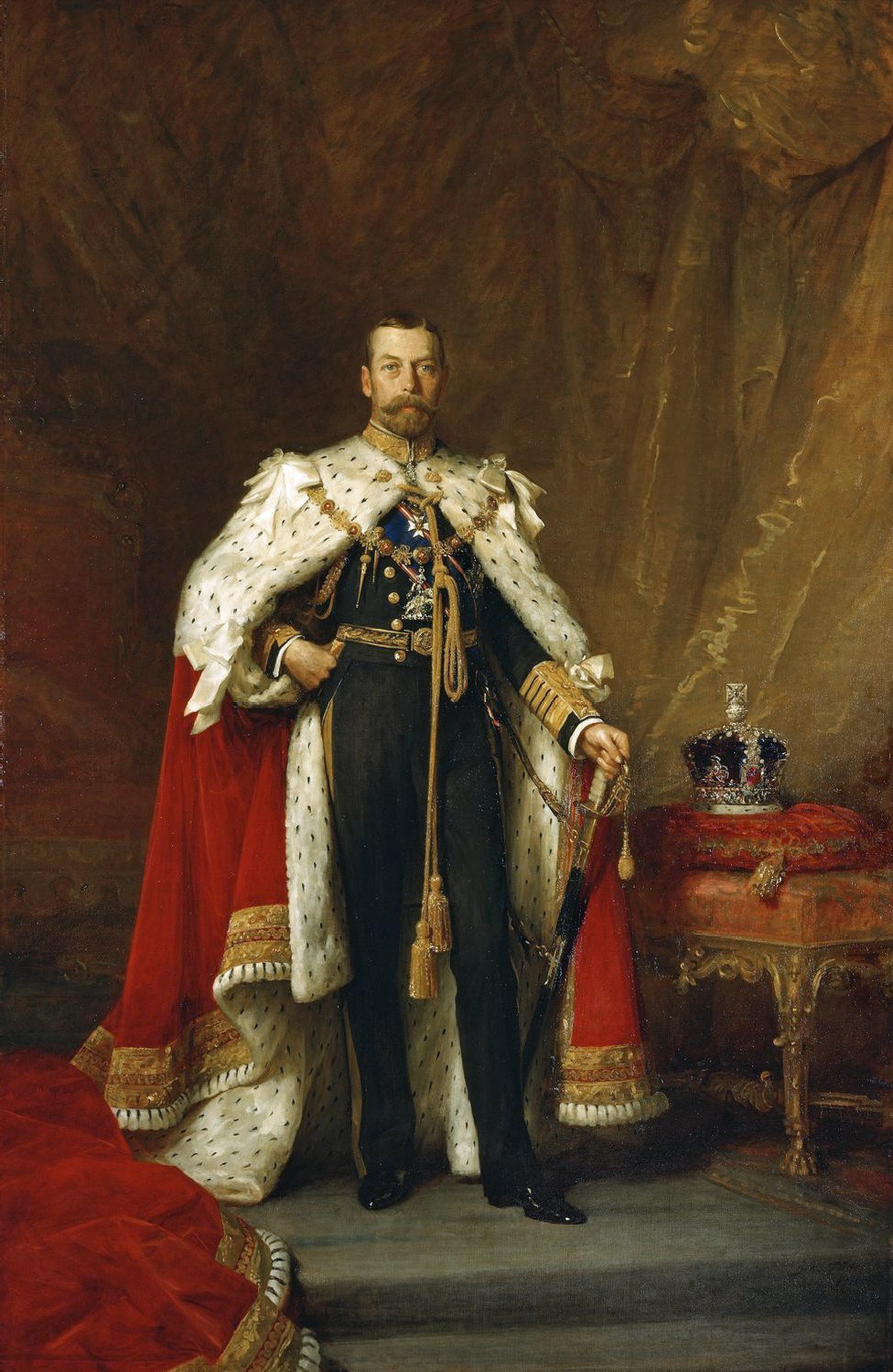
State portrait of George V (1911)

Related to Fildes

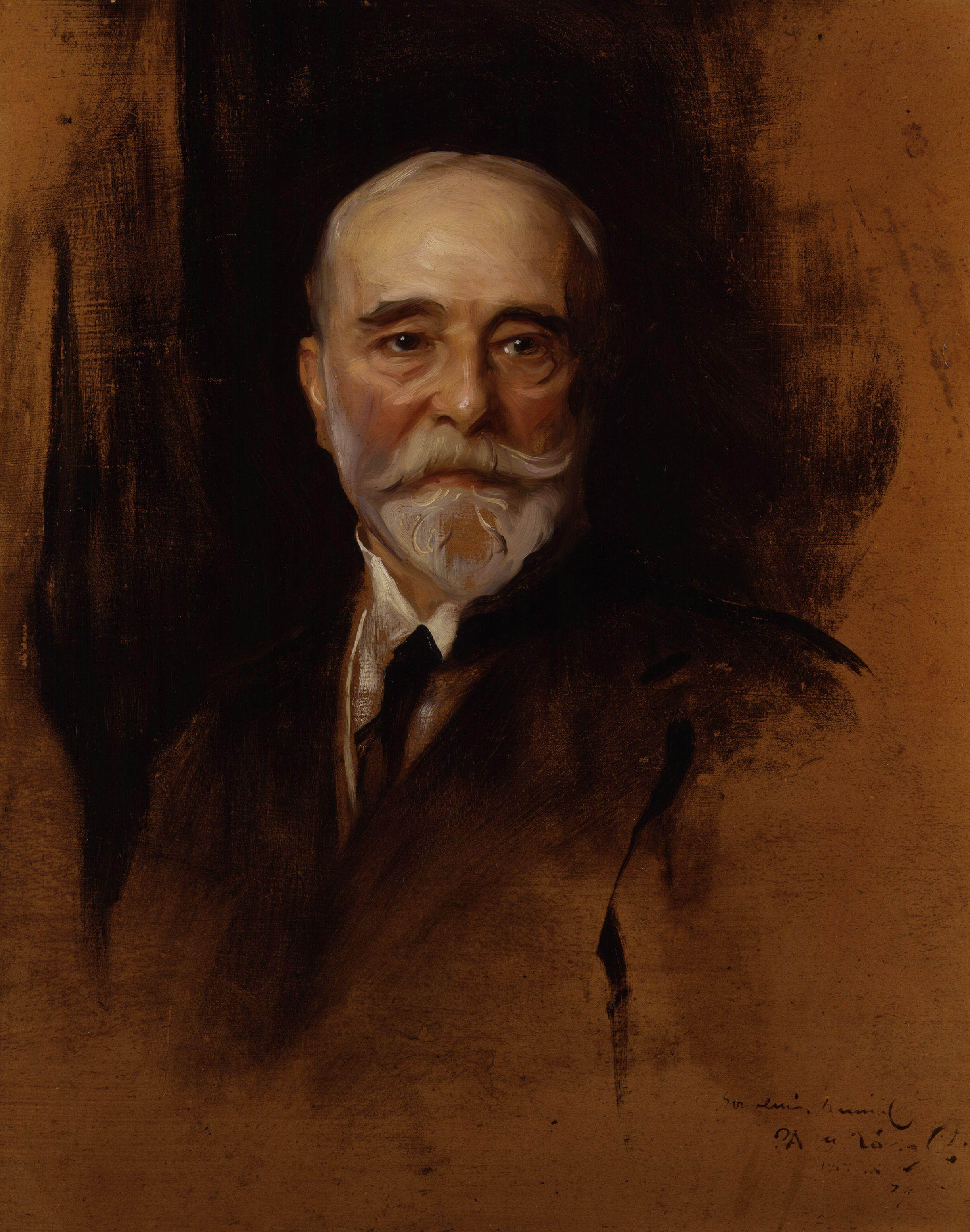
Portrait of Luke Fildes by Philip de László (1914)

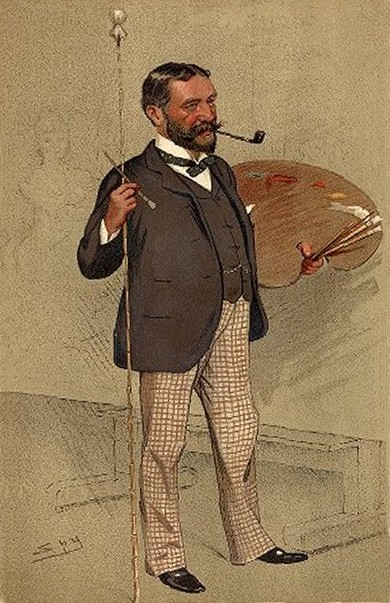
Luke Fildes "ELF" by Spy

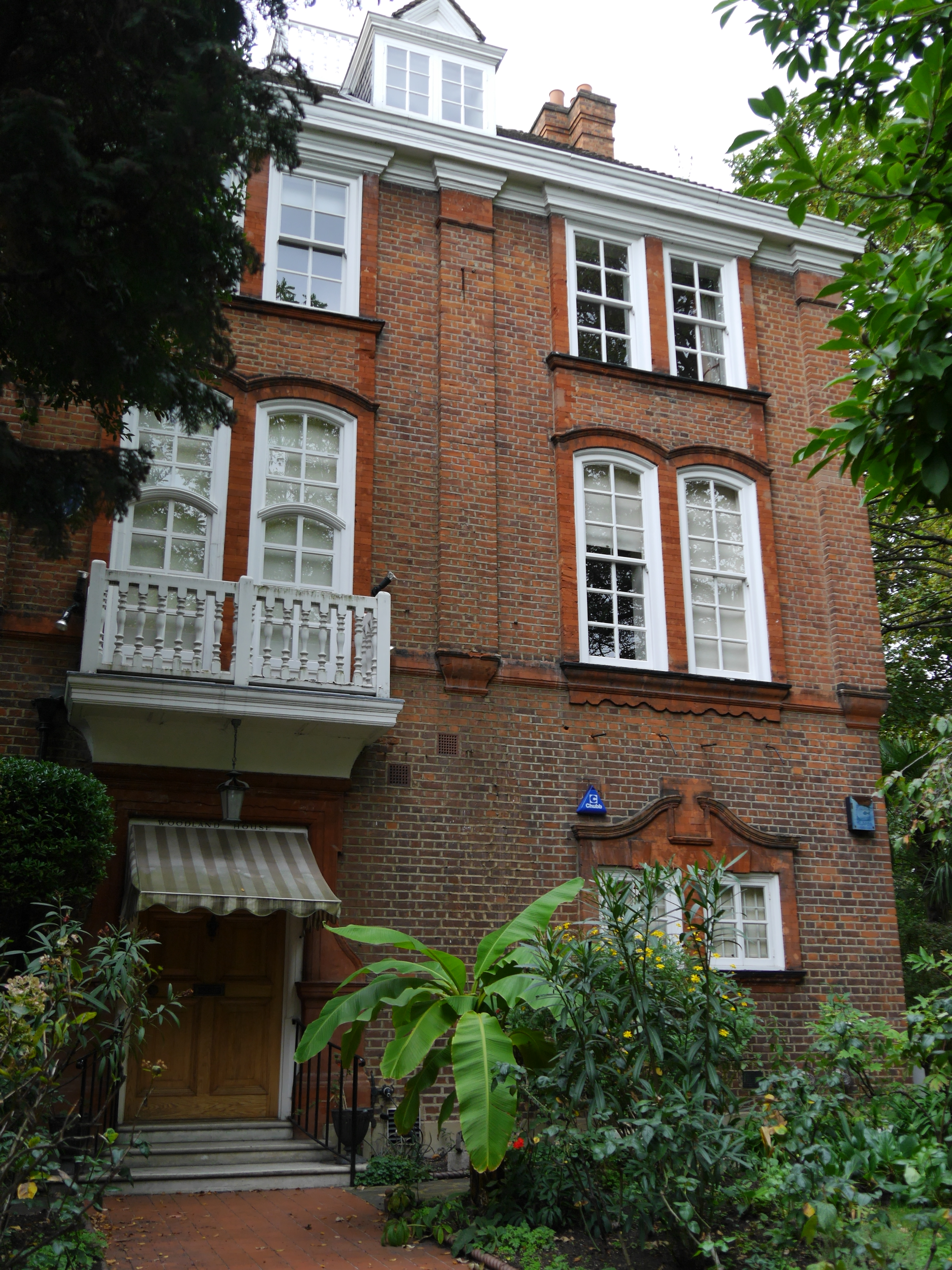
Woodland House

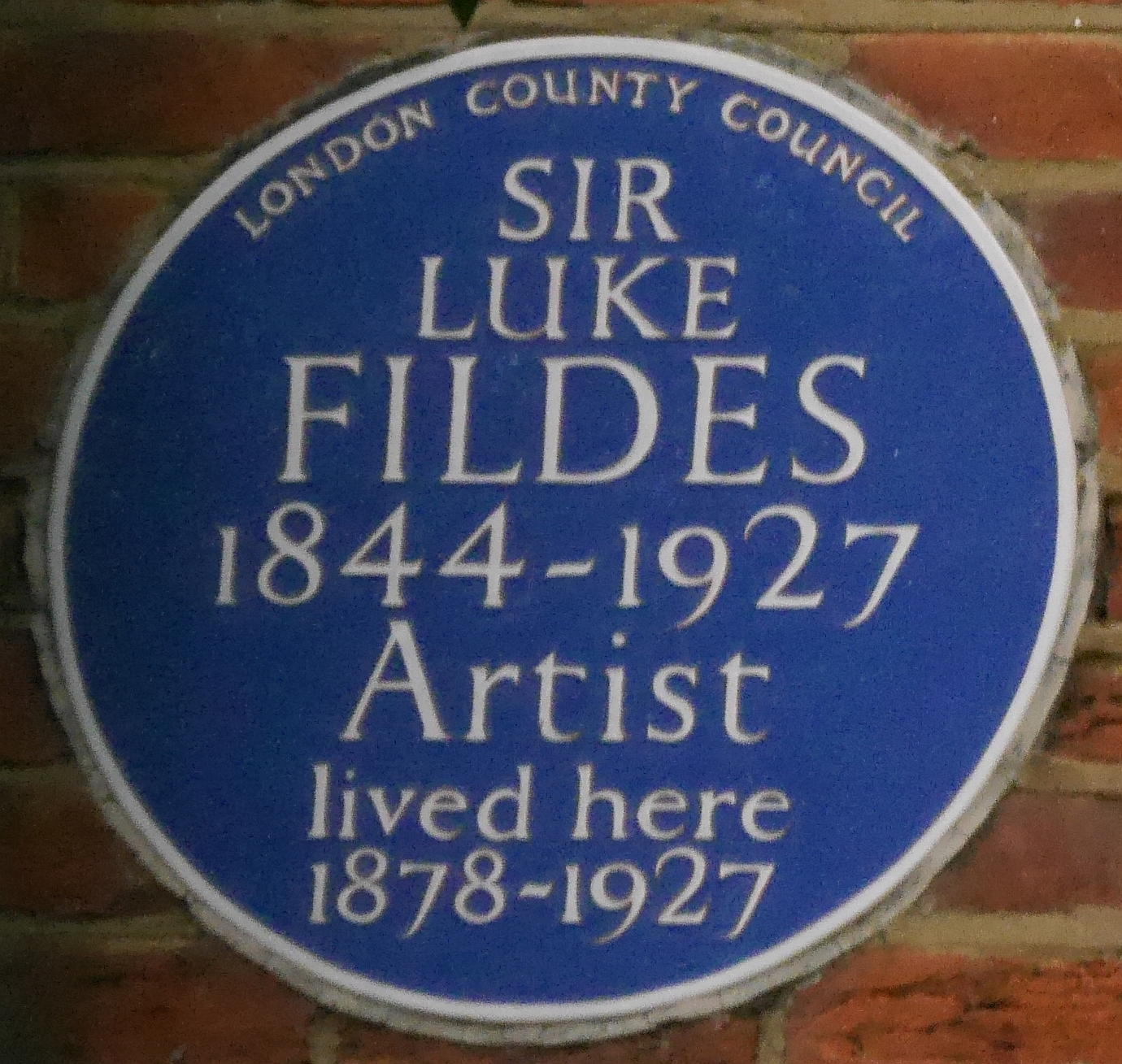
Blue plaque at Woodland House (placing his birth year one year later)
