= Robin Fildes =

Australian rules footballer

Personal information
- Full name: Robin Fildes
- Born: 13 November 1940 (age 85)
- Original team: Mentone Grammar
- Height: 187 cm (6 ft 2 in)
- Weight: 85.5 kg (188 lb)

Playing career^{1}
Years	Club	Games (Goals)
1961–63	Collingwood	14 (2)
- ^{1} Playing statistics correct to the end of 1963.

Robin Fildes is a former Australian rules footballer who played with Collingwood in the Victorian Football League (VFL).
