= Boat Trip =

Boat Trip or Boat trip may refer to:

- Boat Trip, 2008 Sun Araw album
- Boat Trip (film), a 2002 romantic comedy film
- Boat tour, a short trip in a small boat
- Cruising (maritime), trips of a few days or more on a boat
- A voyage on a cruise ship, ocean liner, ferry or any other maritime passenger vessel
