= Luke Fildes (fencer) =

British fencer (1879–1970)

Personal information
- Full name: Frederick Luke Val Fildes
- Born: 13 June 1879 Kensington, London, England
- Died: 22 April 1970 (aged 90) Kensington, London, England

Sport
- Sport: Fencing

Frederick Luke Val Fildes (13 June 1879 – 22 April 1970) was a British fencer, solicitor and company secretary. He competed in the individual épée event at the 1908 Summer Olympics.

== Biography ==
Fildes was born on 13 June 1879 in London, the son of Sir Luke Fildes, and the great grandson of Mary Fildes. He was named Val after his godfather, the painter Val Prinsep. He was educated at Marlborough College and Trinity College, Cambridge. He practised as chartered accountant and solicitor until the start of World War I. He served with the Coldstream Guards but after being wounded on the Somme he became superintendent of physical and bayonet training at the Aldershot Command. After the war he went into business rather than return to law and became secretary of Lever Brothers Limited.

In 1929, he won the épée title at the British Fencing Championships. He retired from Lever Brothers in 1946. Between 1934 and 1967 he was a trustee of the Lady Lever Art Gallery and Collections at Port Sunlight.

In 1968, as L. V. Fildes, he wrote a biography of his father "Luke Fildes R.A. A Victorian Painter" published in London by Michael Joseph. It is based partly on his father's correspondence and the diary of his maternal uncle Henry Woods R.A., who lived and painted in Venice. In the biography he says remarkably little about himself, except that at Easter, 1914, holidaying with his parents at Lenno on Lake Como, they met the sculptor William Goscombe John, also on holiday with his family. Luke Val married Goscombe John's daughter Muriel eighteen months later in 1915.
