= Mary Fildes =

British reformer (c. 1789–1876)

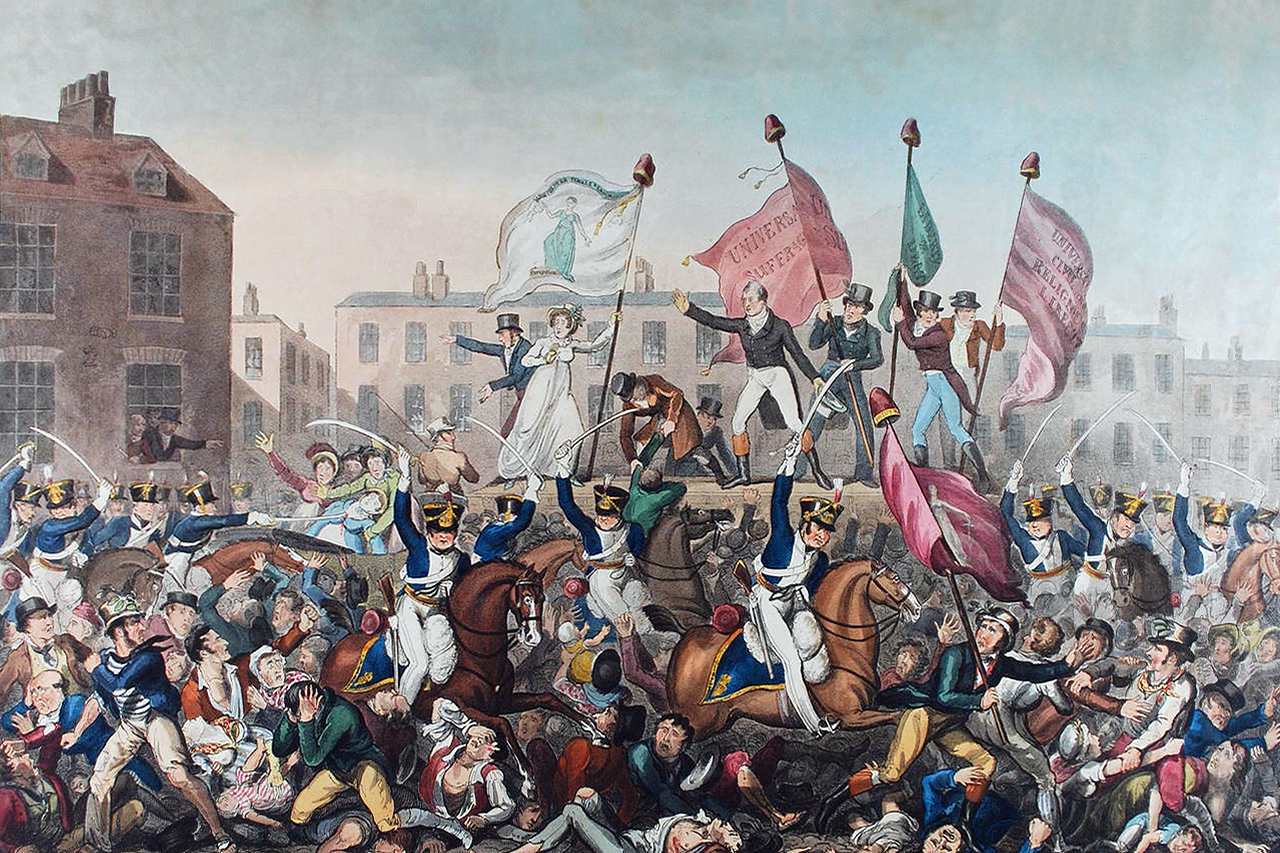
- Print of the Peterloo massacre published by Richard Carlile 1819
- Born: Mary Pritchard between 1789 and 1792; Cork, Ireland
- Died: 1876; Manchester, England, United Kingdom of Great Britain and Ireland
- Occupation: Female reformer
- Years active: 1819–1843
- Known for: President of The Manchester Female Reform Society
- Spouse: William Fildes
- Relatives: Luke Fildes (grandson); Luke Fildes (great-grandson)

Mary Fildes (c. 1789–1876) was a British social reformer and political activist. She was president of the Manchester Female Reform Society in 1819, and played a leading role at the mass rally at Manchester in that year which ended in the Peterloo massacre. She was also the grandmother of the artist Luke Fildes through her son James.

== Family ==
Born Mary Pritchard in Cork, Ireland, between 1789 and 1792, she came from a family of Manchester grocers. Her known family connections were Welsh rather than Irish, so her parents may simply have been visiting Ireland. She married William Fildes, a reed maker, on 18 March 1808 in Stockport, England. They had eight children: James (b. 1808; father of Luke Fildes), Samuel (b. 1809), George (b. 1810), Robert (b. 1815), Sarah (b. 1816), Thomas Paine (b. 1818), Henry Hunt (b. 1819), and John Cartwright (b. 1821).

Mary named her younger children after some of the notable political figures of the day: John Cartwright, Thomas Paine and Henry Hunt.

== Peterloo Massacre ==
In 1819 on 16 August, a vast orderly concourse of working men and women assembled on St. Peter's field, then on the outskirts Manchester. A group of Manchester female reformers processed in with the carriage of the speaker, Henry Hunt, Mary riding at the front of the carriage waving a flag. She mounted the platform and stood at the front with her flag, along with other female activists. Elizabeth Gaunt and Sarah Hargreaves sat in Hunt's carriage nearby. The London radical journalist Richard Carlile, who was present at the rally, described her as a heroic figure and gave her a prominent place in his print of the event, "To Henry Hunt Esquire."

The magistrates, fearing unrest, decided to arrest Hunt on the platform and sent for military support. The Manchester and Salford Yeomanry arrived first, and once Hunt had been arrested they attacked the platform and those around it, seizing and destroying flags and banners and causing panic. The regular troops arriving soon afterwards charged to clear the field, causing further casualties; the eventual toll was eighteen killed and nearly seven hundred seriously injured. (The two-year-old William Fildes who was killed on the outskirts of the meeting was no relation; Fildes was a common local name). Other female reformers including Hargreaves and Gaunt, apparently mistaken for Fildes, were beaten up, arrested, and detained for many days without charge. Fildes herself was knocked to the ground by the truncheon of a special constable who seized her flag, and narrowly escaped a swipe with a sabre. She escaped and lay low for a fortnight, possibly sheltered by her loyalist family in the northern quarter. Much later she got to know the Manchester novelist Isabella Banks, who included a further detail in her 1876 novel The Manchester Man: "Mrs. Fildes hanging suspended by a nail on the platform of the carriage had caught her white dress. She was slashed across her exposed body by an officer of the cavalry".

Fildes gave her own story in a petition to the House of Commons in May 1821.

== Later political life ==
Mary Fildes was a female reformer, but not a suffragette as is sometimes claimed. She did not (publicly, at least) advocate votes for women, but like most female reformers of her generation she believed that women should fight alongside men for a vote for all adult male householders, which could then be exercised in the interests of the whole family. When the republican and secularist followers of Richard Carlile split with the popular movement led Henry Hunt in 1822, Fildes sided with Hunt and, hurtfully, accused Carlile of having shown cowardice at Peterloo.

When the next year the London reformer Francis Place sent her a package of birth control propaganda to distribute, mistaking her for a midwife cousin of her husband's, she wrote 'as a woman, a wife, and a mother' to radical journals to denounce 'this infamous handbill'.

She remained a reformer, speaking at a meeting in Heywood, Lancashire, in 1833 to launch a branch of the Female Political Union, and giving lectures on 'War' at Chorlton near Manchester in 1843, both advertised in the radical press.

== Later years, and Luke Fildes ==
Mary Fildes' later years were relatively comfortable. By 1846, she was a widow living in Glasgow, possibly with relatives of her husband. In 1849, she inherited from her mother four houses in Chester, a county town on the Welsh borders, where she moved. There is no evidence that she became a pub landlady, but her house was at one time listed as a spirit vault, most likely indicating that the cellar was rented out to a distiller.

In 1854, she travelled to Liverpool, home of her indigent son James and his Irish wife, and brought her eleven-year-old grandson Luke Fildes to live with her in Chester. She was able to pay for him to attend classes at Warrington School of Art, setting him up to be one of Victorian England's most famous painters. She died of bronchitis in Manchester on 3 April 1876.
