= Reid & Sons =

Silversmith firm founded in 1788

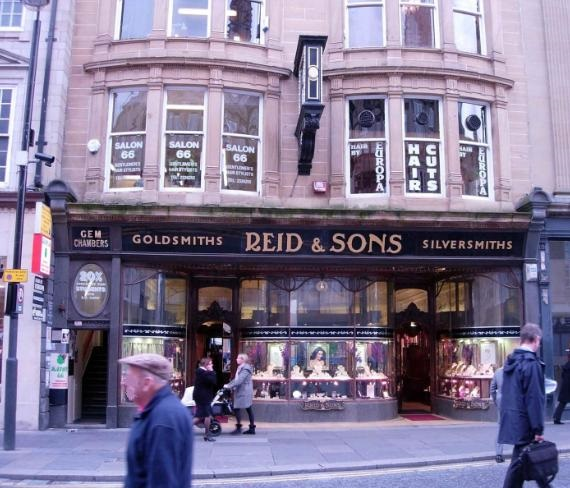
The premises of Reid & Sons on Blackett Street in Newcastle upon Tyne

Reid & Sons is a firm of silversmiths founded in Newcastle upon Tyne in 1788 by Christian Ker Reid and which continues to trade today as part of the 'Goldsmiths Group'. In 2013 Reid & Sons celebrated its 235th anniversary. Over the years the various branches of the company have been known as Christian Ker Reid; Reid & Son; Reid & Sons; Reid & Sons Ltd; Craddock & Reid; William Ker Reid and Edward Ker Reid.

== Establishment ==
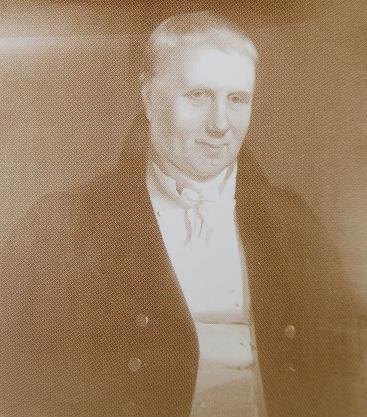
Christian Ker Reid (1756-1834)

The business was founded in Newcastle upon Tyne in 1788 by Christian Ker Reid (1756-1834) who was born in the Canongate in Edinburgh in 1756, the son of Andrew Reid, a brewer, and his wife Christian née Bruce. In 1769 aged 12 he was apprenticed to the Edinburgh silversmith William Davie, following which he gained a position with Langlands & Robertson as a journeyman silversmith. In 1778 Reid arrived in Newcastle from Edinburgh where he started his own company and making his first submissions to the Newcastle Assay Office in February 1791. He married Margaret Todd in Newcastle in 1781 but she died in 1783. In 1784 he married Mrs Margery Thomson née Forsdyce and with her had at least thirteen children. In 1818 the partnership of Christian Ker Reid and David Reid Snr. was registered but Christian Ker Reid continued to assay silverwork under his own mark until 1819. He died in 1834 following which his sons William Ker Reid (1787-1868), David Reid Snr. (1792-1869) and Christian Bruce Reid (1805-1889) ran the company.

The Reid family married into the Barnard family of silversmiths as brothers William Ker Reid and David Reid Snr. married sisters Mary and Elizabeth Barnard, the daughters of Edward Barnard Snr. who established Edward Barnard and Sons. William Ker Reid's marriage to Mary Barnard produced thirteen children, seven boys and six girls. In 1847 his son and heir Edward Ker Reid married his cousin Anna Barnard, daughter of John Barnard Snr.; they were both the grandchildren of Edward Barnard Snr.).

== Reid & Sons ==
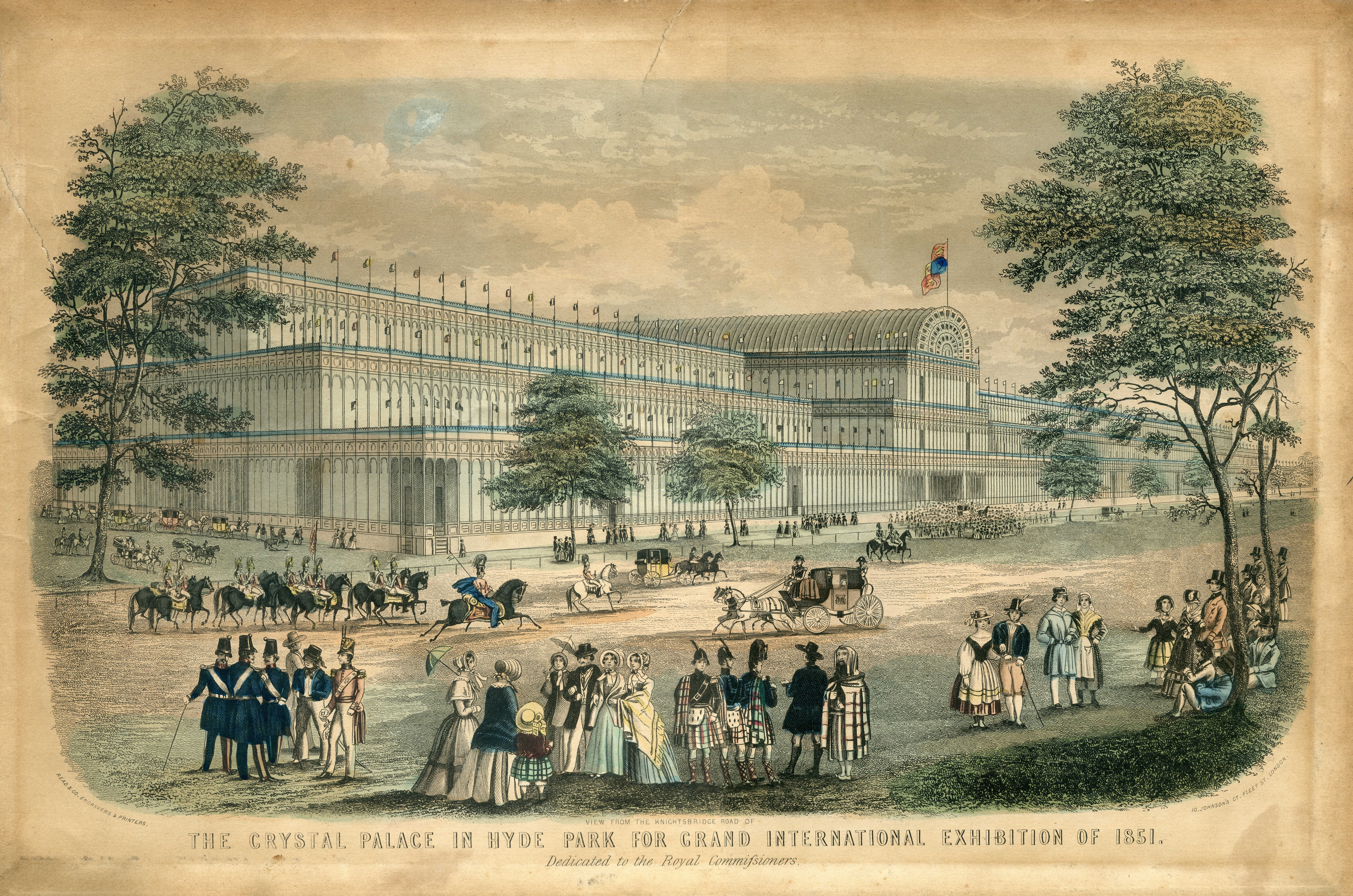
Reid & Sons exhibited at the Great Exhibition of 1851

In 1838 the company received a Royal Appointment from Queen Victoria. On the retirement of Christian Bruce Reid from the company in 1845 his two older brothers took Christian John Reid (1816-1891), son of David Reid Snr, as a partner in the company. The firm, known as Reid & Sons, operated from 12 Dean Street, 14 Grey Street (1843) and 41 Grey Street in Newcastle (1855) and exhibited at the Great Exhibition of 1851 and at the 1862 International Exhibition, again held in London. Between 1844 and 1898/9 Reid & Sons sent a number of marine chronometers for trial at Greenwich, coming second in 1844. On other occasions the company came third in the trials and did well enough for the Admiralty to buy a number of their chronometers. The Antarctic explorer Ernest Shackleton had a Reid & Sons chronometer. In 1858 William Ker Reid left the business having been an absent partner since 1812 when he had moved to London to set up his own company. On the death of David Reid Snr. in 1868 Christian John Reid ran the company with his brother David Reid Jr. (1832-1914, who retired from the company in 1882) and his sons Thomas Arthur Reid (1845-1910) and Walter Cecil Reid (1846-1933) in partnership with Francis James Langford at 41 Grey Street and 48 Grainger Street in Newcastle.

Christian Leopold Reid (1872-1924) joined the partnership on the retirement of Walter Cecil Reid. In 1909 the company relocated to Blackett Street in Newcastle under the co-management of Thomas Arthur Reid, Christian Leopold Reid and William Septimus Leete (1865-1930). In 1930 the firm was converted into a limited liability company with the name Reid & Sons Ltd. which in 1967 became a subsidiary of the Northern Goldsmiths Co Ltd, who were founded in Newcastle in 1892. The company has been part of the jewellery group Aurum Holdings since 2004, which is established as 'Goldsmiths' with about 160 shops across England and Northern Ireland. In 2013 Reid & Sons celebrated its 235th anniversary.

Among the company's most notable commissions are the FA Cup, the Rugby League Trophy and Ernest Shackleton's chronometer. A timepiece made for the Newcastle & Berwick Railway is in the collection of the Science Museum in London. Examples of their marine chronometers are held in the collection of the National Maritime Museum in Greenwich in London.

== William Ker Reid ==
Until 1858 William Ker Reid remained an absent partner in Reid & Sons in Newcastle. In 1812 he set up his own business in London when he went into partnership with Joseph Craddock to form Craddock & Reid. In 1814 Reid was made a Freeman of the Goldsmiths Company by Redemption and a Liveryman in 1818.

In 1825 William Ker Reid set up a new company without Craddock on Chancery Lane in London. In 1847 the firm became W.K. Reid & Son, with his son Edward Ker Reid (1821-1886) as a partner. In 1868 the firm was rocked by the deaths of David Reid and his brother William Ker Reid and his brother David Reid Snr. died within six days of each other in February 1868. Having been apprenticed as a silversmith to his father, Edward Ker Reid was made a Freeman of the Goldsmiths Company by Patrimony in 1842 and was made a Liveryman in 1848. By 1856 he was managing the company under his own name, while in 1874 the business relocated to Fleet Street in London where it remained until his death in 1886. His son, London-based silversmith William Lewis Reid (1858-1923), married and later divorced the militant suffragette and journalist Katharine Gatty (1870-1952). Their daughter Eve Lewis Reid was born in 1893.
