= Crown of England =

Crown of England may refer to:

- The Crown
- Crown Jewels of the United Kingdom
- Monarchy of the United Kingdom

== See also ==
- List of English monarchs
