= Imperial Crown of India =

Crown used by King George V as Emperor of India at the Delhi Durbar of 1911

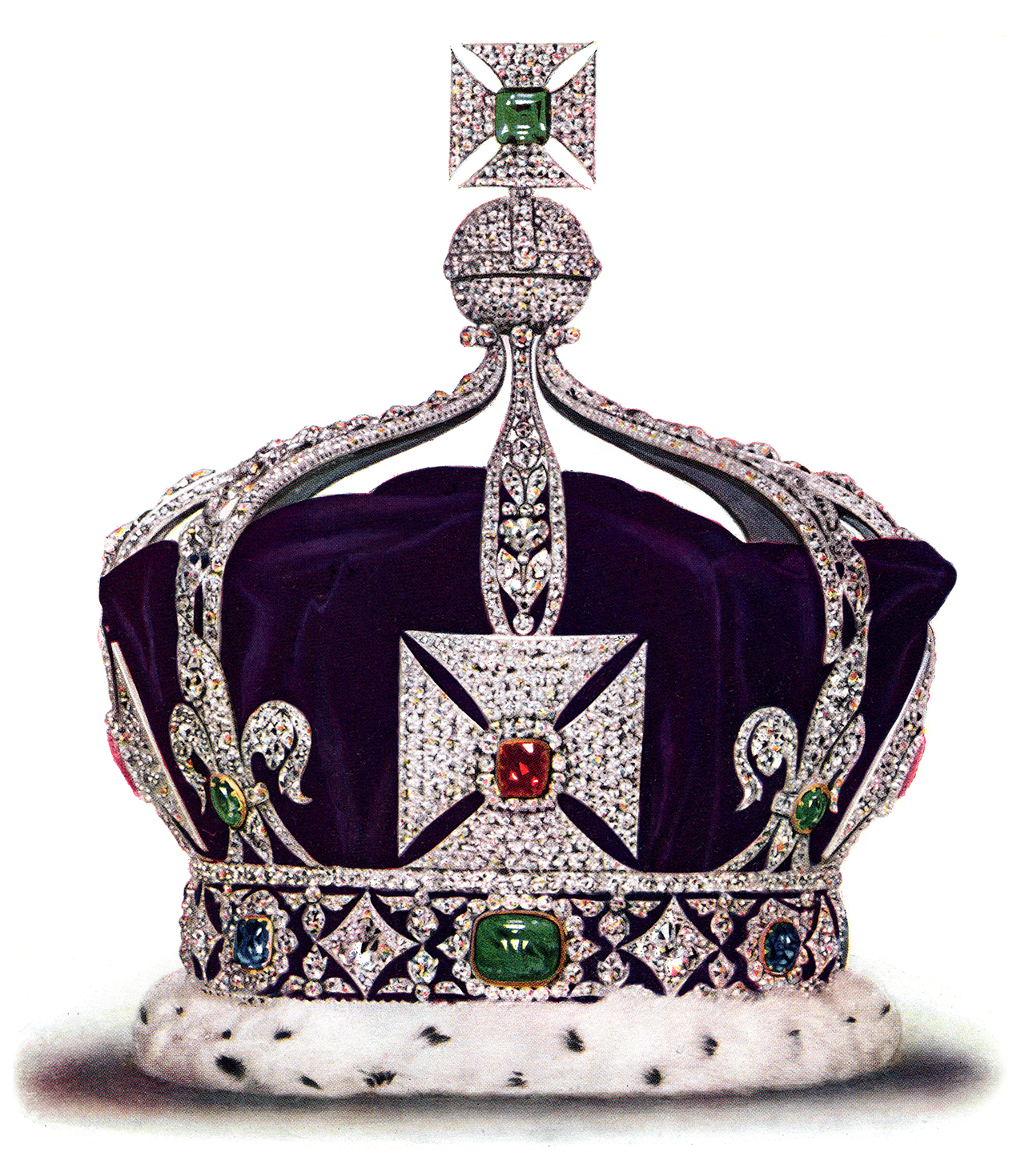
The Imperial Crown of India

The Imperial Crown of India is a hoop crown owned by the British monarch. Now part of the Crown Jewels of the United Kingdom, it was created for King George V in his capacity as Emperor of India for him to wear at the Delhi Durbar of 1911.

== Origin ==
Tradition prohibits the Crown Jewels from leaving the United Kingdom, a product of the days when kings and queens often pawned the jewels to foreign brokers. There are also considerable risks involved in transporting the historic regalia by sea and land over such a great distance. For these reasons, a new crown was made specially for King George V and Queen Mary's trip to India in 1911, where they were proclaimed as Emperor and Empress of India before the princes and rulers of India.

The Crown Jewellers at the time, Garrard & Co, made the crown at a cost of £60,000 (equivalent to £6,100,000 in 2025), which was borne by the India Office.

== Description ==
The Imperial Crown of India weighs 920 g (2.03 lb) and is set with 6,170 diamonds, 9 emeralds, 4 rubies, and 4 sapphires. At the front is a very fine emerald weighing 32 carats (6.4 g). The King wrote in his diary that it was heavy and uncomfortable to wear: "Rather tired after wearing my crown for 3 1/2 hours; it hurt my head, as it is pretty heavy."

Similar to other British crowns, it consists of a circlet with four crosses pattée and four fleurs-de-lis. However, the eight half-arches on top, which join at a typical monde and cross pattée, point upwards in the form of a Gothic ogee arch. The Crown of India is the only crown of a British sovereign to have eight half-arches, in the style of continental European crowns, departing from the tradition of British crowns having two arches or four half-arches.

== Use ==
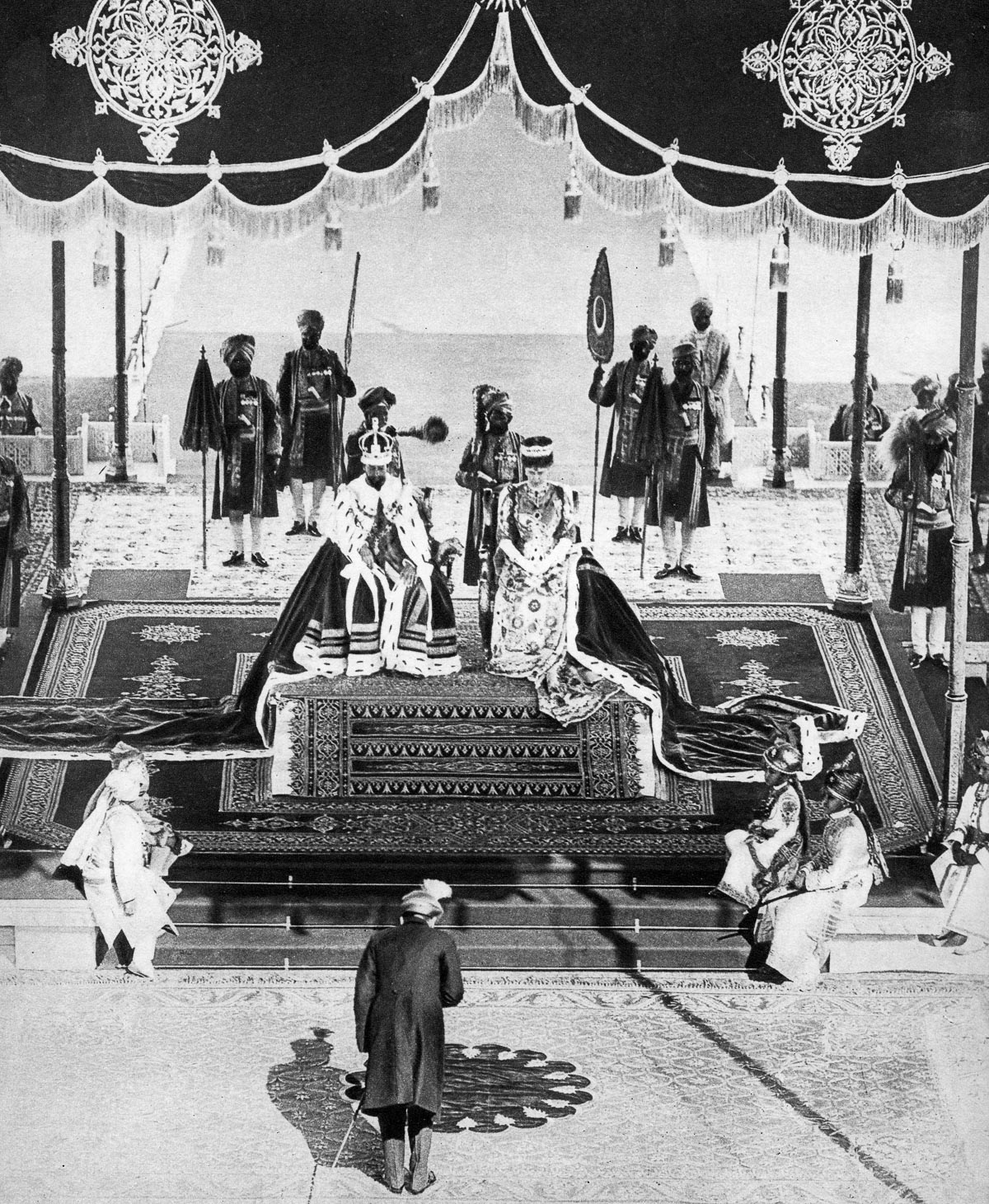
King George V and Queen Mary at the Delhi Durbar, December 1911.

George and Mary were not crowned as emperor and empress at the ceremony; the Archbishop of Canterbury, Randall Davidson, did not think it appropriate for a Christian service to take place in a country where the people were mostly Hindu or Muslim. Instead, the king simply wore the crown as he entered the durbar, and the durbar was styled as an affirmation of the king's coronation, which had already taken place in the United Kingdom six months earlier.

The crown has not been used since George V returned from India. On 15 August 1947, British rule over India ended and the Dominions of India and Pakistan came into being. George VI and his British Prime Minister, Clement Attlee, agreed that

as long as the two new Dominions remained in the Commonwealth, the crown should be retained among the Crown Jewels, but if at later date one or both were to secede it might be contended that, in view of the fact that it had been purchased out of Indian funds, the crown should be vested in some Indian authority".

The Imperial Crown of India is on public display in the Jewel House at the Tower of London.

== See also ==
- Imperial crown
