= Lily Font =

British royal baptismal font

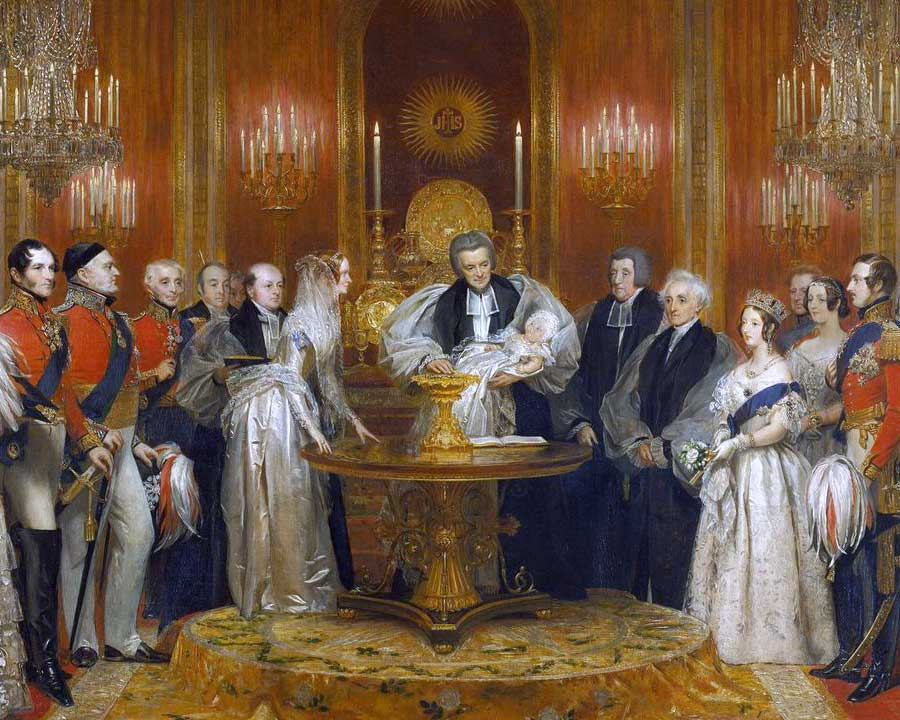
The Lily Font at the christening of Victoria, Princess Royal in 1841

The Lily Font is a silver-gilt baptismal font used at the baptismal services of members of the British royal family. It is part of the Royal Collection and is kept at the Jewel House at the Tower of London when not in use. The Lily Font has been used for the baptism of all the children and grandchildren of Queen Elizabeth II except Princess Eugenie of York.

== Design ==
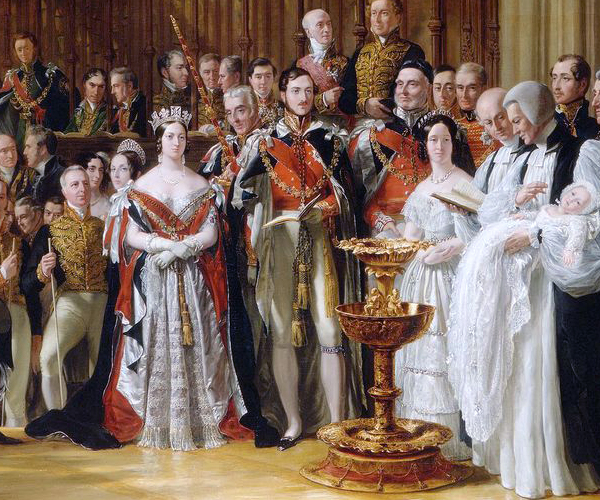
The Lily Font on top of the Charles II Font and Basin at the christening of Queen Victoria's eldest son, Albert Edward, Prince of Wales in 1842

The font was commissioned by Queen Victoria from the silversmiths Edward Barnard and Sons in 1840, for the baptism of her first child, Victoria, Princess Royal on 10 February 1841, her parents' first wedding anniversary. The font is made from silver-gilt that gives the appearance of gold. Three winged cherubs sit on the base of the font, sitting above the royal arms of Victoria, Prince Albert and the Princess Royal. Albert assisted with the design of the font. The cherubs are plucking lyres, above them leaves reach up to support the bowl that is edged by cascading water lilies. The Lily Font is used with the 1660 font and its basin or the Christening Ewer and Basin during baptismal ceremonies.

== Use ==
The Lily Font has been used for the baptism of all the children and grandchildren of Queen Elizabeth II except that of Princess Eugenie of York. Eugenie's baptism in 1990 was the first public baptism for a member of the British royal family.

The Lily Font was taken to St. Mary Magdalene Church, Sandringham for the baptism of Princess Charlotte of Cambridge in Norfolk in 2015. It was reported that this was the first time the font had left London in its history, though it had previously been kept in Windsor, from where it had been taken to London in 1926 for the baptism of Princess Elizabeth (later Queen Elizabeth II).

== See also ==
- Crown Jewels of the United Kingdom
