= Crown Jewels of the United Kingdom =

British royal regalia

Crown Jewels
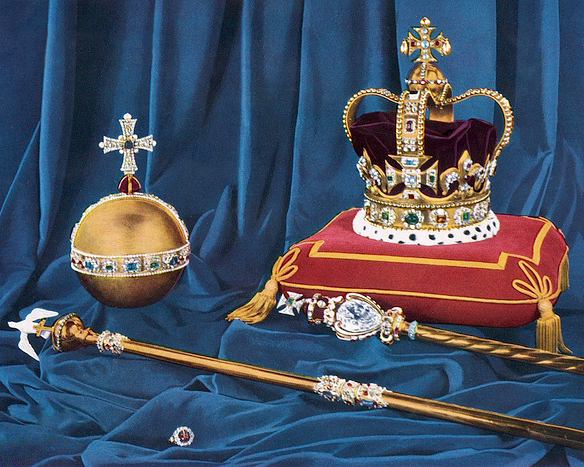
The principal coronation regalia
1	St Edward's Crown
2	Sovereign's Orb
3	Sceptre with Cross
4	Sceptre with Dove
5	Sovereign's Ring

Overview
- Country: United Kingdom
- Location: Tower of London (Note: Three maces from the Jewel House are on permanent loan to the Palace of Westminster. Objects can be temporarily moved to other exhibitions.)
- Size: ≈ 140 objects
- Oldest: Coronation Spoon (12th century)
- Newest: Charles III's stole (2023)
- Stones: ≈ 23,578 including Cullinan I, Cullinan II, Koh-i-Noor, Black Prince's Ruby, Stuart Sapphire, St Edward's Sapphire
- Owner: Charles III in right of the Crown
- Managers: Crown Jeweller; Royal Collection Trust; Historic Royal Palaces
- Website: hrp.org.uk; rct.uk

The Crown Jewels of the United Kingdom, originally the Crown Jewels of England, are a collection of royal ceremonial objects kept in the Jewel House at the Tower of London, which include the coronation regalia and vestments worn by British monarchs. (Note: Technically, the Crown Jewels are the regalia and vestments used or worn by monarchs at a coronation. However, the term has been commonly used to refer to the contents of the Jewel House since at least the 17th century. The inventory in Keay (2011) extends to items displayed in the Martin Tower.)

The coronation regalia are the only working set in Europe and the collection is the most historically complete of any royal regalia in the world. Objects used at the coronation ceremony variously denote the monarch's roles as head of state of the United Kingdom, Supreme Governor of the Church of England, and head of the British Armed Forces. The regalia feature heraldic devices and national emblems of England, Scotland, Wales, Northern Ireland, and other Commonwealth countries.

Use of regalia by monarchs in England can be traced back to when the country was converted to Christianity in the Early Middle Ages. A permanent set of coronation regalia, once belonging to Edward the Confessor, was established after he was made a saint in the 12th century. The sacred holy relics were kept at Westminster Abbey, venue of coronations since 1066, while monarchs wore another set of regalia at religious feasts and State Openings of Parliament. Collectively, these objects came to be known as the Jewels of the Crown. Most of the collection dates from around 1660 when Charles II ascended the throne. The medieval and Tudor regalia had either been sold or melted down after the monarchy was abolished in 1649 during the English Civil War. Only four original items predate the Restoration: a late 12th-century anointing spoon (the oldest object) and three early 17th-century swords. The regalia continued to be used by British monarchs after the kingdoms of England and Scotland united in 1707.

The regalia contain around 23,578 gemstones, among them Cullinan I (530 carats (106 g)), the largest clear cut diamond in the world, set in the Sovereign's Sceptre with Cross. It was cut from the largest gem-quality rough diamond ever found, the eponymous Cullinan, discovered in South Africa in 1905 and presented to Edward VII. In the Imperial State Crown are Cullinan II (317 carats (63 g)), the Stuart Sapphire, St Edward's Sapphire, and the Black Prince's Ruby – a large red spinel. The Koh-i-Noor diamond (105 carats (21 g)) was acquired by Queen Victoria from the Sikh Empire and has featured on three consort crowns. A small number of disused objects at the Tower have been emptied of their stones and some are set with glass or crystal replicas.

At a coronation, the monarch is anointed using holy oil poured from an ampulla into the spoon, invested with robes and ornaments, and crowned with St Edward's Crown. Afterwards, it is exchanged for the lighter Imperial State Crown, which is also usually worn at State Openings of Parliament. Wives of kings, known as queens consort, are invested with a plainer set of regalia. (Note: Husbands of queens regnant are not crowned in the United Kingdom.) Also regarded as crown jewels are state swords, trumpets, ceremonial maces, church plate, historical regalia, banqueting plate, and royal christening fonts. They are part of the Royal Collection and belong to the institution of monarchy, passing from one sovereign to the next. At the Tower of London they are seen by around 2.8 million visitors per year.

== History ==
=== Iron Age and Romans ===
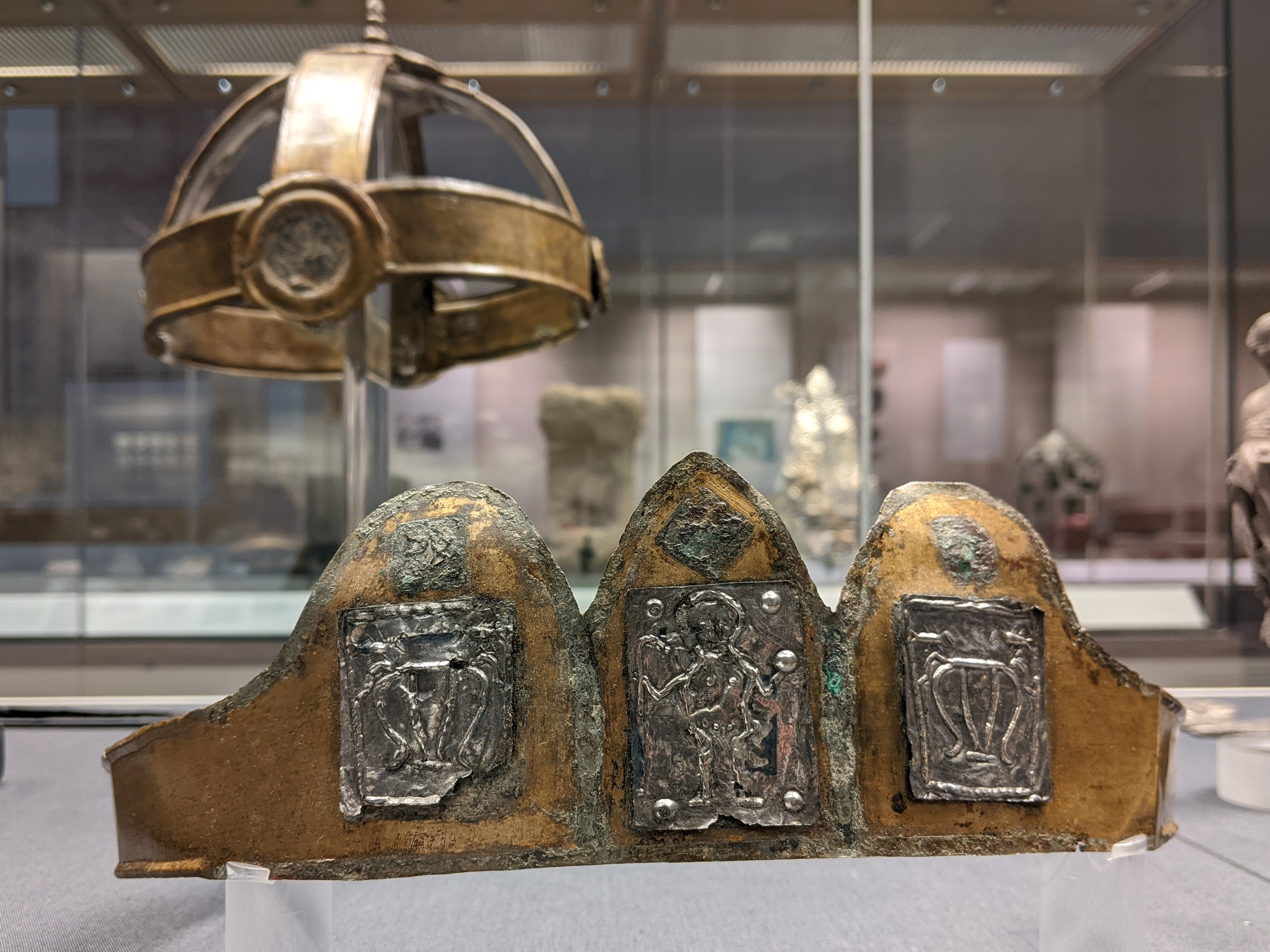
The Hockwold crown (upper left) and diadem in the British Museum

The earliest known use of a crown in Britain was discovered by archaeologists in 1988 in Deal, Kent, and dates to between 200 and 150 BC. A sword, brooch, ceremonial shield, and decorated bronze crown with a single arch, (Note: British Museum number 1990,0102.24) which sat directly on the head of its wearer, were found inside the tomb of the Deal Warrior. During the Iron Age, crowns were symbols of religious and military authority. Priests continued to wear crowns following the Roman conquest of Britain in 43 AD. Excavations in the 1950s near a temple site in Hockwold cum Wilton, Norfolk, unearthed a bronze crown with two arches and depictions of male faces, (Note: British Museum number 1957,0207.15) as well as two bronze diadems, (Note: British Museum number 1956,1011.2) each with an adjustable headband and repoussé silver embellishments, dating from the Roman period. One diadem features a plaque in the centre depicting a man holding a sphere in his left hand and an object similar to a shepherd's crook in his right – analogues of the orb and sceptre, which evolved later as royal ornaments.

=== Anglo-Saxons ===
By the early 5th century, the Romans had withdrawn from Britain, and the Angles and the Saxons settled. A heptarchy of new kingdoms began to emerge. One method used by regional kings to solidify their authority was the use of ceremony and insignia. The tomb of an unknown king – evidence suggests Rædwald of East Anglia (r. circa 599 – 624) – at Sutton Hoo illustrates the regalia of a pre-Christian Anglo-Saxon monarch. Inside the early 7th-century tomb, discovered in 1939, was found the ornate Sutton Hoo helmet, consisting of an iron cap, a neck guard, and a face mask decorated with copper alloy images of animals and warriors set with garnets. He was also buried with a decorated sword; a ceremonial shield; and a heavy whetstone sceptre, (Note: British Museum number 1939,1010.160) on top of which is an iron ring surmounted by the figure of a stag.

In 597, Pope Gregory I sent a mission led by the Benedictine monk Augustine to start the process of converting Pagan England to Christianity. After landing in the Kingdom of Kent, Augustine became the first Archbishop of Canterbury, and within two centuries the ritual of anointing new monarchs with holy oil and crowning them (initially with helmets) in a Christian ceremony had spread throughout the various neighbouring kingdoms. There was still no permanent set of coronation regalia; a new set was made for each monarch, with which they were buried upon death. In 9th-century Europe, gold crowns in the Byzantine tradition were replacing bronze, and gold soon became the standard metal for English royal crowns.

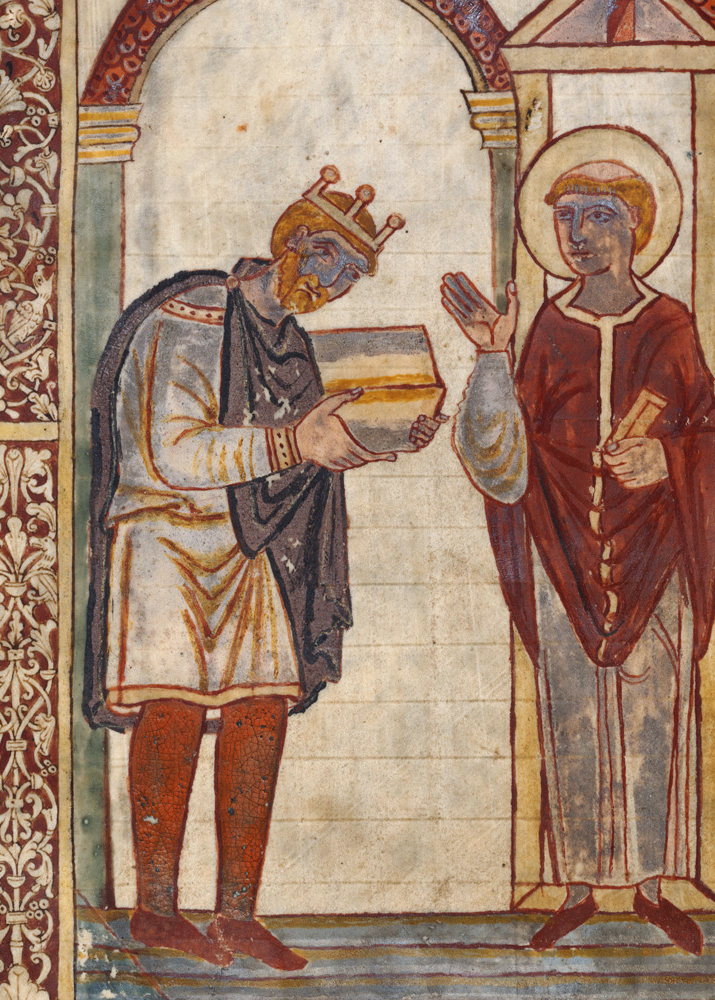
King Æthelstan presenting an illuminated manuscript to St Cuthbert, c. 930

King Æthelstan (r. 924–939) united the Anglo-Saxon realms to form the Kingdom of England. In the earliest known depiction of an English king wearing a crown he is shown presenting a copy of Bede's Life of St Cuthbert to the saint himself. Until his reign, kings were portrayed on coins wearing helmets and circlets, or wreath-like diadems in the style of Roman emperor Constantine the Great. Whether they actually wore such an item is not known. Edgar the Peaceful (r. 959–975) was the first English king to be crowned with an actual crown, and a sceptre was also introduced for his coronation. After crowns, sceptres were the most potent symbols of royal authority in medieval England.

Edward the Confessor (r. 1042–1066) is depicted wearing a crown and holding a sceptre in the first scene of the Bayeux Tapestry. Edward is thought to be the first English king to wear a crown with arches. Known as a 'closed' or imperial crown, the arches symbolised the king as an emperor of his own domain, subservient to no one but God, unlike some continental European rulers, who owed fealty to more powerful kings or the Holy Roman emperor. Few descriptions of the original crown survive, although one 17th-century historian noted it was "ancient Work with Flowers, adorn'd with Stones of somewhat a plain setting", and an inventory described it as "gold wire-work set with slight stones and two little bells", weighing 2.25 kilograms (79.5 oz).

=== Normans ===
William the Conqueror emerged as the first Norman king of England following his victory over the English at the Battle of Hastings. Wearing a crown became an important part of William I's efforts to assert authority over his new territory and subjects. At his death in 1087, the Anglo-Saxon Chronicle reported: "[William] kept great state … He wore his crown three times a year as often as he was in England … He was so stern and relentless … we must not forget the good order he kept in the land". The crown-wearings took place at feasts held on Christmas Day in Gloucester, Easter Day in Winchester, and Whitsun in Westminster, where the Archbishop or another high-ranking member of the clergy placed the crown on William's head before the royal council.

=== Plantagenets ===
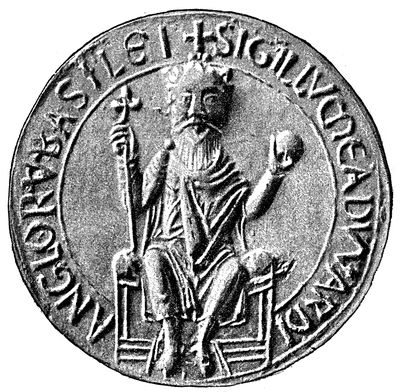
The first great seal of Edward the Confessor shows him wearing a crown and holding an orb and sceptre

In 1161, during the early years of the House of Plantagenet, the Anglo-Saxon king Edward the Confessor was made a saint, and objects connected with his reign became holy relics. The monks at his burial place, Westminster Abbey, claimed that Edward had asked them to look after his regalia in perpetuity and they were to be used at the coronation of all future kings. A note to this effect is contained in an inventory of precious relics drawn up by a monk at the abbey in 1450, recording a tunicle, dalmatic, pallium, and other vestments; a gold sceptre, two rods, a gold crown, comb, and spoon; a crown and two rods for the queen's coronation; and a chalice of onyx stone and a paten made of gold for the Holy Communion. Although the Abbey's claim is likely to have been an exercise in self-promotion, and some of the regalia had probably been taken from Edward's grave when he was reinterred there, it became accepted as fact, thereby establishing the first known set of hereditary coronation regalia in Europe. In the following centuries, some of these objects would fall out of use and the regalia would expand to include many others used or worn by monarchs and queens consort at coronations.

In 1216, King John of England supposedly lost some of his jewels and plate after his baggage train was swamped by an incoming tide during the First Barons War. Whether any coronation regalia were among his lost treasures is undetermined. An object referred to as "St Edward's Crown" is first recorded as having been used for the coronation of John's eldest son Henry III (r. 1216–1272) and appears to be the same crown worn by Edward. Being crowned and invested with regalia owned by a previous monarch who was also a saint reinforced the king's legitimacy. The crown would be used in many subsequent coronations until its destruction in the 1600s. Also in the Royal Collection was an item called a state crown, which together with other crowns, rings, and swords, constituted the monarch's state regalia that were kept separate from the coronation regalia, mainly at royal palaces.

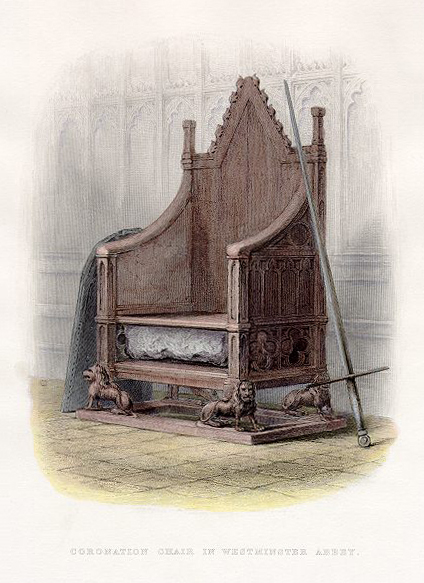
The Stone of Scone in the Coronation Chair at Westminster Abbey, 1859

The handing over of crowns symbolised the transfer of power between rulers. Following the defeat in 1282 of the Welsh prince Llewelyn ap Gruffydd by Edward I (r. 1272–1307), the Welsh regalia, including the crown of the legendary King Arthur, were surrendered to England. According to the Chronicle of Aberconwy Abbey, "and so the glory of Wales and the Welsh was handed over to the kings of England". After the invasion of Scotland in 1296, the Stone of Scone was sent to the Tower of London "in recognition of a kingdom surrendered and conquered". It was fitted into a wooden chair, which came to be used for the investiture of English kings and known as the Coronation Chair. The Scottish regalia were also taken to London and offered at the shrine of Edward the Confessor; Scotland eventually regained its independence. In the treasury of Edward II (r. 1307–1327) there were no fewer than 10 crowns. When Richard II (r. 1377–1399) was forced to abdicate, he symbolically handed St Edward's Crown over to his successor with the words "I present and give to you this crown … and all the rights dependent on it".

Monarchs often pledged items of state regalia as collateral for loans. Edward III (r. 1327–1377) pawned his magna corona to Baldwin of Luxembourg in 1339 for more than £16,650, equivalent to £22,572,528 in 2025. Three crowns and other jewels were held by the Bishop of London and the Earl of Arundel in the 1370s as security for £10,000 (equivalent to £5,844,000 in 2025). One crown was exchanged with the Corporation of London in 1386 for a loan of £4,000 (equivalent to £3,889,000 in 2025. Mayors, knights, peers, bankers, and other wealthy subjects sometimes released objects on a temporary basis for the royal family to use at state occasions. Monarchs also distributed plate and jewels to troops in lieu of money.

In the 14th century, all of the state regalia were moved to the White Tower at the Tower of London owing to a series of successful and attempted thefts in Westminster Abbey. (Note: Thomas Frederick Tout gives an illuminating second-hand account of one such theft in A Mediæval Burglary (1916).) The holy relics of the coronation regalia stayed behind intact at the Abbey. Having fallen out of use in England in the 13th century, two arches topped with a monde and cross reappeared on the state crown during the reign of Henry V (r. 1413–1422), though arches did not feature on the Great Seal again until 1471.

=== Tudors and early Stuarts ===
The traditions established in the medieval period continued later. By the mid 15th century, a crown was formally worn on six religious feasts every year: Christmas, Epiphany, Easter, Whitsun, All Saints' Day, and one or both feasts of St Edward. A crown was displayed and worn at the annual State Opening of Parliament. Also around this time, three swords – symbols of kingship since ancient times – were being used in the coronation ceremony to represent the king's powers in the administration of justice: the Sword of Spiritual Justice, the Sword of Temporal Justice, and the blunt Sword of Mercy.

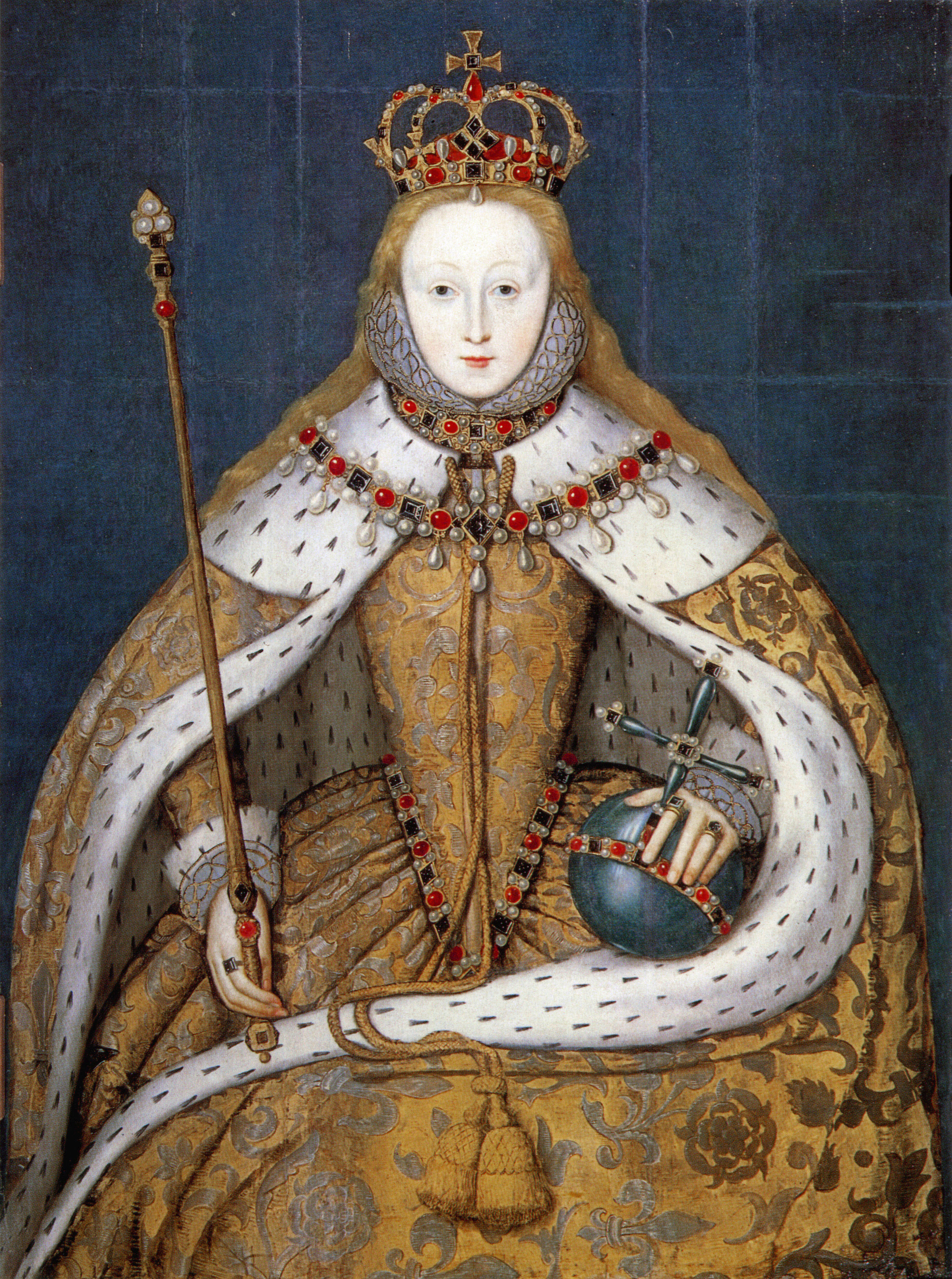
Elizabeth I (r. 1558–1603), the last Tudor monarch, in her coronation robes

An emerging item of regalia was the orb, described in Tudor inventories as a gold ball with a cross, which underlined the monarch's sovereignty. Orbs had been pictorial emblems of royal authority in England since the early Middle Ages, but a real orb was probably not used at any English coronation until Henry VIII (r. 1509–1547). State regalia increasingly passed from one monarch to the next. The best example of this was the Tudor Crown, probably created at the beginning of the Tudor dynasty. It first appears in a royal inventory during Henry VIII's reign and was one of three used at the coronation of each of his next three successors, the other two being St Edward's Crown and a "rich crown" made specially for the new monarch. After the English Reformation, when England broke away from the authority of the Roman Catholic Church, the Church of England denounced the veneration of medieval relics and downplayed the history of St Edward's regalia.

The concept of hereditary state regalia was enshrined in English law in 1606 when James I (r. 1603–1625), the first Stuart king to rule England, decreed a list of "Roiall and Princely ornaments and Jewells to be indyvidually [sic] and inseparably for ever hereafter annexed to the Kingdome of this Realme". (Note: For the schedule of royal jewels see Nichols, John (1828), The Progresses, etc. of King James the First, vol. 2, p. 45.) After James died, his son, Charles I (r. 1625–1649) ascended the throne. Desperate for money, one of his first acts was to load 41 masterpieces from the Jewel House onto a ship bound for Amsterdam – the hub of Europe's jewel trade. This hoard of unique treasures, including the Mirror of Great Britain brooch, a 14th-century pendant called the Three Brothers, a 4.7-kilogram (10 lb) gold salt cellar known as the Morris Dance, and much fine Elizabethan plate, was expected to swell the king's coffers by £300,000, but only £70,000 was realised. The Dutch proved reluctant to lend money on the jewels, considering that the English Parliament might declare the transactions invalid, as James had annexed the jewels to the crown and they were not Charles's personal property.

Charles's many conflicts with Parliament, stemming from his belief in the divine right of kings and the many religious conflicts that pervaded his reign, triggered the English Civil War in 1642. Parliament deemed the regalia "Jewels of the Crown": their ownership was vested in the monarch by virtue of his public role as king and not owned by him personally. To avoid any legal risk to his subjects, Charles asked his wife, Henrietta Maria, to smuggle the inalienable property of the Crown abroad and sell it on the Dutch jewellery market. Upon learning of the scheme, the House of Lords and House of Commons both declared anyone involved in trafficking the Crown Jewels to be enemies of the state. (Note: "An Order of the House concerning the Pawning of the Crown Jewels at Amsterdam" can be found in Rushworth, John (1721), Historical Collections, vol. 4, p. 736.) Henrietta succeeded in disposing of a small quantity of jewels, albeit at a heavy discount, and shipped munitions back to England for the royalist cause. Two years later, Parliament seized 187 kilograms (412 lb) of rare silver-gilt pieces from the Jewel House and used the proceeds to bankroll its own side of the war.

=== Interregnum ===
Charles I standing beside Henry VIII's Crown, 1631

After nine years of war, Charles was defeated and executed, and less than a week later, the Rump Parliament voted to abolish the monarchy. The newly created English Commonwealth found itself short of money. To raise funds, the Act for the Sale of the Goods and Personal Estate of the Late King, Queen and Prince was brought into law in 1649, and trustees were appointed to value the Jewels – then regarded by Oliver Cromwell as "symbolic of the detestable rule of kings" and "monuments of superstition and idolatry" – and sell them to the highest bidder. (Note: For the inventory see Millar, Oliver, ed. (1972). "The Inventories and Valuations of the King's Goods 1649–1651" in The Volume of the Walpole Society, vol. 43. pp. 20–51.) The most valuable object was Henry VIII's Crown, valued at £1,100 (equivalent to £166,900 in 2025. Their gemstones and pearls removed, most of the coronation and state regalia were melted down and struck into coins by the Mint.

Two nuptial crowns survived: the Crown of Margaret of York and the Crown of Princess Blanche had been taken out of England centuries before the Civil War when Margaret and Blanche married kings in continental Europe. Both crowns and the 9th-century Alfred Jewel give a sense of the character of royal jewellery in England in the Middle Ages. Another rare survivor is the 600-year-old Crystal Sceptre, a gift from Henry V to the Lord Mayor of London, who still bears it at coronations. (Note: The Lord Mayor of London carried the Crystal Sceptre at the coronation of Charles III.) Many pieces of English plate that monarchs had presented to visiting dignitaries before the interregnum can be seen in museums throughout Europe. Cromwell declined Parliament's invitations to be made king and became Lord Protector. It was marked by a ceremony in Westminster Hall in 1657 where he donned purple robes, sat on the Coronation Chair, and was invested with many traditional symbols of sovereignty, except a crown. A crown—probably made of gilded base metal—was placed beside Cromwell at his lying in state in 1660.

=== Restoration to present ===
The monarchy was restored after Cromwell's death. For the English coronation of Charles II (r. 1660–1685), who returned from exile abroad, new Jewels were made based on records of the lost items. They were supplied by the banker and royal goldsmith, (Note: Vyner outsourced work to fellow members of the Goldsmiths' Company.) Sir Robert Vyner, at a cost of £12,184 7s 2d – as much as three warships. It was decided to fashion the replicas like the medieval regalia and to use the original names. These 22-carat gold objects, made in 1660 and 1661, form the nucleus of the Crown Jewels: St Edward's Crown, two sceptres, an orb, an ampulla, a pair of spurs, a pair of armills or bracelets, and a staff. A medieval silver-gilt anointing spoon and three early Stuart swords had survived and were returned to the Crown, and the Dutch ambassador arranged the return of extant jewels pawned in Holland. The king also spent £11,800 acquiring 2,270 kilograms (5,000 lb) of altar and banqueting plate, and received conciliatory gifts from English cities that were Parliamentarian strongholds during the civil war.

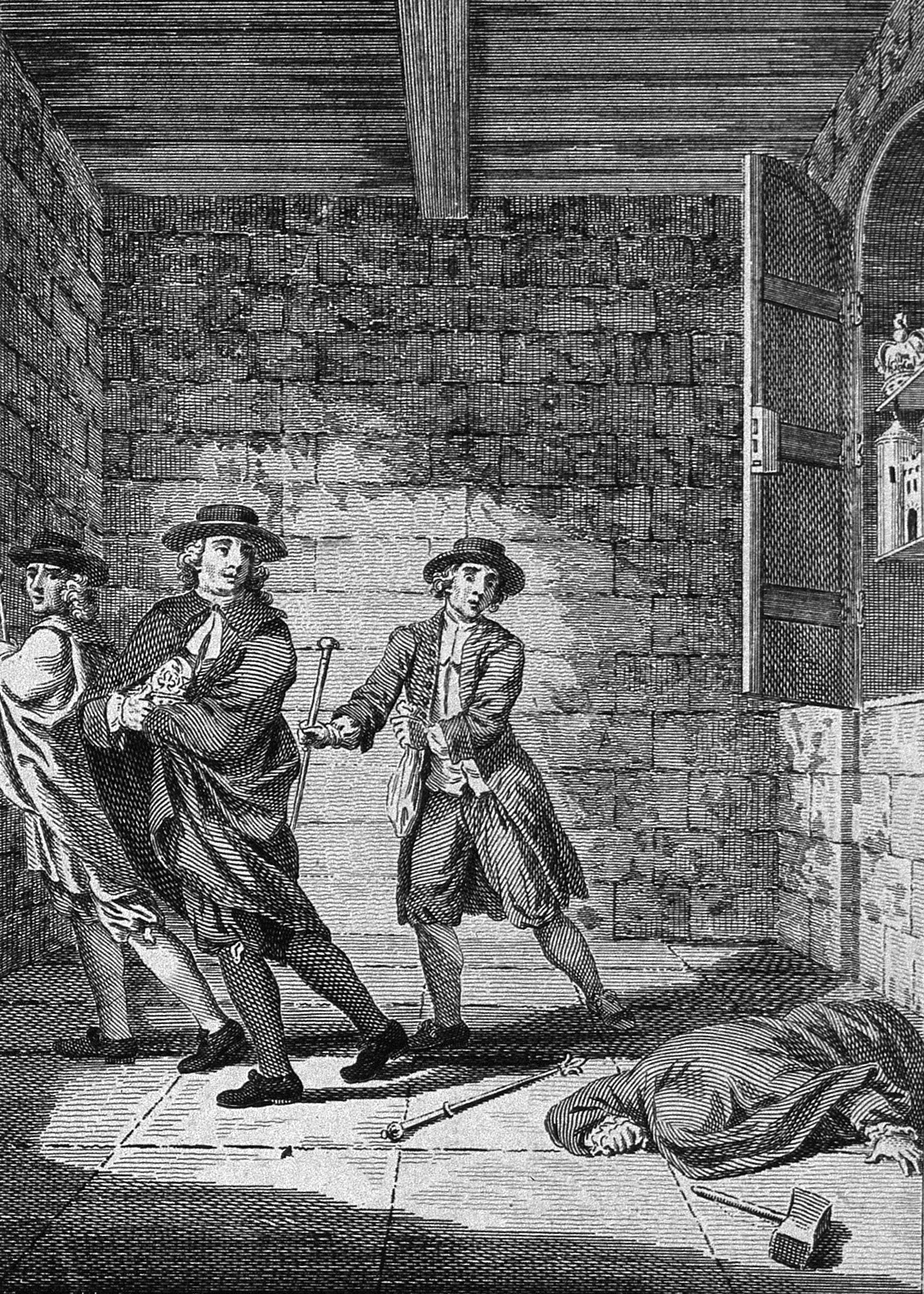
Thomas Blood and his accomplices attempting to steal the regalia, drawn 1793

In 1669, the Jewels went on public display for the first time in the Jewel House at the Tower of London. The Deputy Keeper of the Jewel House took the regalia out of a cupboard and showed it to visitors for a small fee. This informal arrangement was ended two years later when Thomas Blood, an Irish-born army officer loyal to Parliament, attacked the 77-year-old deputy and stole a crown, a sceptre, and an orb. Blood and his three accomplices were apprehended at the castle perimeter. The crown had been flattened with a mallet in an attempt to conceal it, and there was a dent in the orb. Blood was pardoned by the king, who also gave him land and a pension; it has been suggested that Blood was treated leniently because he was a government spy. Ever since, the Jewels have been protected by armed guards.

Since the Restoration, there have been many additions and alterations to the regalia. (Note: There is a list of additions and alterations up to Queen Victoria's 1838 coronation in Jones, pp. 63–72. For a timeline of changes between 1855 and 1967 see Holmes and Sitwell, pp. 76–78. A thorough history is contained in Blair, vol. 2.) A new set was commissioned in 1685 for Mary of Modena, the first queen consort to be crowned since the Restoration (Charles II was unmarried when he took the throne). Another, more elaborate set had to be made for Mary II (r. 1689–1694), who was crowned as joint sovereign with her husband William III (r. 1689–1702). After England and Scotland were united as one kingdom by the Acts of Union 1707, the Scottish regalia were locked away in a chest, and the English regalia continued to be used by British monarchs. Gemstones were hired for coronations – the fee typically being 4% of their value – and replaced with glass and crystals for display in the Jewel House, a practice that continued until the early 20th century.

As enemy planes targeted London during the Second World War, the Crown Jewels were secretly moved to Windsor Castle. The most valuable gemstones were taken out of their settings by James Mann, Master of the Armouries, and Sir Owen Morshead, the Royal Librarian. They were wrapped in cotton wool, placed in a tall glass preserving-jar, which was then sealed in a biscuit tin, and hidden in the castle's basement. Also placed in the jar was a note from the King, stating that he had personally directed that the gemstones be removed from their settings. As the Crown Jewels were bulky and thus difficult to transport without a vehicle, the idea was that if the Nazis invaded Britain, the historic precious stones could easily be carried on someone's person without drawing suspicion and, if necessary, buried or sunk.

After the war, the Jewels were kept in a vault at the Bank of England for two years while bomb damage to the Jewel House was being repaired. In May 2023, St Edward's Crown was placed on the head of Charles III (r. 2022–present) in the only ceremony of its kind in Europe. (Note: In 1937 and 1953 the coronation was rehearsed using a set of replicas made by Messrs Robert White and Sons. After 1953 the set was purchased jointly by the Abbey and the Ministry of Works, and it has been displayed in the Abbey's triforium since 2018.) Other European monarchies have abandoned coronations in favour of secular ceremonies. The Crown Jewels consist of approximately 140 objects, which are permanently set with around 23,578 precious and semi-precious stones, and are seen by around 2.8 million visitors per year.

== Crowns ==
Crowns are the main symbols of royal authority. All crowns in the Tower are decorated with alternating crosses pattée and fleurs-de-lis, a pattern which first appears on the great seal of Richard III, and their arches are surmounted with a monde and cross pattée. Most of the crowns also have a red or purple velvet cap and an ermine border.

=== St Edward's Crown ===
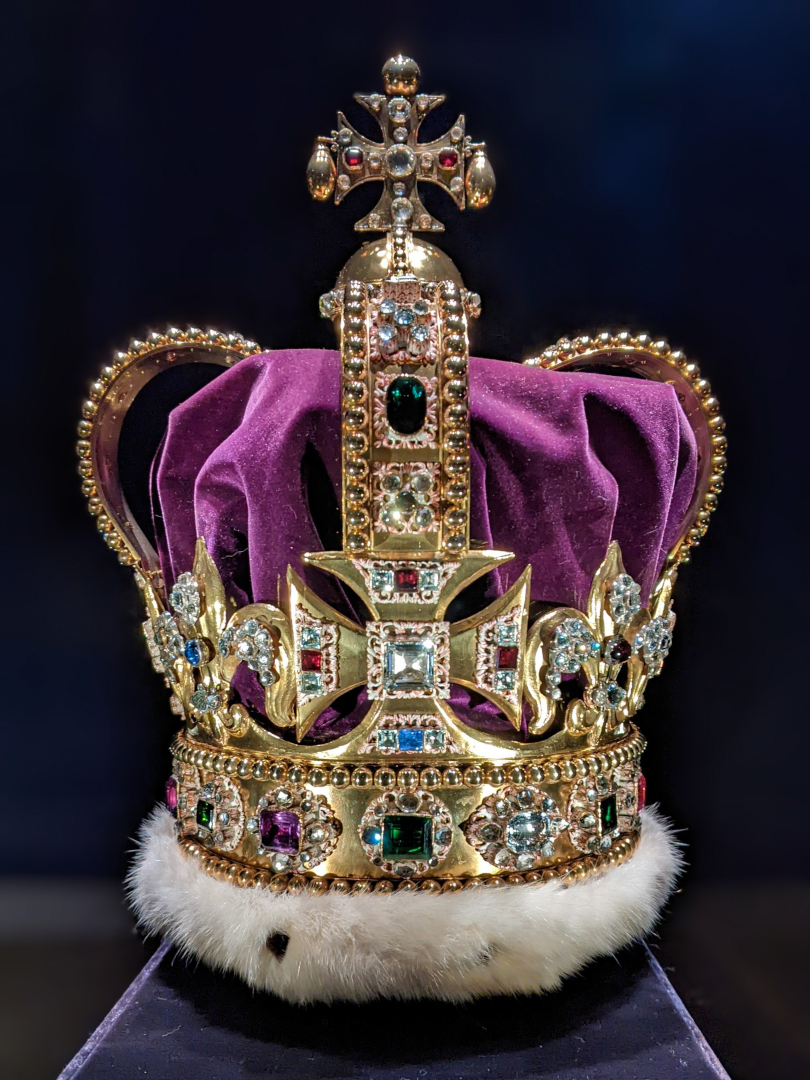
St Edward's Crown is the centrepiece of the British coronation regalia.

The centrepiece of the coronation regalia is named after Edward the Confessor and is placed on the monarch's head at the moment of crowning. Made of gold and completed in 1661, St Edward's Crown is embellished with 444 stones, including amethysts, garnets, peridots, rubies, sapphires, topazes, tourmalines and zircons. This coronation crown closely resembles the medieval one, with a heavy gold base and clusters of semi-precious stones, but the disproportionately large arches are a Baroque affectation. It was long assumed to be the original as their weight is almost identical and an invoice produced in 1661 was for the addition of gold to an existing crown. In 2008, new research found that it had actually been made in 1660 and was enhanced the following year when Parliament increased the budget for Charles II's twice-delayed coronation. The crown is 30 centimetres (11.8 in) tall and at a weight of 2.23 kg (4.9 lb) has been noted to be extremely heavy. After 1689, monarchs chose to be crowned with a lighter, bespoke coronation crown (e.g., that of George IV) or their state crown, while St Edward's Crown rested on the high altar. At Queen Victoria's coronation in 1838 it was entirely absent from the ceremony. The tradition of using St Edward's Crown was revived in 1911 by George V and has continued ever since. In 1953 Elizabeth II opted for a stylised image of this crown to be used on coats of arms, badges, logos and various other insignia in the Commonwealth realms to symbolise her royal authority, replacing the image of a Tudor-style crown adopted in 1901 by Edward VII. (Note: The Tudor Crown was reinstated in 2022 by Elizabeth's successor, Charles III.)

=== Imperial State Crown ===
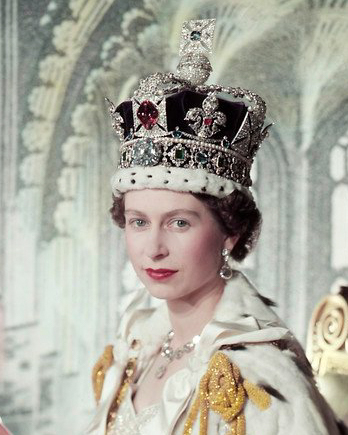
Elizabeth II wearing the Imperial State Crown on her Coronation Day, 1953

A much lighter crown is worn by the monarch when leaving Westminster Abbey, and at the annual State Opening of Parliament. The current Imperial State Crown was made in 1937 for George VI and is a copy of the one made in 1838 for Queen Victoria, which had fallen into a poor state of repair, and had been made using gems from its own predecessor, the State Crown of George I. In 1953, the crown was resized to fit Elizabeth II, and the arches were lowered by 2.5 cm (1 in). The gold, silver and platinum crown is decorated with 2,868 diamonds, 273 pearls, 17 sapphires, 11 emeralds and 5 rubies. Among the largest stones are the 317-carat (63 g) Cullinan II diamond, also known as the Second Star of Africa, added to the crown in 1909 (the larger Cullinan I is set in the Sovereign's Sceptre). The 170-carat (34 g) Black Prince's Ruby, set in the front cross, is not actually a ruby but a large cabochon red spinel. According to legend it was given to Edward the Black Prince by the Spanish king Peter of Castile in 1367 and Henry V wore it at the Battle of Agincourt. How the stone found its way back into the Royal Collection after the Interregnum is unclear, but a substantial "ruby" was acquired for the Crown Jewels in 1661 at a cost of £400 (equivalent to £65,000 in 2025), and this may well have been the spinel. On the back of the crown is the 104-carat (20.8 g) cabochon Stuart Sapphire, and in the top cross is St Edward's Sapphire, reputedly taken from the ring of the Confessor when his body was re-interred at the Abbey in 1163. Below the monde hang four pearls, three of which are often said to have belonged to Elizabeth I, but the association is almost certainly erroneous.

=== Consort crowns ===
After the Restoration, the wife of a king, known as a queen consort, traditionally wore the State Crown of Mary of Modena, who first wore it at her coronation in 1685. Originally set with 561 hired diamonds and 129 pearls, it was re-set with crystals and cultured pearls for display in the Jewel House along with a matching diadem that consorts wore in procession to the Abbey. The diadem once held 177 diamonds, 1 ruby, 1 sapphire, and 1 emerald. By the 19th century, that crown was judged to be too theatrical and in a poor state of repair, so in 1831 the Crown of Queen Adelaide was made for Adelaide of Saxe-Meiningen using gemstones from her private jewellery.

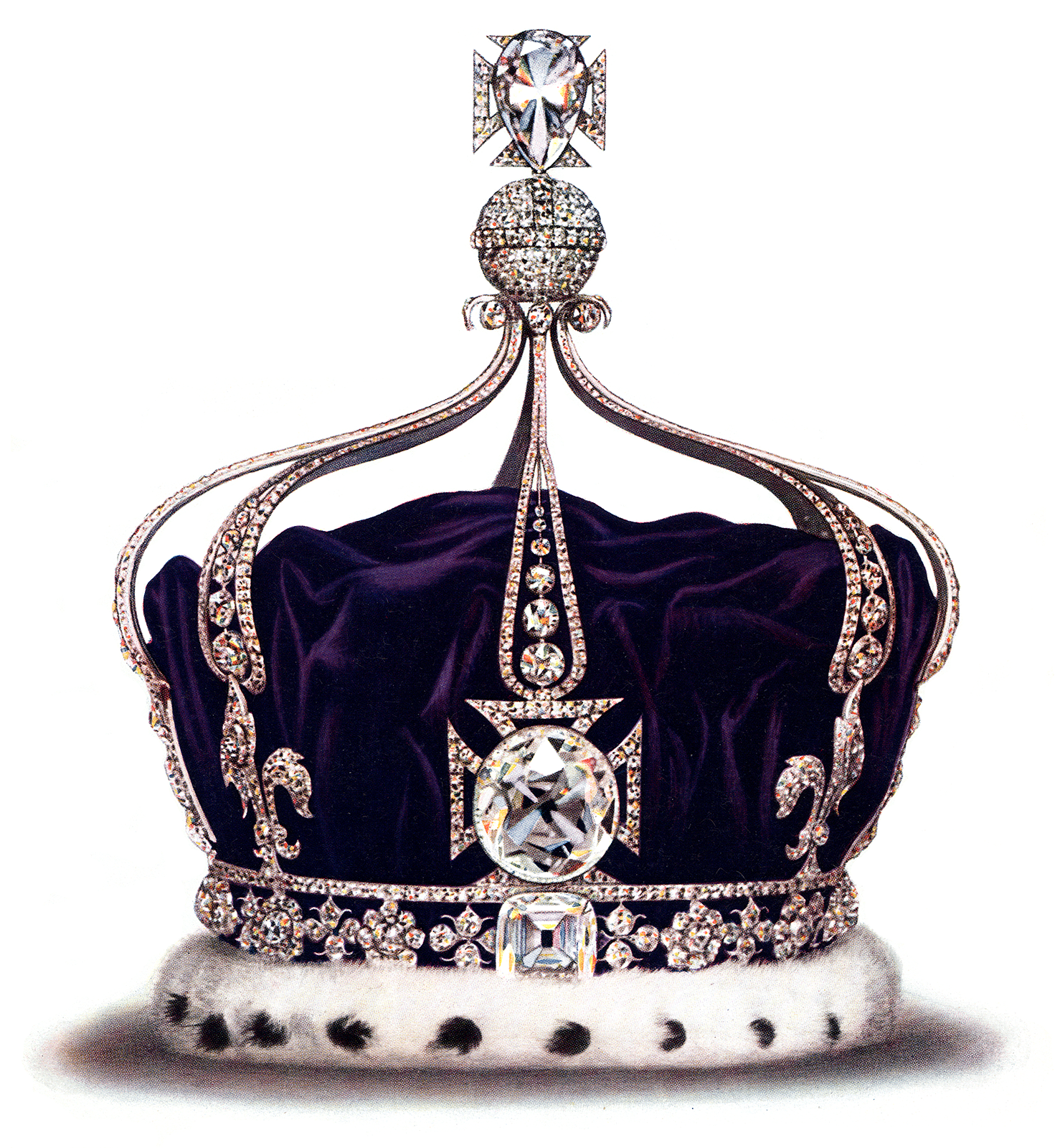
Hand-coloured photograph of the crown made for Queen Mary, with eight half-arches and the Koh-i-Noor set in the front cross, published 1919

Thus began a tradition of each queen consort having a custom-made crown. In 1902 the Crown of Queen Alexandra, a European-style crown – flatter and with eight half-arches instead of the typical four – was made for Alexandra of Denmark to wear at her coronation. Set with over 3,000 diamonds, it was the first consort crown to include the Koh-i-Noor diamond presented to Queen Victoria in 1850 following the British conquest of the Punjab. Originally 191 carats (38 g) and set in an armlet, it was cut down to an oval brilliant weighing 105 carats (21 g), which Victoria mounted in a brooch and circlet. The Crown of Queen Mary was the second to contain the Koh-i-Noor; also unusual for a British crown owing to its eight half-arches, it was made in 1911 for Mary of Teck. Mary purchased the Art Deco-inspired crown with her own money hoping it would become an heirloom used by future queens consort. Altogether, it was adorned with 2,200 diamonds, and contained the 94.4-carat (19 g) Cullinan III and 63.4-carat (13 g) Cullinan IV diamonds. Its arches were made detachable in 1914 allowing it to be worn as an open crown or circlet.

After George V's death, Mary continued wearing the crown (without its arches) as a queen mother, so the Crown of Queen Elizabeth was created for Elizabeth Bowes-Lyon, later known as the Queen Mother, to wear at her coronation in 1937. It is the only British crown made entirely out of platinum, and was modelled on Queen Mary's Crown, but has four half-arches instead of eight. The crown is decorated with about 2,800 diamonds, with the Koh-i-Noor in the middle of the front cross. It also contains a replica of the 22.5-carat (5 g) Lahore Diamond given to Queen Victoria by the East India Company in 1851, and a 17.3-carat (3 g) diamond given to her by Abdülmecid I, Sultan of the Ottoman Empire, in 1856. The crown was laid on top of the Queen Mother's coffin in 2002 during her lying in state and funeral. The crowns of Queen Alexandra and Queen Mary feature crystal replicas of the Koh-i-Noor, which has been the subject of repeated controversy, with governments of both India and Pakistan claiming to be the diamond's rightful owners and demanding its return ever since gaining independence from the UK.

Queen Camilla was crowned using Queen Mary's crown at her coronation with Charles III on 6 May 2023. Alterations included re-setting the crown with the original Cullinan diamonds and reducing the number of half-arches from eight to four. The Cullinan V brooch replaced the Koh-i-Noor and a new purple velvet cap was also fitted into the crown. It was officially renamed Queen Camilla's Crown in January 2025.

=== Prince of Wales coronets ===
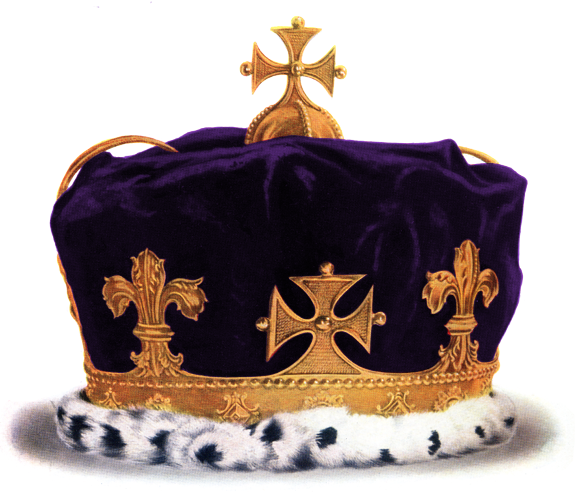
Coronet of Frederick, Prince of Wales

A relatively modest gold coronet was made in 1728 for Frederick, Prince of Wales, the eldest son of George II. It takes the form laid down in a royal warrant issued by Charles II in 1677, which states "the Son & Heir apparent of the Crown for the time being shall use & bear his coronett composed of crosses & flowers de Lizs with one Arch & in the midst a Ball & Cross". The single arch denotes inferiority to the monarch while showing that the prince outranks other royal children, whose coronets have no arches. Frederick never wore his coronet; instead, it was placed on a cushion in front of him when he first took his seat in the House of Lords. It was subsequently used by George III, George IV, and Edward VII when they were Princes of Wales. Due to its age, a new silver-gilt coronet was made for the future George V to wear at Edward VII's coronation in 1902. In contrast to the earlier coronet, which has a depressed arch, the arch on this one is raised.

At George's coronation in 1911 the coronet was worn by his eldest son, Edward, who was invested as Prince of Wales at Caernarfon Castle a month later. The revival of this public ceremony, last performed in the early 17th century, was intended to boost the Royal family's profile in Wales. Princely regalia known as the Honours of Wales were designed for the occasion by Goscombe John, comprising a Welsh gold circlet with pearls, amethysts and engraved daffodils; a rod; a ring; a sword; and a robe with doublet and sash. After he became king in 1936, Edward VIII abdicated the same year and emigrated to France, where the 1902 coronet remained in his possession until his death in 1972. In its absence, a new coronet had to be created in 1969 for the investiture of the future Charles III, which is made from gold and platinum and is set with diamonds and emeralds. Both it and the rod were added to the Jewel House in 2020, joining the 1728 and 1902 coronets. Breaking with tradition, Prince William did not wear a coronet at his father's coronation in 2023 due to the general headcount-reducing ban on coronets, since each would have required a pageboy to carry it.

=== Non-coronation crowns ===
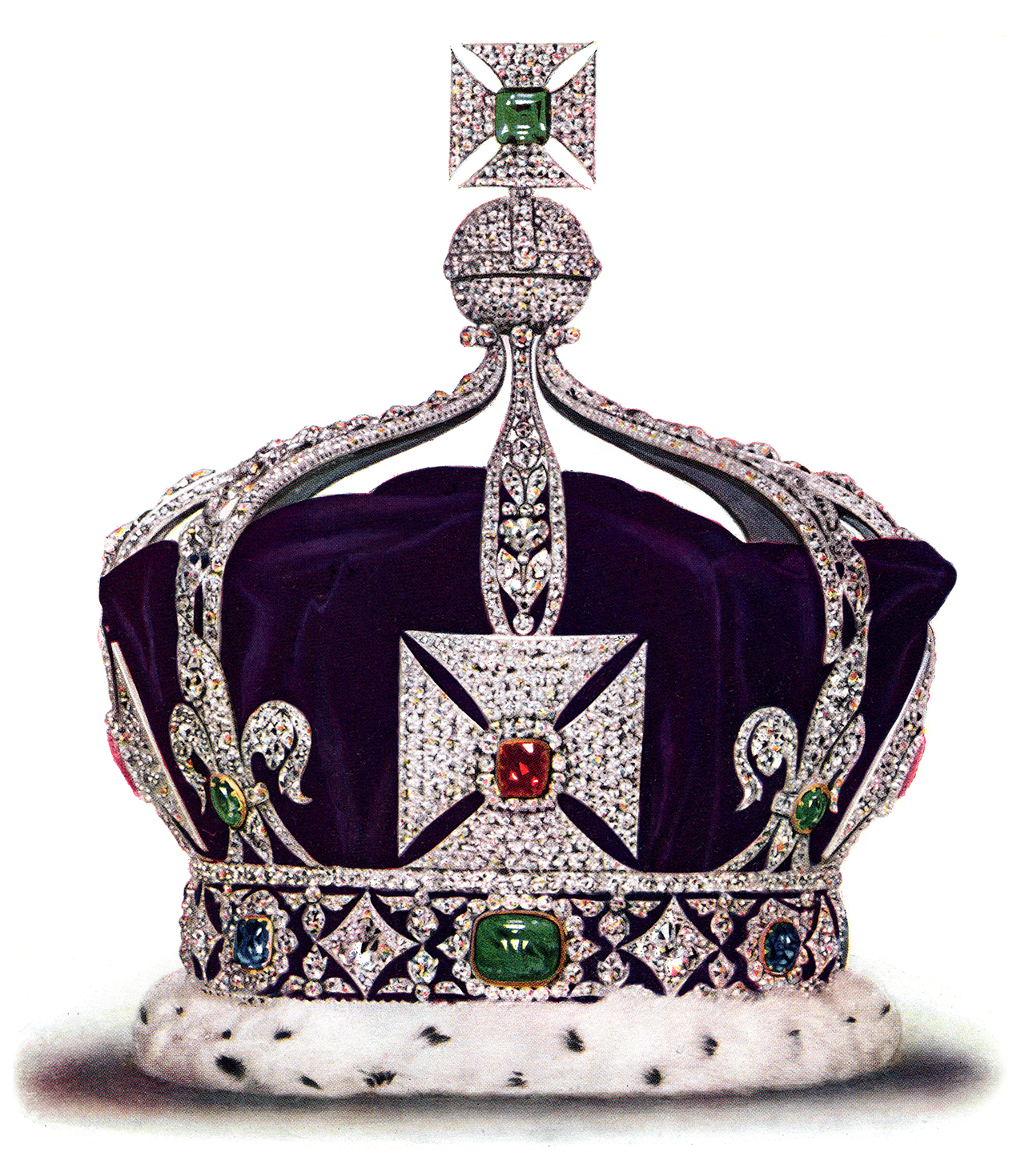
Imperial Crown of India

In the Jewel House there are two crowns that were never intended to be worn at a coronation.

When George V attended the Delhi Durbar in 1911 to be proclaimed (but not crowned) as Emperor of India, he wore the Imperial Crown of India. As the British constitution forbids coronation regalia to leave the United Kingdom, it was not possible for him to wear St Edward's Crown or the Imperial State Crown, so a new crown had to be made specially for the event. It contains 6,170 diamonds, 9 emeralds, 4 rubies and 4 sapphires. The crown has not been used since, and is now considered a part of the Crown Jewels.

Queen Victoria's Small Diamond Crown is 10 cm (4 in) tall and was made in 1870 using 1,187 diamonds for Victoria to wear on top of her widow's cap following the death of her husband, Prince Albert. She often wore it at State Openings of Parliament in place of the much heavier Imperial State Crown. After Victoria's death in 1901, the crown passed to her daughter-in-law, Queen Alexandra, and it was subsequently worn by Queen Mary.

== Processional objects ==
A coronation begins with the procession into Westminster Abbey.

=== Swords ===
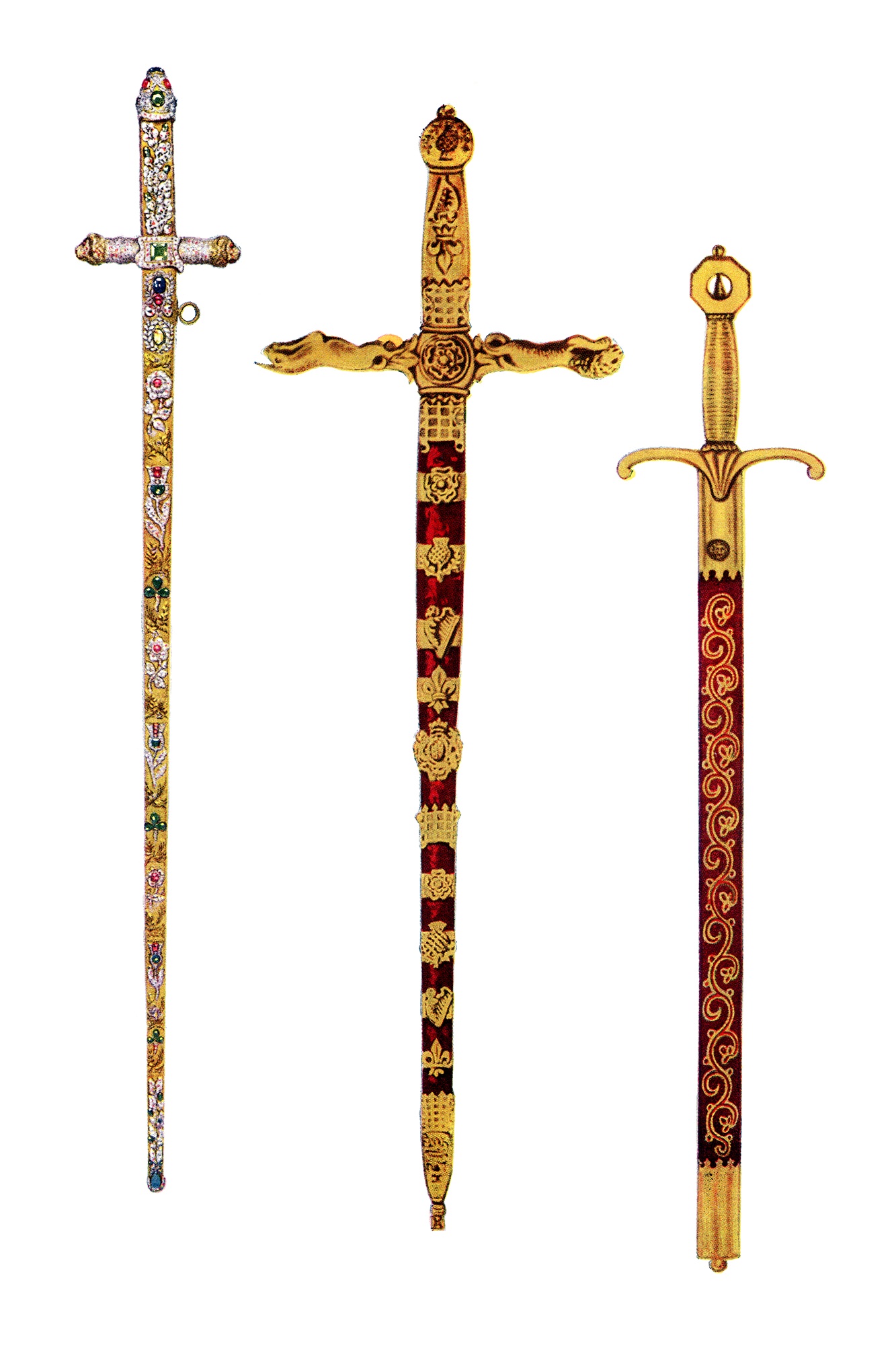
Left to right: The Sword of Offering, the Sword of State, and the Sword of Mercy

The swords of state reflect a monarch's role as Head of the British Armed Forces and Defender of the Faith. Three are carried before the monarch into the Abbey: the blunt Sword of Mercy (also known as Curtana), the Sword of Spiritual Justice, and the Sword of Temporal Justice. All are believed to have been supplied at the time of James I between 1610 and 1620, probably by a member of the Worshipful Company of Cutlers, using blades created in the 1580s by Italian bladesmiths Giandonato and Andrea Ferrara. They were deposited with St Edward's regalia at the Abbey by Charles II. Before that point, new swords had been made for each coronation since the 15th century. Sold in the civil war, they were returned at the Restoration, and their use was first recorded at the coronation of James II in 1685.

The two-handed Sword of State, made in 1678, symbolises the monarch's authority and is also carried before the monarch at State Openings of Parliament. Its wooden sheath, made in 1689, is bound in crimson velvet decorated with silver-gilt emblems of England, Scotland and Ireland, fleurs-de-lis, and portcullises. The lion of England and unicorn of Scotland form the cross-piece to the sword's handle. The sword weighs 3.6 kg (8 lb) and is 1.2 m (4 ft) long. During a coronation it must be held for much of the service pointing upwards without touching the body by the Lord President of the Privy Council.

Before the investiture, the unwieldy Sword of State is exchanged for the lighter Sword of Offering, which is described as "the one true coronation sword". Commissioned by George IV for his extravagant 1821 coronation, its gilded leather sheath is encrusted with 1,251 diamonds, 16 rubies, 2 sapphires and 2 turquoises. The sword has a partly blued and gilt steel blade, and its handle is set with 2,141 diamonds, 12 emeralds and 4 rubies. The stones are arranged to form roses, thistles, shamrocks, oak leaves and acorns. Two diamond lion heads, one at each end of the cross-piece, have ruby eyes. George paid more than £5,000 (equivalent to £475,000 in 2025) for the sword out of his own pocket in a radical change from the austere £2 swords used by his 18th-century predecessors. It remained in the Royal family's personal ownership until 1903 when it was deposited with the Crown Jewels and has been used at every coronation since 1911. A monarch is girded and blessed using the sword, which is returned to the Keeper of the Jewel House by the Abbey for a token sum of £5, (Note: Prior to decimalisation in 1971 the sword was redeemed for 100 shillings.) and is borne unsheathed for the rest of the ceremony.

The 17th-century Irish Sword of State was held by the Lord Lieutenant of Ireland (a viceroy) prior to Ireland's independence from the UK in 1922 and has been displayed in the Jewel House since 1959. The handle takes the form of a lion and a unicorn and is decorated with a Celtic harp. Each new viceroy was invested with the sword at Dublin Castle where it usually sat across the arms of a throne, representing the king or queen in their absence. It was borne in procession in front of monarchs during their official visits to Dublin. In June 1921 the sword was present at the official opening of the Parliament of Northern Ireland by George V. The sword was displayed at Dublin Castle in 2018 as part of the 'Making Majesty' exhibition – the first time it had been to Ireland in 95 years.

=== St Edward's Staff ===
St Edward's Staff is a 1.4-metre-long (4.6 ft) ceremonial gold walking stick made for Charles II in 1661. It has a plain monde and cross at the top and a steel pike at the bottom. This object is almost certainly a copy of the long rod mentioned in the list of royal plate and jewels destroyed in 1649, although the pre-Interregnum version was gold and silver and topped by a dove. The staff's intended role in the coronation has been forgotten since medieval times, and so it is carried into the Abbey by a peer as a holy relic and laid on the altar, where it remains throughout the ceremony. Contemporary records suggest that Charles II walked down the aisle with it in procession from the entrance of the Abbey.

=== Trumpets ===
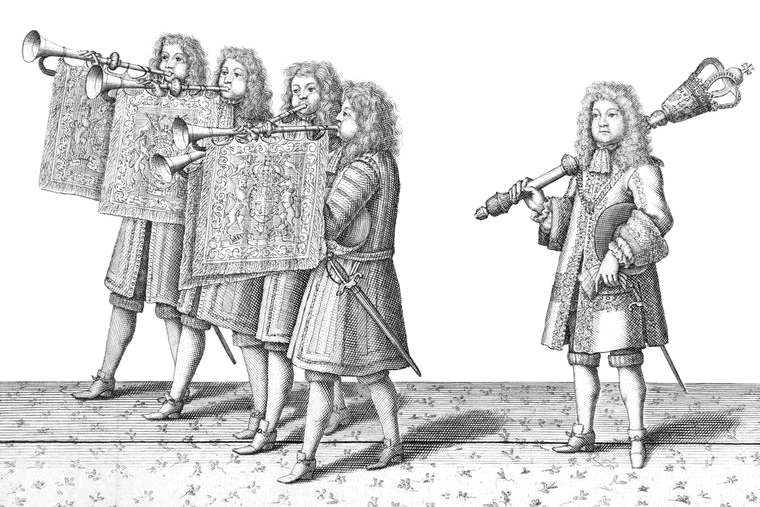
Trumpeters and a mace bearer at the English coronation of James II

The Crown Jewels include 16 silver trumpets dating from between 1780 and 1848. Nine are draped with red silk damask banners embroidered with coats of arms in gold, originally made for Queen Victoria's coronation in 1838. They have not been used since the Corps of State Trumpeters was disbanded as a cost-cutting measure in the 19th century. The trumpeters' main job was to sound a fanfare at key points in the coronation, and they also played at the banquet afterwards in Westminster Hall. Today, the Band of the Household Cavalry and the Central Band of the Royal Air Force play their own trumpets at state occasions.

=== Maces ===
Originally lethal weapons of medieval knights, maces evolved into ceremonial objects carried by sergeants-at-arms to represent the monarch's authority. In parliament, the House of Commons can only operate lawfully when the royal mace – dating from Charles II's reign – is present at the table. Two other maces dating from the reigns of Charles II and William III are used by the House of Lords, one of which is placed on the Woolsack before the house meets and is absent when a monarch is there in person delivering the King's or Queen's Speech. In the late 17th century there were 16 maces, but only 13 survive, 10 of which are kept at the Tower of London. Two maces from the Tower are carried in the royal procession at State Openings of Parliament and coronations. Each silver-gilt mace, made between 1660 and 1695, is around 1.5 m (5 ft) long and weighs an average of 10 kg (22 lb).

== Anointing objects ==
When a monarch is anointed, the Dean of Westminster first pours holy anointing oil from an ampulla into a spoon.

=== Ampulla ===
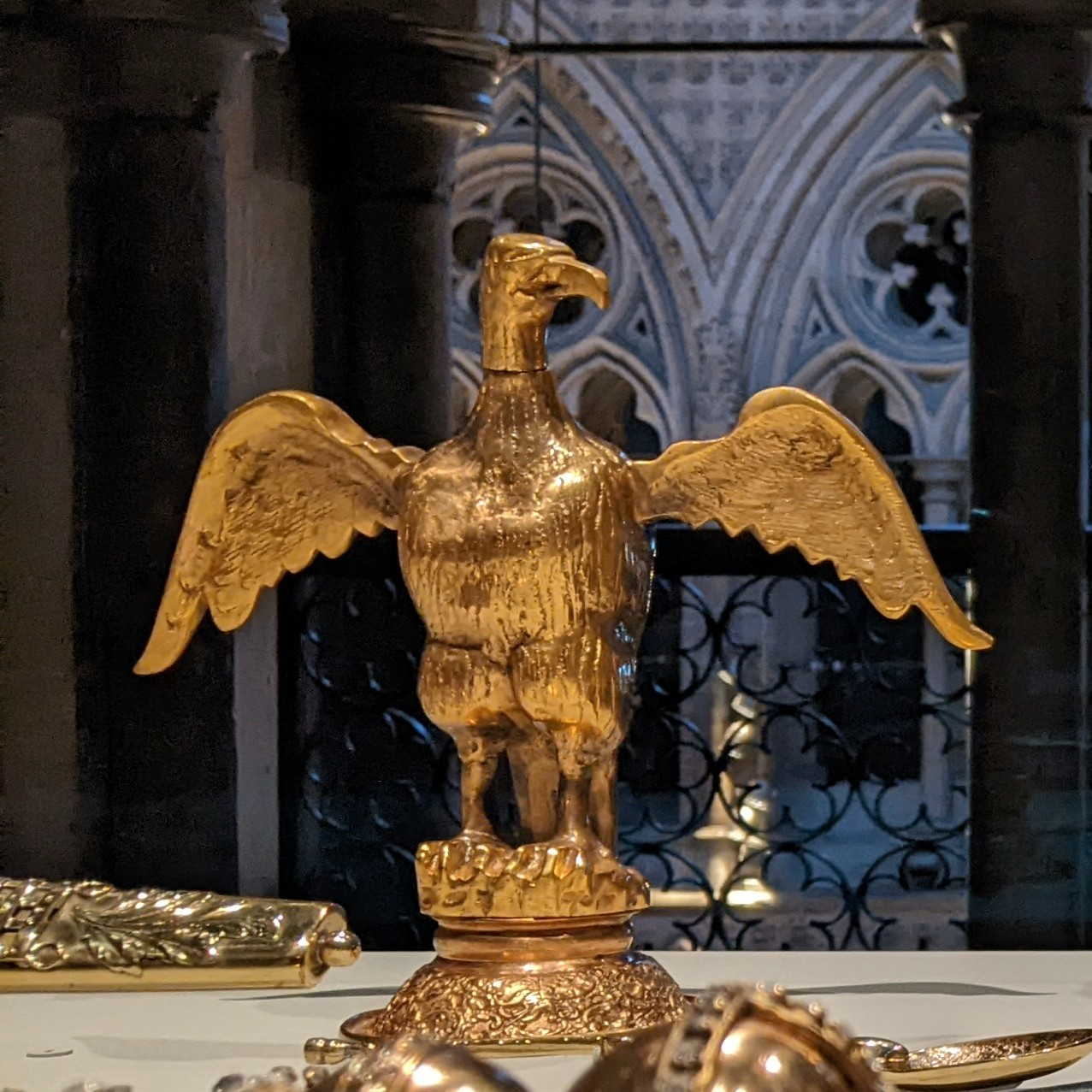
A replica of the 1661 Ampulla housed in the triforium at Westminster Abbey

The Ampulla, 20.5 cm (8 in) tall and weighing 660 g (1 lb 7 1/4 oz), is a hollow gold vessel made in 1661 and shaped like an eagle with outspread wings. Its head unscrews, enabling the vessel to be filled with oil, which exits via a hole in the beak. The original ampulla was a small stone phial, sometimes worn around the neck as a pendant by kings, and otherwise kept inside an eagle-shaped golden reliquary. According to 14th-century legend, the Virgin Mary appeared to Thomas Becket, Archbishop of Canterbury from 1162 until 1170, and presented him with a gold eagle and some oil for anointing English kings. This ampulla was first recorded as being used at Henry IV's coronation in 1399 and was deposited for safekeeping with St Edward's regalia at the Abbey by Richard III in 1483. Known as the Holy Oil of St Thomas, the same batch was used to anoint all subsequent kings and queens (except Mary I) until it eventually ran out in 1625. It is unclear why, after the Restoration, the vessel itself came to be reinterpreted as an eagle standing on a domed base. In terms of religious importance, the anointing objects are second only to St Edward's Crown, and in 2013 the ampulla stood beside the crown on the altar of Westminster Abbey at a service marking the 60th anniversary of Elizabeth II's coronation.

=== Coronation Spoon ===
The 27-centimetre-long (10 1/2 in) Coronation Spoon, which dates from the late 12th century, is silver-gilt and set with four pearls added in the 17th century. A ridge divides the bowl in half, creating grooves into which the Archbishop of Canterbury dips two fingers and anoints the monarch as Supreme Governor of the Church of England. Originally, it may have been used for mixing water and wine in a chalice. The spoon is first known to have been used to anoint a monarch at the English coronation of James I in 1603. It is the oldest surviving piece of the Crown Jewels (and the only surviving English royal goldsmith's work from the 1100s), first recorded in the Royal Collection in 1349 as "a spoon of ancient form", and was probably made for Henry II or Richard I. In 1649 the spoon was sold for 16 shillings to Clement Kynnersley, Yeoman of the Removing Wardrobe, who returned it to Charles II upon the restoration of the monarchy.

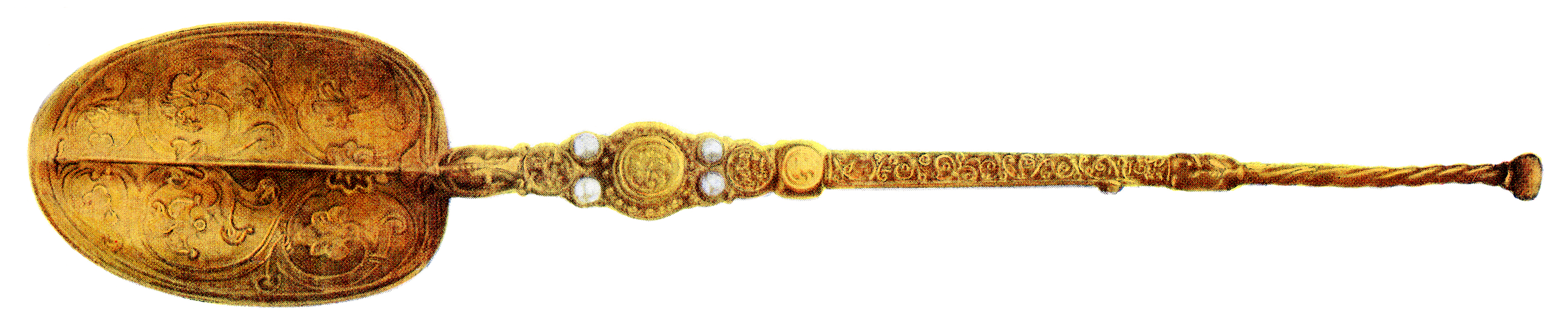
The silver-gilt Coronation Spoon

== Robes and ornaments ==
The anointing is followed by investing with coronations robes and ornaments. (Note: Objects are listed in the order in which they are presented to a monarch.)

=== Robes ===
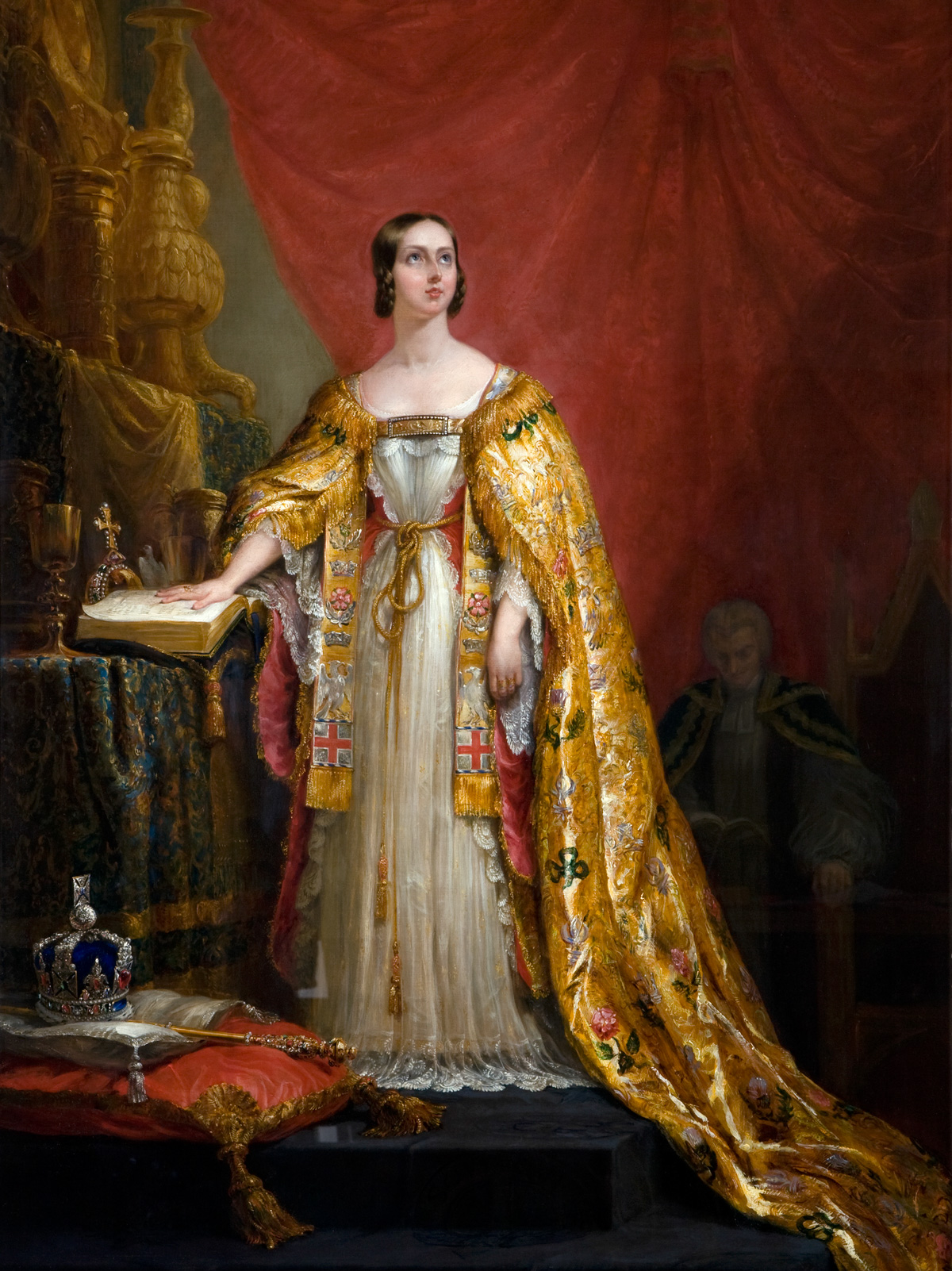
Queen Victoria wearing her coronation robes, 1838

All the robes have priestly connotations and their form has changed little since the Middle Ages. A tradition of wearing St Edward's robes came to an end in 1547 after the English Reformation, but was revived in 1603 by James I to emphasise his belief in the divine nature of kingship. As well as robes, a monarch also wore cloth-of-gold buskins or sandals, depending on his or her foot size. These holy relics were destroyed along with royal crowns and ornaments in the Civil War. New robes were made for each monarch starting with Charles II, a practice that ended in 1911, when George V reused the 1902 Supertunica (a dalmatic), and the Imperial Mantle (a cope), fashioned for George IV in 1821. (Note: George IV never wore the Supertunica. Westminster Abbey took custody of the robe and it was donated to the Crown by a private owner in 1911.) They were also worn by his successors George VI, Elizabeth II and Charles III. Together, the gold robes weigh approximately 10 kg (22 lb). A new Stole Royal was made in 2023 for Charles III by the Royal School of Needlework, taking inspiration from the 1953 stole of his predecessor, Elizabeth II. It is adorned with emblems of the four countries of the United Kingdom, a dove representing the Holy Spirit, a Tudor-style crown, and a pattern based on the Cosmati Pavement in Westminster Abbey.

=== Spurs ===
Prick spurs remade for Charles II are presented to the monarch. They are made of solid gold, richly embossed with floral patterns and scrolls, and have crimson velvet straps embroidered in gold. Both necks terminate in a Tudor rose with a spike at its centre. Also known as St George's Spurs, they are emblems of knighthood and chivalry, and denote the sovereign's role as head of the armed forces. Gold spurs are first known to have been used in 1189 at the coronation of Richard I, though it is likely they were introduced for Henry the Young King in 1170, and this element of the service was probably inspired by the initiation ceremony of knights. A pair of mid 14th-century spurs were added to St Edward's regalia at the Abbey in 1399 and used at all coronations until their destruction in 1649. Historically, spurs were fastened to a monarch's feet, but since the Restoration they are simply presented to the monarch.

=== Armills ===
The Armills are gold bracelets of sincerity and wisdom. Like spurs, they were first used at English coronations in the 12th century. By the 17th century, armills were no longer delivered to the monarch, but simply carried at the coronation. A new pair had to be made in 1661; they are 4 cm (1.6 in) wide, 7 cm (2.8 in) in diameter, and champlevé enamelled on the surface with roses, thistles and harps (the national symbols of England, Scotland and Ireland) as well as fleurs-de-lis. For Elizabeth II's coronation in 1953, the tradition of wearing armills was revived, and a new set of plain 22-karat gold armills lined with crimson velvet presented to the Queen on behalf of various Commonwealth governments. Each bracelet is fitted with an invisible hinge and a clasp in the form of a Tudor rose. The hallmark includes a tiny portrait of the Queen, who continued to wear them upon leaving the Abbey and could be seen wearing them later, along with the Imperial State Crown and Sovereign's Ring, at her appearance on the balcony of Buckingham Palace.

=== Orbs ===
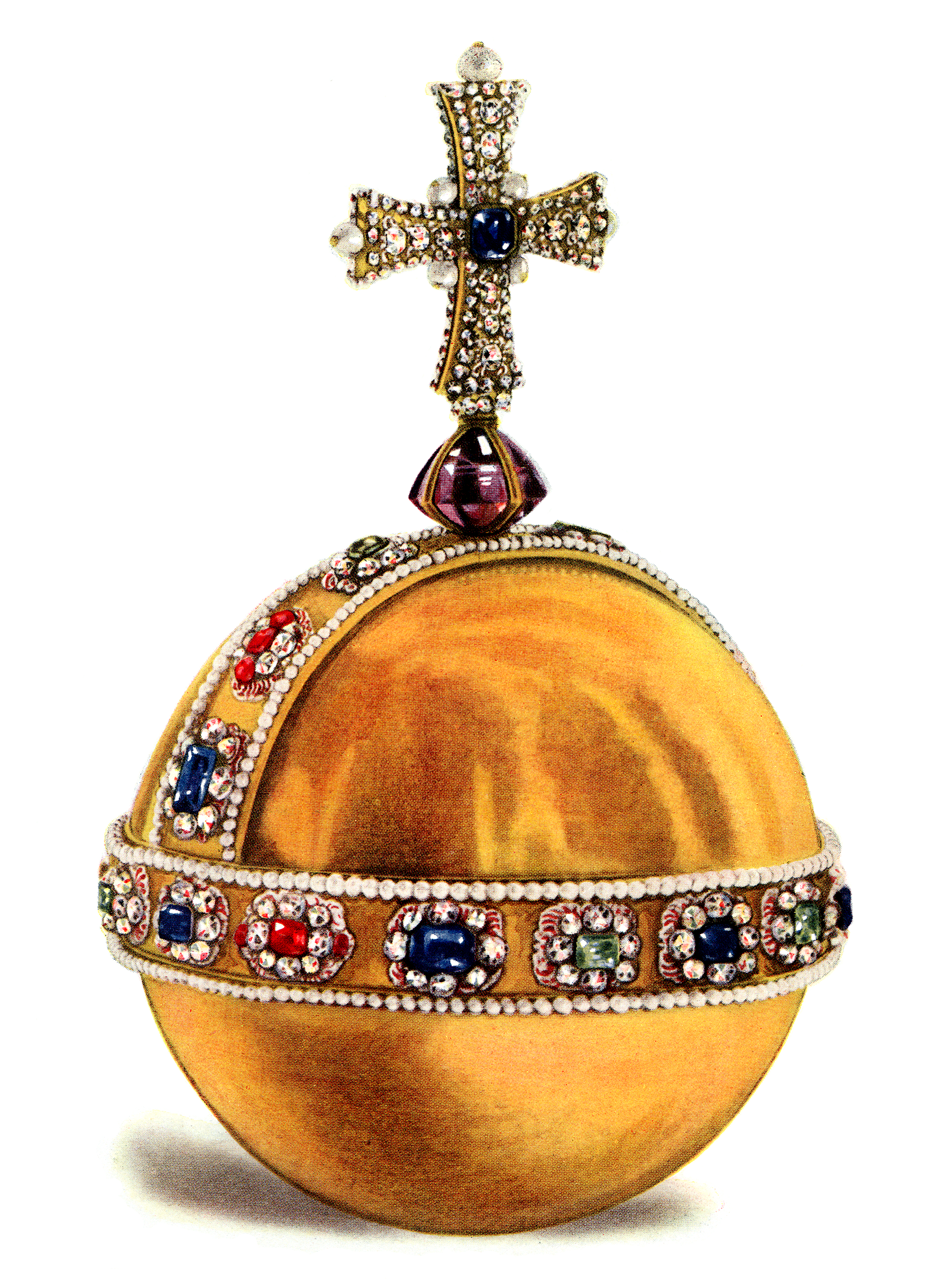
Sovereign's Orb

An orb, a type of globus cruciger, was first used at an English coronation by Henry VIII in 1509, and then by all subsequent monarchs apart from the early Stuart kings James I and Charles I, who opted for the medieval coronation order. The Tudor orb was deposited with St Edward's regalia at Westminster Abbey in 1625. Since 1661 the Sovereign's Orb is a hollow gold sphere about 16.5 cm (6.5 in) in diameter and weighing 1.2 kg (2.6 lb) (more than twice as heavy as the original) made for Charles II. A band of gems and pearls runs along the equator and there is a half-band on the top hemisphere. Atop the orb is an amethyst surmounted by a jewelled cross, symbolising the Christian world, with a sapphire on one side and an emerald on the other. Altogether, the orb is decorated with 375 pearls, 365 diamonds, 18 rubies, 9 emeralds, 9 sapphires, 1 amethyst and 1 piece of glass. It is handed to the sovereign during the investiture rite of the coronation, and is borne later in the left hand when leaving Westminster Abbey. A small version, originally set with hired gems, was made in 1689 for Mary II to hold at her coronation as joint sovereign with William III; it was never used again at a coronation and was re-set with imitation gems and cultured pearls. The orb is 14.6 cm (5.7 in) in diameter and weighs 1.07 kg (2.4 lb). Both orbs were laid on Queen Victoria's coffin at her state funeral in 1901. Officially, no reason was given for using Mary II's orb, but it may have been intended to reflect Victoria's position as Empress of India.

=== Rings ===
The Sovereign's Ring has been worn by monarchs at their coronation since William IV in 1831, with the exceptions of Queen Victoria, whose fingers were too small to retain it, and Charles III, who acknowledged the ring but did not wear it. In the centre is a large octagonal sapphire overlaid with rubies forming a cross, surrounded by 14 brilliant diamonds. The general design is intended to represent the red St George's Cross (England) on the blue background of St Andrew's Cross (Scotland). Rubies symbolise all the kingly virtues – such as humility, good morals, and charity – and have featured on coronation rings since the early Middle Ages. A small copy was made for Victoria, who wrote in a letter: "The Archbishop had (most awkwardly) put the ring on the wrong finger, and the consequence was that I had the greatest difficulty to take it off again, which I at last did with great pain" – her jewellers had measured the wrong finger. In 1919 both rings were deposited at the Tower along with the Queen Consort's Ring, which is similar in design and was made in 1831 for Queen Adelaide.

Before 1831, monarchs generally received a new ring symbolising their "marriage" to the nation, with perhaps two exceptions: Richard II offered Westminster Abbey a "solemn jewel, a gold ring set with a precious stone called a ruby, of no small value" to be worn by his successors. Evidence suggests it was later worn by Henry V. Another was the Stuart Coronation Ring, probably used at the English coronations of Charles I and Charles II, and certainly that of James II, who took it into exile with him in France after the Glorious Revolution in 1688. It was returned to the British monarchy 100 years later and belongs to the Royal Collection of Gems and Jewels. The ring has a large ruby etched with a St George's Cross and bordered by 26 diamonds. Since 1830 it has been on permanent loan from Windsor Castle to Edinburgh Castle where it is displayed with the Honours of Scotland. The coronation ring of Mary II survives in the Portland Collection at Welbeck Abbey.

=== Sceptres ===
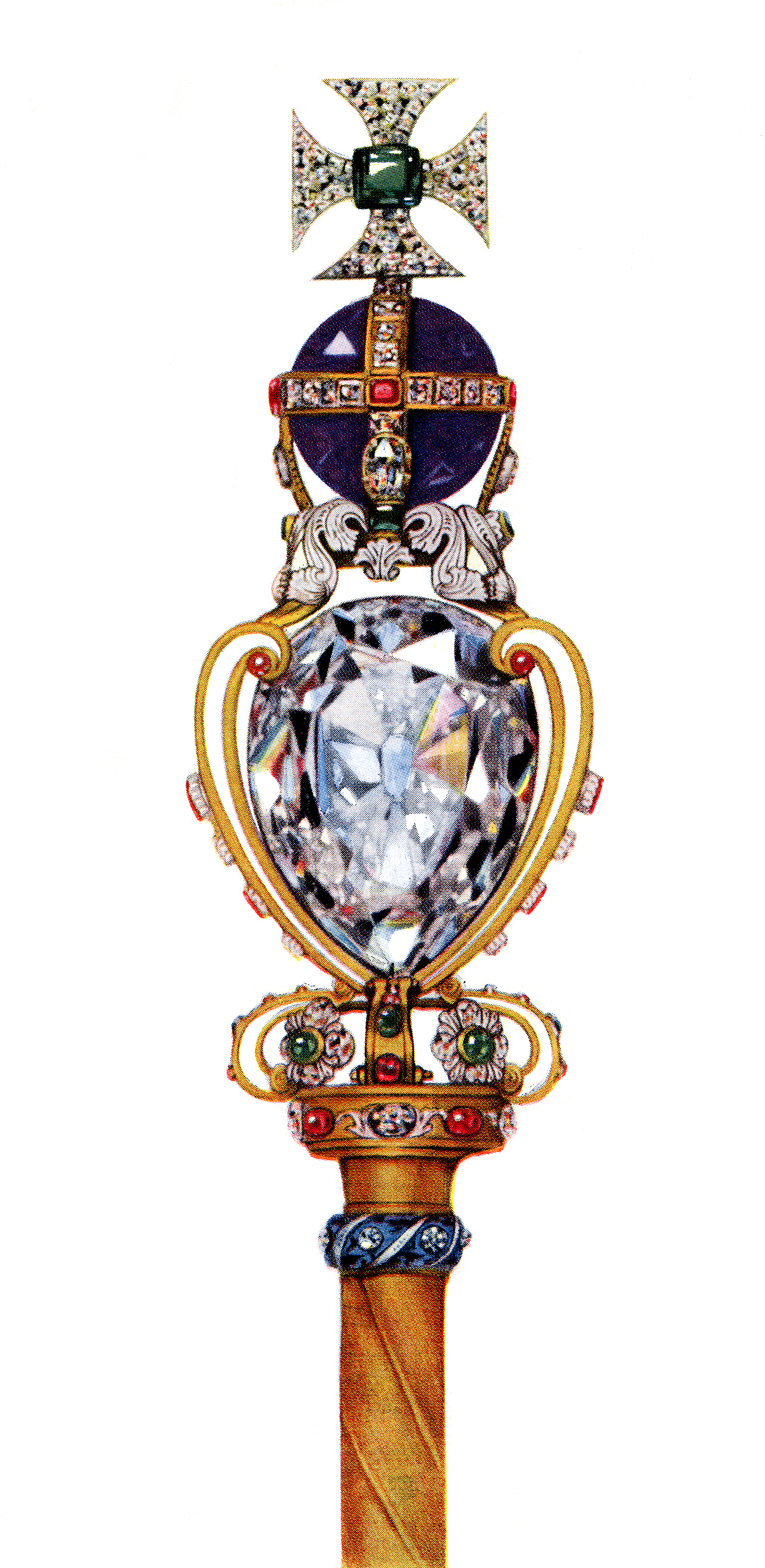
The head of the Sovereign's Sceptre with Cross

The sceptre, a symbolic ornamental rod held by the monarch at a coronation, is derived from the shepherd's staff via the crozier of a bishop. Two gold sceptres made in 1661 are part of the coronation regalia. The Sovereign's Sceptre with Cross is a token of his or her temporal power as head of state. The whole object is 92 cm (3 ft) long, weighs around 1.17 kg (2.6 lb), and is decorated with 333 diamonds, 31 rubies, 15 emeralds, 7 sapphires, 6 spinels, and 1 composite amethyst. In 1910, it was redesigned to incorporate Cullinan I, also known as the Great Star of Africa, which, at over 530 carats (106 g), is the largest clear cut diamond in the world. It was part of a rough diamond weighing 3,106 carats (621.2 g) found in South Africa in 1905, and was named after Thomas Cullinan, the chairman of the mining company. The gold clasps holding it can be opened and the stone removed to be worn as a pendant hanging from Cullinan II, which is set in the Imperial State Crown, to form a brooch – Queen Mary often wore it like this. Above the pear-shaped diamond is the amethyst surmounted by a cross pattée encrusted with an emerald and small diamonds.

The Sovereign's Sceptre with Dove, which has also been known as the Rod of Equity and Mercy, is emblematic of the monarch's spiritual role. It is slightly longer, at 1.1 m (3.6 ft), but weighs about the same as the Sceptre with Cross. The sceptre is decorated with 285 gemstones, including 94 diamonds, 53 rubies, 10 emeralds, 4 sapphires and 3 spinels. Circling the rod are bands of precious stones. At the top is a gold monde set with diamonds and topped by a plain cross, upon which sits a white enamelled dove with its wings outspread, representing the Holy Ghost. A sceptre like this first appeared in the 11th century and was probably based on the German sceptre, which was topped by an Imperial Eagle. The Sceptre with Dove is the penultimate piece of regalia to be delivered. Holding both sceptres, the monarch is crowned with St Edward's Crown.

The Crown Jewels include two sceptres made for Mary of Modena in 1685: a gold sceptre with a cross known as the Queen Consort's Sceptre with Cross, and another made of ivory topped by a dove known as the Queen Consort's Ivory Rod with Dove. Unlike the sovereign's dove, this one has folded wings and is relatively small. For the coronation of Mary II, the wife and joint sovereign of William III, a more elaborate gold sceptre with dove was commissioned in 1689. It has not been used since, and went missing for several decades, only to be found in 1814 at the back of a cupboard in the Tower of London.

== Altar plate ==
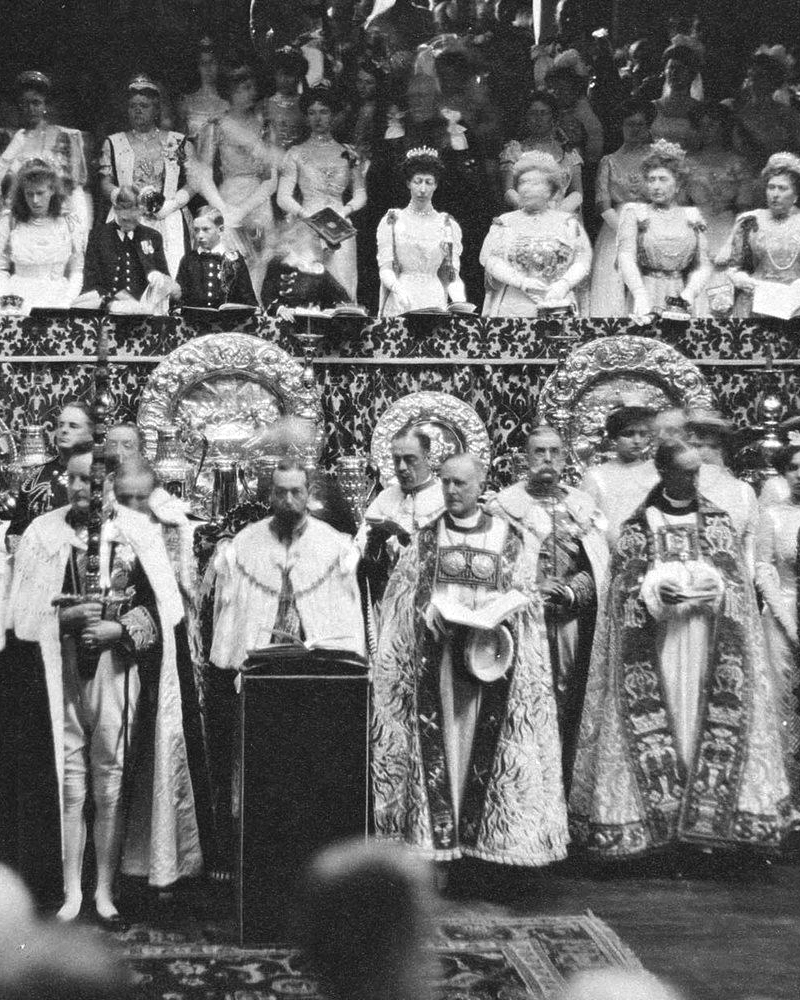
Altar dishes behind George V at his coronation in 1911

In the Jewel House there is a collection of chalices, patens, flagons, candlesticks, and dishes – all silver-gilt except five gold communion vessels – that are displayed on the altars of Westminster Abbey during coronations. Although not regalia these items, known as plate (from the Spanish plata, meaning silver), are considered to be Crown Jewels by virtue of their long association with the Jewel House.

One of the most striking pieces is a large dish 95 cm (3.12 ft) across and weighing 13 kg (28.7 lb), in the centre of which is a relief depiction of the Last Supper. Around the edge are four engravings of biblical scenes: the Washing of the Feet, the Walk to Emmaus, the Coming of the Holy Ghost, and Christ's Commission to the Apostles. Made in 1664 for James, Duke of York, and later acquired by Charles II, it stands on the high altar during a coronation ceremony. At each end of the altar stands a 91 cm (3 ft) tall candlestick made in the 17th century, which is engraved all over with scrolls, leaves and flowers.

An altar dish and flagon were made in 1691 for the royal Church of St Peter ad Vincula at the Tower of London. The dish measures 70 cm (2.3 ft) across and depicts the Last Supper above the coat of arms of co-monarchs William III and Mary II. The flagon stands 42.5 cm (1.4 ft) tall. Both pieces are still used in the chapel on Easter, Whitsun and Christmas, and they were first displayed at a coronation in 1821.

Another dish still in regular use is the Maundy Dish – one of six used by the King at Royal Maundy for handing out alms to elderly people in recognition of their service to the church and local community. The ceremony, which takes place in a different cathedral every year, entirely replaced the ancient custom of washing the feet of the poor in 1730, and the dish, though it bears the royal cypher of William and Mary, dates from the reign of Charles II. Two purses containing specially minted coins are taken from the dish and presented to each recipient.

== Banqueting plate ==
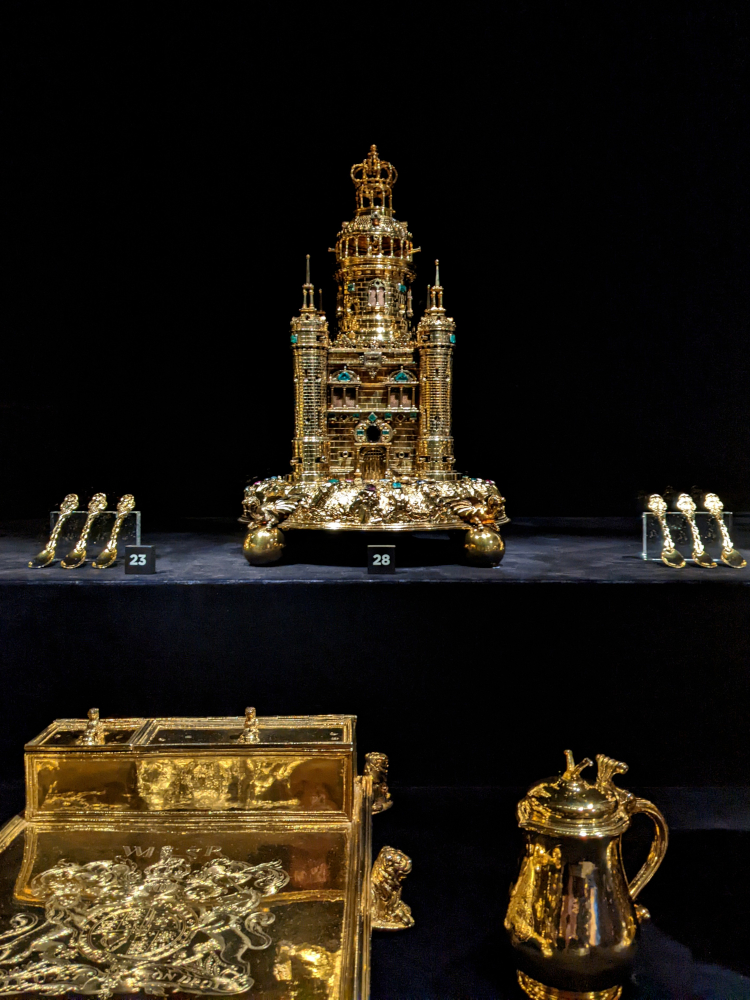
The Exeter Salt top centre with salt spoons either side, a caddinet (spice box) lower left, and a cruet lower right

The last coronation banquet held at Westminster Hall took place in 1821 for George IV. Silverware used at those banquets include the Plymouth Fountain, a wine fountain made around 1640 by a German goldsmith and presented to Charles II by the city of Plymouth. Gilded for George II in 1726, it is 77.5 cm (2.5 ft) tall and decorated with flowers, fruit, dolphins, mermaids and sea monsters. The nautical theme is continued in the silver-gilt Wine Cistern, also known as the Grand Punch Bowl, which is cast as a giant oyster shell. It weighs 257 kg (567 lb), measures 0.76 m × 1.38 m × 1.01 m (2.5 ft × 4.5 ft × 3.3 ft), and can hold 144 bottles of wine on ice. It was commissioned in 1829 by George IV but not completed until after his death. It is the heaviest surviving piece of English banqueting plate. In 1841, the cistern was re-purposed as a punch bowl, with the addition of a large ivory-stemmed ladle, which has a silver-gilt bowl in the form of a nautilus shell.

The Exeter Salt is a 45-centimetre (1.5 ft) tall salt cellar in the form of a castle on a rocky outcrop. Each of its four main compartments held about 29 g (1 oz) of salt, while smaller ones held pepper and other spices. It was made c. 1630 in Germany and is set with 73 gems probably added later. The Salt was bought in Hamburg in 1657 by the city's British Resident as a peace offering to the Russian court, which had cut all ties with Britain during the Interregnum. He was turned away at the Russian border and eventually took it home to London. In 1660, it was acquired from a private dealer for £700 (equivalent to £122,000 in 2025) by the city of Exeter and presented to Charles II.

Eleven smaller salts named after St George were originally made for a St George's Day banquet of the Knights of the Garter in the late 17th century. A twelfth, the Queen Elizabeth Salt, was made in 1572 during the reign of Elizabeth I for a member of the aristocracy; it was later acquired by Charles II. Twelve spoons made for George IV in 1820 complement these salts.

== Baptismal plate ==
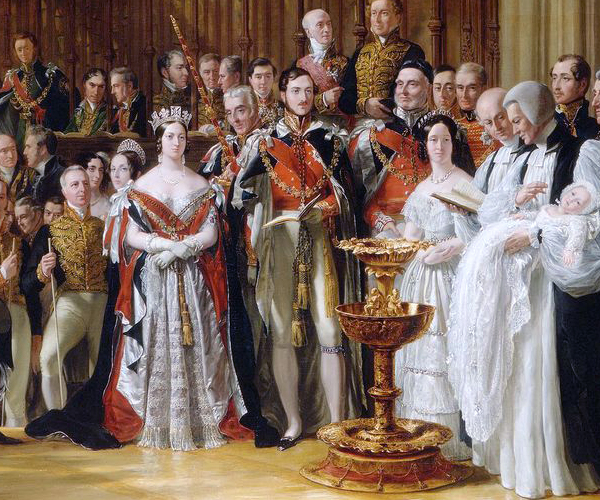
The Lily Font on top of the Charles II font and basin at the christening of Edward, Prince of Wales in 1842

Three silver-gilt objects (comprising a total of six parts) associated with royal christenings are displayed in the Jewel House. Charles II's 95-centimetre (3 ft 1 in) tall font was created in 1661 and stood on a basin to catch any spills. Surmounting the font's domed lid is a figure of Philip the Evangelist baptising the Ethiopian eunuch. While Charles's marriage to Catherine of Braganza produced no heir, the font may have been used to secretly baptise some of his 13 illegitimate children. In 1688, James Francis Edward Stuart, son of James II and Mary of Modena, was the first royal baby to be christened using this object.

A ewer and basin of French design made in 1735 were only used at two christenings. The 46-centimetre (1 ft 6 in) tall ewer's handle is topped by a figure of Hercules slaying the Hydra, an unlikely motif for baptismal plate, suggesting it originally had an alternate purpose. Indeed, it was first used in 1738 at the impromptu christening of a "very ill" future George III only hours after his birth. His father, Frederick, Prince of Wales, was banished from the royal court and forbidden to use the Charles II font. An inscription on the ewer records its presence at the 1780 christening of George III's youngest son, Prince Alfred.

The Lily Font was made in 1840 for the christening of Victoria, Princess Royal, the first child of Queen Victoria, who declined to use the Charles II font because of its unseemly history. The 1661 font was recycled as a plinth (pictured) and its basin found a new role as an altar dish. The Lily Font stands 43 centimetres (1 ft 5 in) tall and weighs approximately 10 kg (22 lb). It is decorated with water lilies, symbolising purity and new life, and cherubs plucking lyres. The object has been used for the christenings of all of Elizabeth II's children and grandchildren (except Princess Eugenie) with holy water brought from the River Jordan.

== Ownership, management and value ==
The Crown Jewels are part of the Royal Collection. As with Royal palaces, ownership is regarded as inalienable and passes from one monarch to the next in perpetuity. However, a 17th-century ruling by Sir Edward Coke, which states "the ancient jewels of the crown are heirloomes and shall descend to the next successor and are not devisable by testament", contains an exception allowing the monarch to dispose of objects via letters patent during their lifetime under the Great Seal or Privy Seal. (Note: Further reading on this subject: Nash, Michael L. (2017). "The Jewels of the Kingdom". Royal Wills in Britain from 1509 to 2008. Palgrave Macmillan. pp. 61–86. ISBN 978-1-137-60144-5.) In 1995, Iain Sproat, then a Minister of State at the Department of National Heritage, confirmed that the disposal of the Royal Collection was "entirely a matter for the Queen". Their potential value is generally not included in estimates of the monarch's wealth because in practice it is unlikely the Crown Jewels will ever be sold, nor are they insured against loss, and are officially described as priceless. (Note: In 1995, three disused crown frames then owned by the jewellers Asprey & Garrard, which are now kept in the Tower of London, were valued for an export licence application: State Crown of George I, £576,000 (c. £1,130,000 in 2024); Crown of Queen Adelaide, £425,000 (c. £834,000 in 2024); Coronation Crown of George IV, £376,000 (c. £737,000 in 2024)) Maintenance, alteration and repair falls to the Crown Jeweller, a member of the Royal Household who cleans them after visiting hours at the Tower of London each January and accompanies the regalia and plate whenever they leave the Tower for use at royal ceremonies. Older items have been conserved by experts from the British Museum. The Royal Collection Trust keeps an inventory of the jewels, and Historic Royal Palaces is responsible for their display.

== See also ==
- Cap of Maintenance
- Collar (order)
- Diamond Diadem
- Jewels of Elizabeth II
- Royal Family Orders of the United Kingdom

== Bibliography ==
- Abramova, Natalya; Dmitrieva, Olga, eds. (2006). Britannia & Muscovy: English Silver at the Court of the Tsars. Yale University Press. ISBN 978-0-300-11678-6.
- Allison, Ronald; Riddell, Sarah (1991). The Royal Encyclopedia. Macmillan Press. ISBN 978-0-333-53810-4.
- Aronson, Theo (1997). Princess Margaret: A Biography. M. O'Mara Books. ISBN 978-1-85479-248-8.
- Barclay, Andrew (2008). "The 1661 St Edward's Crown – Refurbished, Recycled or Replaced?". The Court Historian. 13 (2): 149–170. doi:10.1179/cou.2008.13.2.002. S2CID 159809217.
- Barker, Brian (1979). The Symbols of Sovereignty. Westbridge Books. ISBN 978-0-7153-7649-2.
- Bird, Rufus; Clayton, Martin, eds. (2017). Charles II: Art and Power. Royal Collection Trust. ISBN 978-1-909741-44-7.
- Blair, Claude, ed. (1998). The Crown Jewels: The History of the Coronation Regalia …. The Stationery Office. ISBN 978-0-11-701359-9.
- Bogdanor, Vernon (1997). The Monarchy and the Constitution. Oxford University Press. ISBN 978-0-19-829334-7.
- Boutell, Charles (1983). Brooke-Little, J. P. (ed.). Boutell's Heraldry. Warne. ISBN 978-0-7232-3093-9.
- Breeze, David John; Clancy, Thomas Owen; Welander, Richard (2003). The Stone of Destiny: Artefact and Icon. Society of Antiquaries of Scotland. ISBN 978-0-903903-22-6.
- Collins, Arthur Jefferies (1955). Jewels and Plate of Queen Elizabeth I. Trustees of the British Museum. ISBN 978-0-7141-0445-4.
- Cox, Noel (1999). "Coronation Robes of the Sovereign". Arma, the Journal of the Heraldry Society of Southern Africa. 5 (1): 271–280.
- Dixon-Smith, Sally; Edwards, Sebastian; Kilby, Sarah; Murphy, Clare; Souden, David; Spooner, Jane; Worsley, Lucy (2010). The Crown Jewels: Souvenir Guidebook. Historic Royal Palaces. ISBN 978-1-873993-13-2.
- Hammond, Peter (1981). The Tower of London: Young Visitor's Guide. HM Stationery Office. ISBN 978-0-11-671054-3.
- Hardman, Robert (2023). The Making of a King: King Charles III and the Modern Monarchy. Simon and Schuster. ISBN 978-1-63936-532-6.
- Hennessy, Elizabeth (1992). A Domestic History of the Bank of England, 1930–1960. Cambridge University Press. ISBN 978-0-521-39140-5.
- Hibbert, Christopher (2000). Queen Victoria in Her Letters and Journals. Sutton. ISBN 978-0-7509-2349-1.
- Hinton, David A. (2006). Gold and Gilt, Pots and Pins: Possessions and People in Medieval Britain. Oxford University Press. ISBN 978-0-19-926454-4.
- Hoak, Dale, ed. (2002). Tudor Political Culture. Cambridge University Press. ISBN 978-0-521-52014-0.
- Hoey, Brian (1992). All the Queen's Men: Inside the Royal Household. HarperCollins. ISBN 978-0-246-13851-4.
- Holmes, Martin (1959). "New Light on St. Edward's Crown". Archaeologia. 97: 213–223. doi:10.1017/S0261340900010006.
- Holmes, Martin Rivington; Sitwell, Hervey Degge Wilmot (1972). The English Regalia: Their History, Custody and Display. HM Stationery Office. ISBN 978-0-11-670407-8.
- Jacobsen, Helen (2012). Luxury and Power: The Material World of the Stuart Diplomat, 1660–1714. Oxford University Press. ISBN 978-0-19-969375-7.
- Jenkins, Susan; Trowles, Tony (2018). The Queen's Diamond Jubilee Galleries: Westminster Abbey. Scala Arts & Heritage Publishers. ISBN 978-1-78551-131-8.
- Jones, Edward Alfred (1908). The Old Royal Plate in the Tower of London. Fox, Jones & Co. ASIN B004BWZDGY.
- Keay, Anna (2002). The Crown Jewels: Official Guidebook. Historic Royal Palaces. ISBN 978-1-873993-20-0.
- ——— (2011). The Crown Jewels. Thames & Hudson. ISBN 978-0-500-51575-4.
- King George's Jubilee Trust (1937). The Coronation of … King George VI and Queen Elizabeth. Odhams Press. ASIN B000NNCSEK.
- MacGregor, Arthur, ed. (1989). The Late King's Goods: Collections, Possessions and Patronage of Charles I …. Alistair McAlpine. ISBN 978-0-19-920171-6.
- McCracken-Flesher, Caroline, ed. (2007). Culture, Nation, and the New Scottish Parliament. Bucknell University Press. ISBN 978-0-8387-5547-1.
- Mears, Kenneth J.; Thurley, Simon; Murphy, Claire (1994). The Crown Jewels. Historic Royal Palaces. ASIN B000HHY1ZQ.
- Morris, Bob (2018). Inaugurating a New Reign: Planning for Accession and Coronation. University College London. ISBN 978-1-903903-82-7. Archived from the original on 22 October 2018.
- Nicholas, David M. (2014). The Evolution of the Medieval World: Society, Government and Thought in Europe, 312–1500. Routledge. ISBN 978-1-317-89543-5.
- Oman, Charles (1974). British Rings, 800–1914. Batsford. ISBN 978-0-87471-449-4.
- Parfitt, Keith (1995). Iron Age Burials from Mill Hill, Deal. British Museum Press. ISBN 978-0-7141-2304-2.
- Piacenti, Kirsten Aschengreen; Boardman, John (2008). Ancient and Modern Gems and Jewels in the Collection of Her Majesty The Queen (PDF). Royal Collection Trust. ISBN 978-1-902163-47-5. Archived from the original (PDF) on 26 January 2018.
- Reviewing Committee on the Export of Works of Art (1995). Export of Works of Art: 1994–95. HM Stationery Office.
- Rose, Tessa (1992). The Coronation Ceremony and the Crown Jewels. HM Stationery Office. ISBN 978-0-11-701361-2.
- Schroder, Timothy (2020). 'A Marvel to Behold': Gold and Silver at the Court of Henry VIII. Boydell Press. ISBN 978-1-78327-507-6.
- Shenton, Caroline (2021). National Treasures: Saving the Nation's Art in World War II. London: John Murray. ISBN 978-1-5293-8743-8.
- Steane, John (2003). The Archaeology of the Medieval English Monarchy. Routledge. ISBN 978-1-134-64159-8.
- Stratford, Jenny (2012). Richard II and the English Royal Treasure. Boydell Press. ISBN 978-1-84383-378-9.
- Strong, Roy (2006). Coronation: From the 8th to the 21st Century. Harper Perennial. ISBN 978-0-00-716055-6.
- Twining, Edward Francis (1960). A History of the Crown Jewels of Europe. B. T. Batsford. ASIN B00283LZA6.
- Williams, Patricia (2012). Historical Texts from Medieval Wales. Modern Humanities Research Association. ISBN 978-1-907322-60-0.
