= Deal Warrior =

Iron age burial site

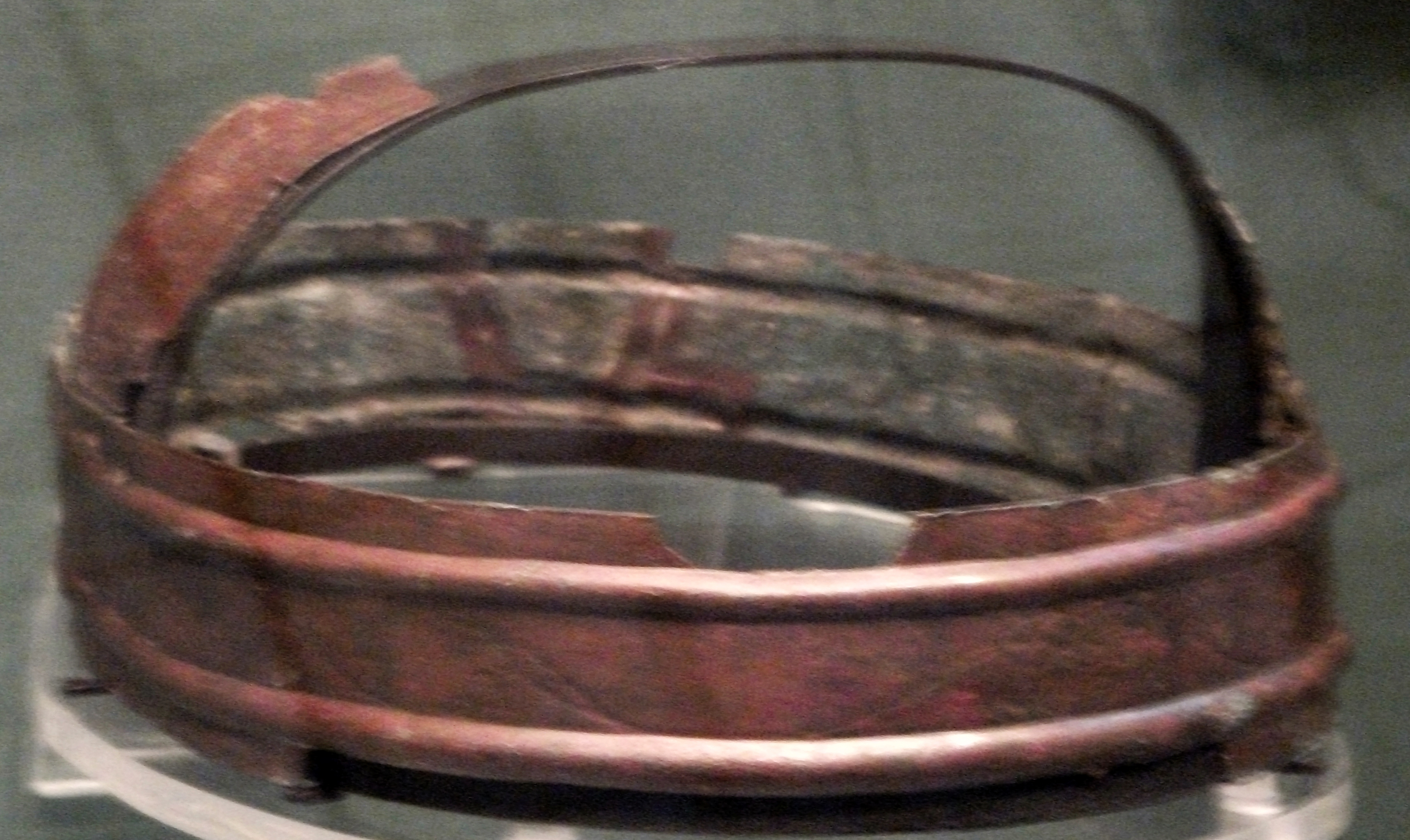
Headdress of the "Deal Warrior", 200–150 BCE, British Museum

The Deal Warrior, also known as the Mill Hill Warrior, is an Iron Age burial uncovered in Grave 112 at Mill Hill near Deal, Kent in 1988 by Dover Archaeological Group. It is well known for being suggested as the grave of a druid due to containing an almost-unique bronze headdress.

== Background ==
The grave, dated to around 250 to 150 BCE, contained the skeleton of a man in his thirties, short and slightly built. With the skeleton was a long iron sword, bronze fittings for a scabbard and belt, a bronze brooch studded with coral, and bronze fittings for a large shield. The quality of these finds suggests the grave was a high status burial, as swords were an expensive item available only to the aristocracy and their retainers, and the wealthier freemen.

== The crown ==
On the skull was a bronze headband, with the remains of another band that would have gone over the top. Both the skull and the "crown", as it came to be named, were badly damaged, thought by the archaeologists who discovered it to be the result of ploughing. Closer inspection after cleaning revealed it to be intricately decorated in the La Tène style. The bronze, now dull, would once have been burnished till it shone. Examination also revealed imprints of hair on the inside of the crown, indicating it was worn without a liner, also proving it was not worn over a leather helmet, as some had suggested.

== Druid theory ==
A connection has been drawn between this crown and headdresses found in later Romano-British religious sites at Hockwold, Norfolk, and Wanborough, Surrey. It also bears a resemblance to descriptions of Iron Age antiquarian finds from Newnham Croft, Cambridgeshire, Old Castle Down, Glamorganshire and Cerrig-y-Drudion, Clwyd. It has been suggested that headdresses found at Romano-British temples may have been following a long-standing tradition. The implied religious connection has led some historians to suggest that the Deal Warrior may well have been a druid, a member of the pre-Roman British intellectual and priestly class. Others have suggested the crown, together with the warrior nature of the burial, implies a military leader.
