= Edward Barnard and Sons =

- Company type: Private
- Industry: Silversmithing
- Founded: c. 1680
- Founder: Anthony Nelme
- Defunct: 2003
- Fate: Became a subsidiary of Padgett & Braham, then closed
- Headquarters: London, United Kingdom
- Key people: Edward Barnard (first manager and later proprietor)
- Products: Silverware, including the Lily font

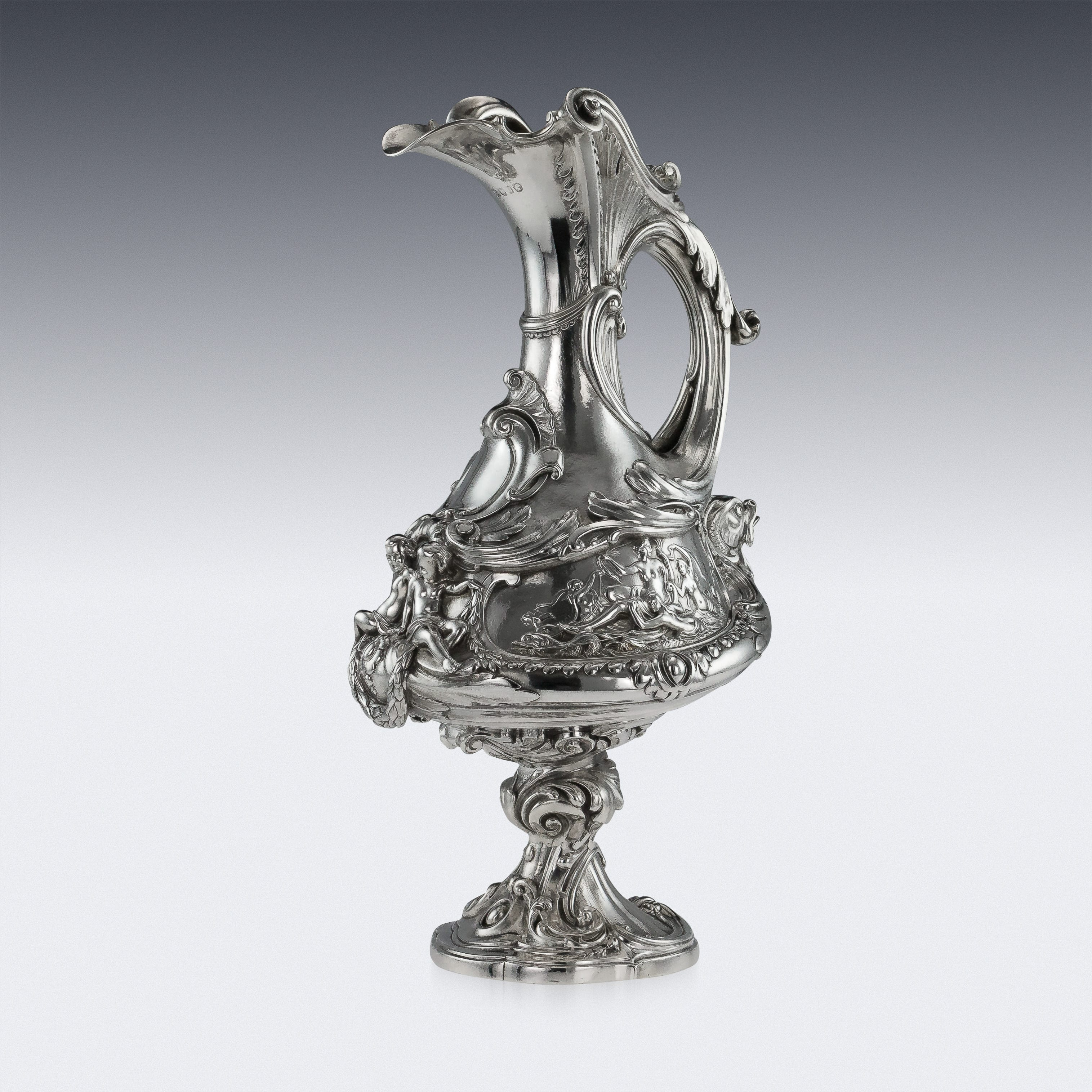
Antique Victorian solid silver ewer by Edward Barnard & Sons c.1869

Edward Barnard and Sons was a firm of British silversmiths. They created the Lily font, a large silver gilt baptismal font used in the christening services of members of the British Royal family.

The company's origins date back to about 1680, when the silversmith Anthony Nelme (d. 1722) established a firm in Ave Maria Lane, London. Edward Barnard (d. 1855) was first manager and in 1829 became the proprietor, trading as Edward Barnard & Sons, with his sons Edward Barnard (d. 1868), John Barnard and William Barnard (d. 1851). Edward and his sons were buried on the western side of Highgate Cemetery. In 1838, the firm moved to Angel Street, London.

The Lily font was commissioned by Queen Victoria from Edward Barnard and Sons, for the christening of her first child, Victoria, Princess Royal on 10 February 1840, her parents' first wedding anniversary.

In 1898, they moved to Fetter Lane, and in 1920, to Hatton Garden, London. In 1977, they became a subsidiary of Padgett & Braham, and closed in 2003.
