= Imperial Crown of Brazil =

Crown worn by Dom Pedro II

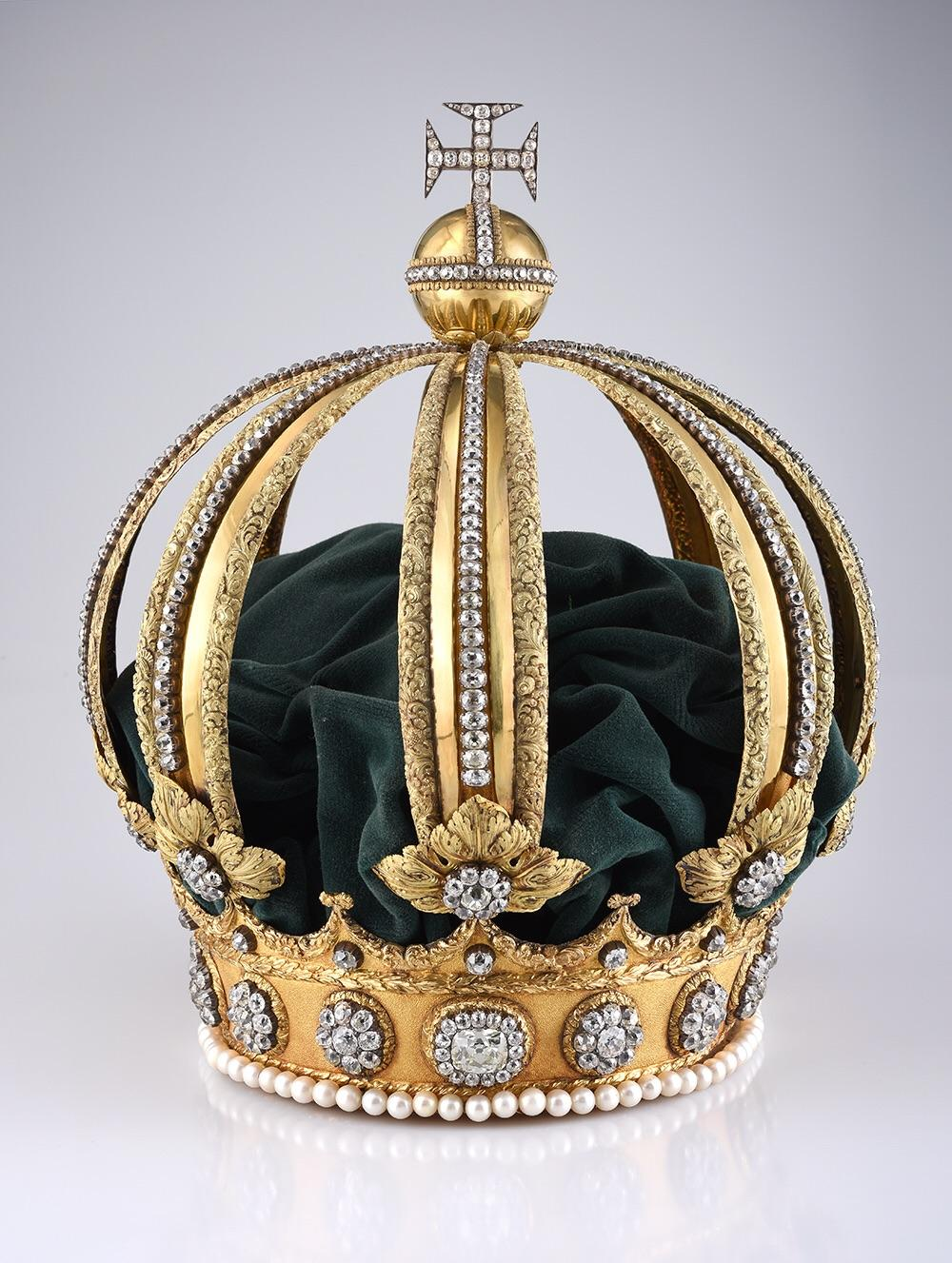
- The Imperial Crown on display at the Imperial Museum of Brazil

Heraldic depictions

Details
- Country: Empire of Brazil
- Made: 1841
- Owner: Imperial Museum of Brazil
- Weight: 1.9 kilograms
- Arches: 8
- Material: Gold
- Cap: Dark-green velvet
- Notable stones: 639 diamonds, 77 pearls
- Predecessors: Crown of Pedro I

The Imperial Crown of Brazil (Portuguese: Coroa Imperial do Brasil), also known as the Crown of Dom Pedro II or as the Diamantine Crown (so called because all of its precious stones are diamonds), is the Crown manufactured for the second Brazilian Emperor, Pedro II.

With the addition of this Crown to the Brazilian Imperial Regalia, use of the previous, simpler Crown of Pedro I was abandoned. The design of the Crown of Dom Pedro II also replaced the design of the older diadem in flag and coat of arms of the Brazilian Empire, thus making the new Crown the official imperial Crown of the State.

The Crown of Dom Pedro I was simpler, having been quickly manufactured in 1822 for the Coronation of Brazil's first emperor, just a few months after the declaration of the country's independence.

When Brazil's second emperor, Pedro II, was declared of age and preparations for his coronation began, the government saw the need to commission the manufacturing of a new crown.

== Manufacture ==
The Crown of Dom Pedro II was created by the goldsmith Carlos Martin in Rio de Janeiro, and was first exhibited to the public on July 8, 1841, just days before the new monarch's Coronation that took place on July 18 of the same year.

The crown's frame is made of quality 18 carat gold. Its circlet base supports eight imperial semi-arches, connected at the top by a golden monde, which in turn is surmounted by a jeweled cross, forming a globus cruciger. Inside the half-arches lies a dark-green velvet cap (matching the dark green colour of the top surface of the emperor's robe). The crown is set with 639 precious stones (all diamonds), and 77 pearls of 8 millimeters each.

This crown weighs 1.9 kilograms (4.2 lb), has a diameter of 20.5 centimetres (8.1 in) and is 31 centimetres (12 in) high. It is considered one of the most splendid works of Brazilian jewelry.

== Usage ==
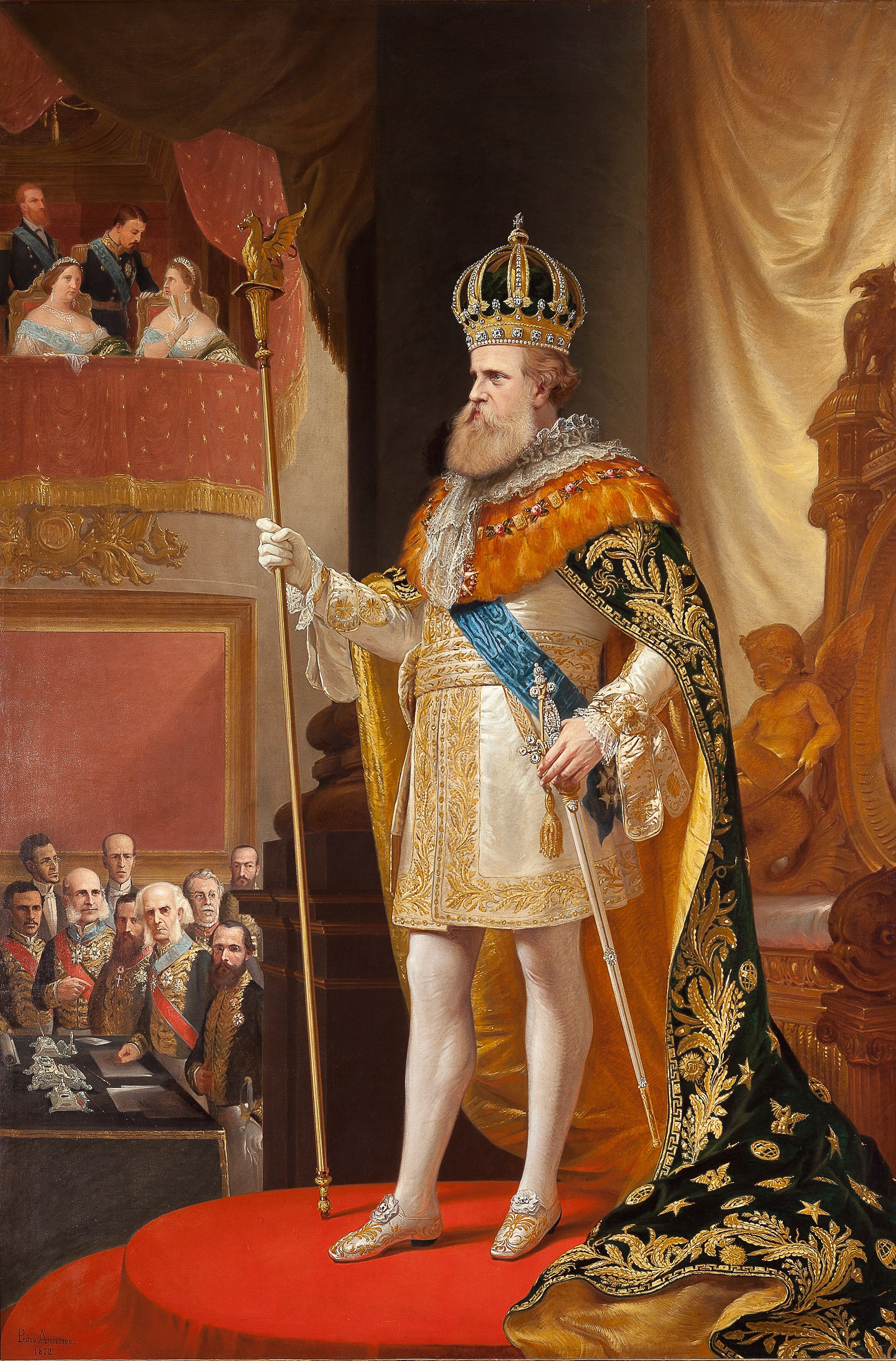
Emperor Pedro II, wearing several elements of the regalia, and crowned with the Imperial Crown of Brazil, here portrayed arriving to deliver the Speech from the Throne in the opening of the annual session of the Brazilian Imperial Parliament (General Assembly) in 1872. Painting by Pedro Américo.

President Getúlio Vargas looking at the Imperial Crown during the opening of the Imperial Museum on March 16, 1943

Aside from the Coronation Mass, it was customary for Brazilian emperors to wear their crowns only twice a year, for the ceremonies of opening and closing the session of the Brazilian Imperial Parliament, when the emperor appeared in full regalia to deliver his Speech from the Throne.

Upon the abolition of the monarchy in 1889, the government of the newly proclaimed republic took possession of all items of the Imperial Regalia, but, unlike what happened upon the abolition of other monarchies, no item of the Crown Jewels was sold or destroyed. Since 1943, the Imperial Crown of Brazil and all other items of the regalia have been kept on permanent public exhibition at the Imperial Palace in the City of Petrópolis, now converted to the Imperial Museum of Brazil.

Before the opening of the Imperial Museum in 1943, the Imperial Crown and other items of the Brazilian Crown Jewels were kept under lock and key in possession of the Department of the Treasury.

The Imperial Crown is the property of the Brazilian State.

== Replica ==
In the first years of the 21st century, Brazilian Jewellers Amsterdam Sauer created a replica of the original Imperial Crown of D. Pedro II. The creation of the replica, using 19th-century techniques not employed nowadays, took 18 months. The replica is on display at Amsterdam Sauer's Museum of Gemstones and Rare Minerals in Ipanema, Rio de Janeiro.

The replica is heavier and larger than the original crown. It weighs 2.77 kilograms (6.1 lb) and is set with 596 stones totaling 911.84 carats.
