= Imperial coronation =

Imperial coronation may refer to:

- Coronation of the Byzantine emperor
- Coronation of the Holy Roman Emperor
- Coronation of the Russian monarch
- Coronation of the Emperor of Brazil
- Coronation of Napoleon
- Coronation of Bokassa I

== See also ==
- Imperial Coronation (Fabergé egg)
