= Cross (crown) =

A cross is the decoration located at the highest level of a crown on top of the monde. Its usage traditionally symbolised the Christian nature of the monarchy of that country, though not all crowns even in monarchies associated with Christianity used a cross as its top decoration, with some French crowns using other national symbols.

While many early crowns were uncovered circlets (and some European crowns continue to have this form (see e.g. the Danish crown), from the late Middle Ages onward it became traditional to enclose the crown in a head-covering or cap, in part due to the drafty nature of the cathedrals, castles, palaces and halls where crowns were worn. To hide the cap, a series of decorative features were added; the half-arches, meeting at the monde, with the Christian nature of the crown symbolised by the use of 4 crosses pattee and the crown on top of the monde. However, not all such crowns have mondes; those of Bohemia and Hungary have crosses directly on top of them.

A decorative cross is particularly associated with the British Crown Jewels and with Papal Tiaras.

== See also ==
- Globus cruciger
