= Coronation of the Emperor of Brazil =

Religious rite of consecration

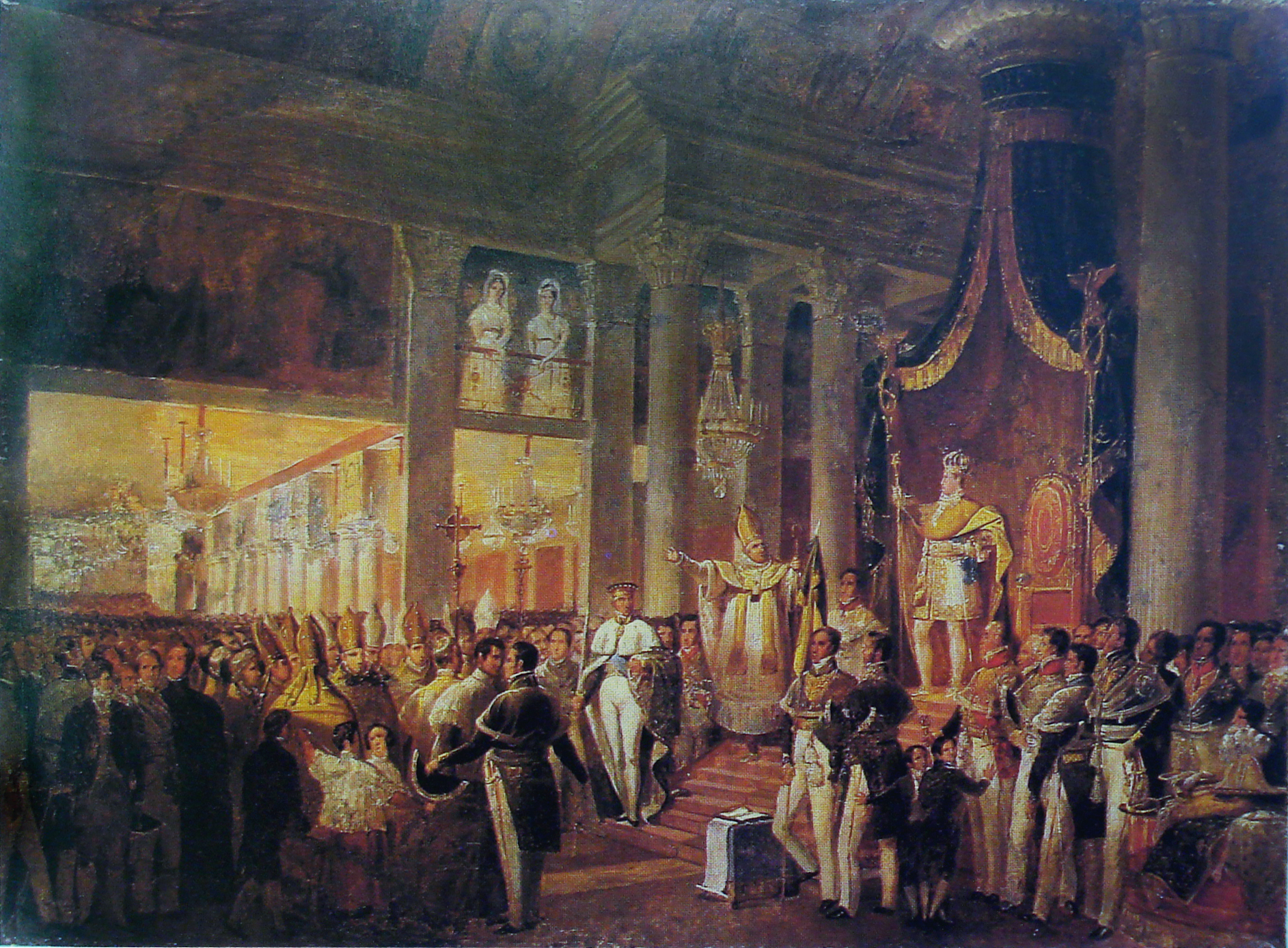
Coronation of Emperor Pedro II of Brazil in 1841. Painting by Manuel de Araújo Porto-Alegre

The emperors of Brazil were solemnly blessed, anointed, and crowned, invested with the other items of the imperial regalia and enthroned, according to the usages of the Catholic Church, the Empire's official, established Church. The coronation of the Brazilian monarch confirmed the accession of a new emperor to the throne, and corresponded to similar rites that took place in other Christian monarchies. The two Brazilian emperors, Pedro I and Pedro II, underwent the ceremony of coronation on 1 December 1822 and 18 July 1841, respectively. Those remain the two sole acts of coronation that took place in the South American continent.

== Specific usages ==
In Brazil, the rites of coronation generally followed the Roman ritual for the coronation of Kings, as prescribed by the Roman Pontifical according to its edition then in force (promulgated by Pope Benedict XIV), in its ordo titled De benedictione et coronatione Regis, but with a few modifications, such as the natural replacement of references to king and kingdom to emperor and empire, and the bestowal of a few items of regalia not contemplated in the rite of the Roman Pontifical (the delivery of an orb, the investiture with gloves and with a ring, etc.).

While, even after the codification and uniformization of the Roman Rite following the Council of Trent, certain Catholic countries retained permission to continue using their own particular coronation rites (such as the rite of coronation of the Kings of France), the Roman ritual for the coronation of kings, as codified in the Roman Pontifical (first issued under Pope Clement VIII), became the standard coronation rite for the Latin Church, given that all liturgies included in the Roman Pontifical were prescribed for general use in the entire Roman Rite. As such, this rite was available for use by the Roman Rite bishops in Brazil and by the Brazilian monarchy, and was naturally adopted, as prescribed by the liturgical laws then in force in the Catholic Church. As with all the liturgical acts of the Roman Rite of the Catholic Church at the time, the ceremony of the coronation was conducted entirely in Latin, except for the sermon, that was preached in Portuguese, the local vernacular language.

Brazil never used the rites for the coronation of a sovereign's consort, and therefore the empresses of Brazil were not crowned, including Empress Maria Leopoldina, who was already married to Pedro I at the time of his coronation, but was not crowned alongside her husband. The country also never employed the rite for the coronation of an empress regnant, because the Brazilian monarchy was abolished in 1889 by the military coup d'état that proclaimed Brazil a republic, before Princess Imperial Isabel could succeed her father on the throne.

While other countries allowed the coronation of their monarchs while still minors and under regency, in Brazil the coronation of Emperor Pedro II (who succeeded to the crown while still a minor) only took place after the emperor had been declared of age and had assumed the personal discharge of the imperial authority.

The coronation of both emperors of Brazil took place in the then Cathedral of Rio de Janeiro, now known as the Old Cathedral, that functioned as the Imperial Chapel.

The coronation of Emperor Pedro I was presided over by the Bishop of Rio de Janeiro, Major Chaplain of the Imperial Chapel, because Brazil's only Metropolitan, the Archbishop of São Salvador da Bahia, was unavailable. The coronation of Emperor Pedro II was presided by the then Metropolitan Archbishop of São Salvador da Bahia, Primate of Brazil. All Bishops of Brazil (then few in number) were summoned to attend the ceremonies of coronation. The coronation of Pedro II was attended by six bishops in addition to the Archbishop of Salvador.

== Coronation ritual ==
Detailed accounts of the coronations of the two Brazilian emperors exist, such as a very meticulous account of the coronation of emperor Dom Pedro II published by Rio de Janeiro's Jornal do Commercio newspaper on 20 July 1841 and in the works of historians Another source describing the proceedings that were to be observed in the coronation of emperor Dom Pedro I, including the ceremony for the taking of civil oaths (not prescribed in the Roman Pontifical) that were to be sworn at the conclusion of the liturgy, is the document Ceremonial of the consecration and coronation of Emperor Pedro I that is to take place in the Imperial Chapel of Our Lady of Mount Carmel on the 1st day of December of the current year, that was approved by the imperial government on 20 November 1822 and is contained in a letter addressed by the Minister for the Empire, José Bonifácio de Andrada e Silva, to the imperial court's officers of arms. The said ceremonial was published in the volume of Government Decisions of the Collection of the Laws of Brazil for the year 1822. All those ceremonials and accounts of the festivities are only lacking on the question of the music that was played during the coronation liturgy (e.g. for the entrance and departure processions, etc.)

In the Empire of Brazil era, contemporaries referred to the act of coronation as the ceremony of sagração do Imperador (consecration of the emperor), in a way similar to the French habit of calling the coronation of the French monarch le sacre du roi (the king's consecration), placing emphasis in the act of consecration and anointing over the act of crowning. More formally, the rite was known to contemporaries as the ceremony of sagração e coroação (consecration and coronation), never ceasing to mention the first aspect.

As required by the Roman Pontifical, both the 1822 and the 1841 coronations took place on Sundays and, in preparation for the solemnity, the emperor fasted on the preceding Wednesday and also on the preceding Friday and Saturday.

=== Entrance into the church ===
In the early morning the emperor (in the case of Pedro I, accompanied by the empress), left the Imperial Palace of St. Christopher, the imperial residence, and went by coach, in full state and with a large military ceremonial escort, to the Imperial Palace at the City, the formal seat of government, facing the Carmelite Convent and Rio de Janeiro's Cathedral (that also functioned as the Imperial Chapel, and was the site of the coronation). From the City Palace, the emperor and his family, preceded by heralds, kings of arms, ministers of the government and officers of state went to the cathedral in solemn procession by foot.

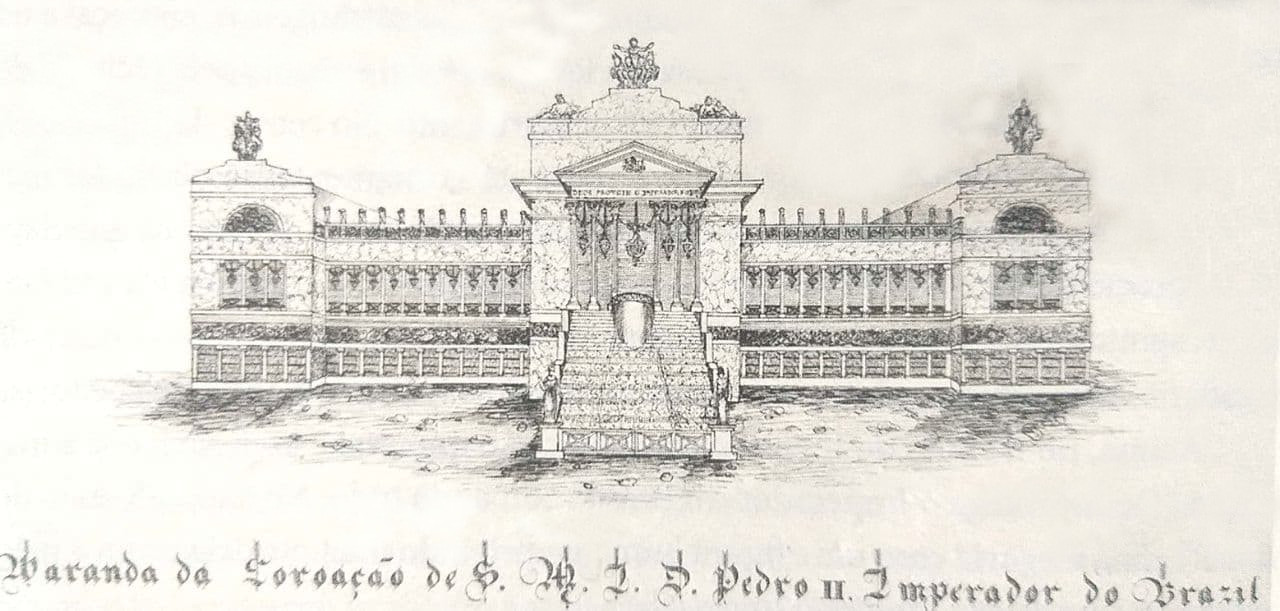
The “Varanda da Coroação” (Coronation balcony) temporary building built in 1841 for the Coronation of Pedro II: this building connected the Imperial Palace at the city to the Imperial Chapel.

Emperor Pedro II saluted the members of the diplomatic corps at the City Palace before the start of his coronation procession, and the procession started at 11:00 a.m. Emperor Pedro I crossed the short distance between the palace and the cathedral under a canopy borne by four knights. Emperor Pedro II left the church under a similar canopy, but none is mentioned at the entrance. However, for the coronation of Pedro II, a temporary building connecting the palace to the cathedral was built, the coronation balcony, and thus the second Brazilian emperor walked the distance between the city palace and the church in the view of the people, but inside the balcony.

The emperor wore the military uniform of a knight, complete with spurs, and, at the initial stage of the ceremony, the dress included armour and a knight's mantle over it, a knight's sword and a helmet with feathers (that left his face visible).

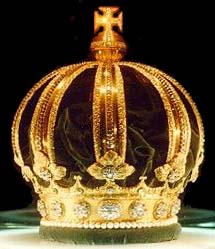
The Imperial Crown of Emperor Pedro II, made for the 1841 coronation.

Once in the church, the emperor removed his helmet, and was received near the door by the Bishop of Rio de Janeiro, Major Chaplain of the Imperial Chapel, accompanied by the canons of the cathedral. The bishop sprinkled the emperor with holy water. The emperor then replaced his helmet to walk down the aisle. As part of the entrance procession, officers of state who carried the items of the regalia delivered them to the clergy when arriving at the chancel, and the clergy placed the regalia that would later be delivered to the emperor on top of the Altar table, including the imperial sword, the crown, the gloves, the ring, the orb, the rod of the Hand of Justice and the sceptre.

Having walked down the nave, and before entering the chancel, the emperor turned left, and, removing his helmet once more, entered the Chapel of the Blessed Sacrament. There he knelt in prayer, before leaving that chapel, placing his helmet once more and entering the church's chancel. The officiating prelate awaited him in a faldstool before the altar, and the emperor was met at the chancel rails by a group of the assisting bishops, who flanked him. Members of the imperial Family, including the empress consort in the case of Pedro I and other ladies of the imperial court, took their seats the honour boxes in the second floor.

Arriving at the chancel area, the emperor then mounted the imperial throne, while the bishops and other clergy, who until then were in choir dress, were vested (the presiding prelate and his accompanying ministers – assistant priests, deacons, etc. – in vestments proper for pontifical Mass, the other bishops in cope and white mitre), while reciting the prescribed vesting prayers. The emperor's domestic chaplains who were to assist him at the throne remained in choir dress. The imperial throne was permanently present in the imperial chapel, in the chancel area, under a baldachin complete with drapes, immediately next to the steps leading to the presbytery, in the Gospel side of the chancel, that is, on the left side from the perspective of someone viewing from the nave. The bishop's cathedral and its baldachin were also in the Gospel side of the chancel, but in the sanctuary, on top of the presbytery steps, very near to the imperial throne, so that the imperial throne and the episcopal cathedra stood next to each other (although the cathedra was in a more elevated position). The throne dais had one step less than the presbytery steps, so that the throne was in an elevated position, but slightly lower than the sanctuary.

When the clergy was ready, the assisting bishops came towards the throne to invite the emperor to appear before the officiating prelate, still sitting in his faldstool at the centre of the altar. The emperor then descended from the throne, and flanked by the assisting bishops, ascended the presbytery steps and, entering the sanctuary, approached the officiating prelate, kissing his hand. Immediately before mounting the presbytery steps and entering the sanctuary, the emperor removed his helmet for the final time, and delivered it to an aide. From this point on, the emperor remained bareheaded, until the moment of his crowning.

=== The introductory rites and prayer of solemn blessing ===
The coronation rites began with the petition, made by the senior assisting bishop to the officiating prelate, asking him, in the name of the Catholic Church, to perform the coronation. A dialogue followed to confirm the suitability of the person to be crowned. After that, a chair was brought and the emperor sat while the prelate read an admonition to the excellent prince, about the duties of a sovereign. This admonition being concluded, the emperor stood, the chair was carried away, and the emperor knelt before the prelate and then took a solemn oath, known as a profession, according to the form contained in the Roman pontifical. Placing his hand on a Bible that was presented to him, the monarch confirmed the oath with the Latin words Sic me Deus adjuvet, et haec sancta Dei Evangelia, that mean, So help me God, and these holy Gospels of God.

The emperor then remained kneeling facing the altar, while the officiating archbishop or bishop, standing before the kneeling monarch, pronounced in a loud voice the prayer Omnipotens sempiterne Deus, creator omnium to bless the emperor in preparation for his anointing, which prayer was repeated in a subdued voice by the other assisting bishops, from their places, as follows:

Let us pray. Almighty and everlasting God, creator of all things, Emperor of Angels, King of kings and Lord of lords, who caused your faithful servant Abraham to triumph over his enemies, gave many victories to Moses and Joshua, the leaders of your people, exalted your humble servant David to the eminence of kingship, enriched Solomon with the ineffable gifts of wisdom and peace, hear our humble prayers, we entreat, O Lord, and upon this thy servant N., whom in prayerful devotion we elect and will consecrate as emperor, multiply the gift of your blessing (here a sign of the cross was made over the kneeling monarch); surround him always and everywhere with the strength of your right arm, that he, being firm in the faith like Abraham, endowed with meekness like Moses, armed with courage like Joshua, praiseworthy in humility like David, and distinguished with wisdom like Solomon, may please you in all things and always walk without offense in the way of inviolate justice; defended by the helmet of your protection, covered with your invincible shield and clothed with heavenly armour; may he obtain the happy triumph of victory over the enemies of the Holy Cross of Christ, cause them to fear its power, and bring peace to those who are your soldiers. Through Jesus Christ our Lord, who by the power of His Cross has destroyed hell, overcame the kingdom of the devil, ascended victorious into Heaven, and in whom subsists all power, kingship and victory, He who is the glory of the humble and the life and salvation of the peoples, Who lives and reigns with You in the unity of Holy Spirit, one God, forever and ever. Amen.

After this prayer was concluded, the emperor stood and went to the Gospel side of the altar (the left hand side from the perspective of those in the nave), where he knelt before a faldstool and prostrated his head on the cushion of the faldstool. The Litany of the Saints was then begun by the choir.

=== The Litany of the Saints and the Anointing ===
During the Litany of the Saints the presiding prelate also knelt in a faldstool at the centre of the altar, and all those present knelt in their places. The presiding prelate read the litany in a low voice while it was chanted aloud by the choir. After most of the invocations, at the point indicated by the Roman Pontifical, the choir paused, the officiating prelate stood and, with his pastoral staff in his hand, went towards the emperor, and standing before him, he recited aloud two of the invocations of the litany that were specific to the coronation rite: the first asked God deign to bless this emperor-elect who is about to be crowned (a sign of the cross being made over the emperor at the word "bless"), and the second asking God to bless and consecrate this emperor-elect who is about to be crowned (two additional signs of the cross being made over the emperor at the words "bless" and "consecrate"). After this, the officiating archbishop or bishop returned to his place and the litany was continued, being chanted by the choir until its conclusion.

After the litany, while all remained kneeling and the emperor remained prostrate, the presiding prelate rose, removed his mitre, and recited the Lord's Prayer: the words Pater noster were said aloud and the rest of the prayer was recited in silence, until the words et ne nos inducas in tentationem, that were said aloud, prompting the people to respond with the final verse of the prayer: sed libera nos a malo. A series of verses and responses then followed, several of them asking God's protection upon the emperor, his servant. After the last exchange of verse and response, the prelate proclaimed oremus (let us pray) and he, together with the other Bishops present, recited two short prayers, one asking God to grant his heavenly aid to this His servant (the emperor); the other asking God to inspire and to confirm the actions of His bishops.

At this point the officiating prelate and the other bishops resumed the use of their mitres. The emperor then rose from his prostration, and all other attendants at the coronation who were kneeling then rose as well. Then the emperor, with the help of his peers and ministers removed his collars and sash of orders of chivalry, and other insignia, removed the knight's mantle and armour, and military dress (including, in the case of Pedro II, even the knight's boots and the spurs), and stood finally, in the white trousers of the imperial court dress and a simple white linen shirt that had special openings to permit the anointings. Meanwhile, the assisting bishops formed a circle around the monarch, shielding him from general view. There the emperor knelt to be anointed by the consecrating prelate, who sat before him at the faldstool at the centre of the altar. In preparation for the anointing, a gremiale was extended over the consecrating prelate's lap by the altar servers, and the prelate, aided by the servers, removed his episcopal ring, the episcopal glove of the right hand, and then replaced the ring on the fourth finger of his bare right hand.

The presiding archbishop or bishop then dipped his right thumb in the holy oil known as the Oil of Cathecumens, and anointed the emperor in two places, both anointings being made in the form of a cross: first the unction was performed in the emperor's right forearm, between the joint of the elbow and the joint of the fist; then the emperor reclined over the prelate and was anointed in his back, between the shoulders, starting at the base of the neck. For this anointing, silver buttons at the back of the emperor's garment were opened, being closed afterwards. While performing the holy anointing, the celebrating prelate, with a clear voice, addressed the emperor with the formula Deus, Dei Filius, that was repeated in a low voice by the other bishops, in the following words:

God, the Son of God, Our Lord Jesus Christ, who was anointed by the Father with the oil of gladness above his fellows, may He himself, by this present infusion of sacred anointing pour upon your head the blessing (here a sign of the cross was made over the emperor) of the Spirit Paraclete, so that He may penetrate into the innermost recesses of your heart, in order that you receive, by this visible and material oil, invisible gifts, and, finally, having performed the just government of this temporal empire, you may merit to reign eternally with Him who alone is the sinless King of Kings, Who lives and is glorified with God the Father in the unity of God the Holy Spirit, for ever and ever. Amen.

After the anointing and the recitation of the above-mentioned formula (that, with minor changes in wording, featured also in several other rites of consecration of Christian monarchs, such as old rite for the coronation of the Holy Roman Emperor and the French, the English, and the Hungarian royal coronation rites), the gremiale was taken away by the altar servers and the presiding prelate then immediately stood and recited aloud the following prayer to God (the prayer Omnipotens sempiterne Deus, qui Hazael super Syriam...), that was repeated in a low voice by the other assistant bishops, with the emperor still kneeling, as follows:

Let us pray. Almighty everlasting God, who made to be anointed as kings, Hazael over Syria, and Jehu over Israel by [the hands of] Elijah; and also David and Saul by [the hands of] the Prophet Samuel, we beseech You, grant the strength of Your blessing to the work of our hands, and to this your servant N., whom we, though unworthy, today anointed as emperor with a sacred unction, bestow the force and efficacy of the said ointment: constitute, O Lord, the principality over his shoulders, that he be a strong, just, faithful, and prudent ruler of this Empire and of Your people; a purger of the infidels, a cultivator of justice, a rewarder of merits and repayer of faults, a defender of Your Holy Church and of the Christian faith, for the honour and praise of Your glorious Name. Through Jesus Christ our Lord, your Son, Who with You lives and reigns in the unity of the Holy Spirit, God forever and ever. Amen.

With this prayer, the consecration of the emperor was complete.

From this point onwards, the monarch was never again referred to in liturgical prayers as "emperor elect" but as "emperor". Although the Catholic coronation liturgy treated the sovereign as "the elect" on coronation day prior to the moment of his anointing and the associated consecratory prayers, under the Constitution of the Empire of Brazil and its laws an emperor succeeded to the crown and to the imperial title as soon as his predecessor died or abdicated. The consecration and coronation of the monarch, therefore, was a solemn sacramental intended to bless the sovereign and to confirm his accession to the throne, but the assumption of the imperial dignity did not depend on it.

From the perspective of religion, however, the anointing of the monarch bestowed upon him a sacred character, and the coronation rite placed him in a special position within the Catholic hierarchy. The anointed sovereign became a mixta persona: no longer fully a layman; endowed with some of the status of the clergy, but also not a clergyman, and tasked by the words of the coronation ritual with the mission of being a mediator between clergy and people. Also, the tradition of the Church viewed Christian monarchs not only as civil rulers of Christian nations, but also as defenders of the Church and helpers of the ecclesiastical authority. Furthermore, the task of governing a Christian people was understood a holy one. Thus, the coronation ritual was predicated on the view that the monarch had a sacred function, as was sacred the function of the biblical Israelite kings and of the other leaders of the Israelites mentioned in the prayers of the coronation rite. Although the coronation of a monarch is not a sacrament but a sacramental (unlike the Sacrament of Holy Orders that constitutes deacons, priests and bishops), it is still a solemn religious act of consecration, like the dedication of a new church or of an altar, the blessing of a monk as an abbot to govern a monastery or the consecration of virgins as nuns: by the said act of consecration the monarch was set apart as possessing a sacred character not equal but similar to that of the clergy, and was invested with a kingship that derived from God like the kingship of the ancient kings of Israel.

After the above-mentioned prayer, the anointings were duly purified, and the presiding prelate, removing his episcopal ring, washed his hands. He then resumed the use of the episcopal gloves and replaced the ring in the fourth finger of his right hand over the glove. Meanwhile, the emperor stood to receive the imperial vestments.

=== The vesting of the emperor ===
The rites of the anointing being concluded, newly consecrated emperor rose to his feet to be clad in the imperial vestments (the same majestic dress that was thereafter used for the opening and closing of the annual sessions of the Imperial Parliament).

The Roman Pontifical provided options for this. The newly anointed monarch could either briefly retire to the church's sacristy to put on the majestatic vestments, returning to the sacred space of the church when already dressed, or he could be dressed in the sacred space of the church itself. In the coronation of Emperor Pedro I, the first pattern was followed (with the emperor going to the sacristy and then returning to the sacred area of the church via a door in the chancel area of the chapel that connected the chancel to the sacristy), while in the coronation of Pedro II the second pattern was followed.

In either case, the emperor's officers of state attended to him and aided him in putting on the imperial vestments, including, a white robe of state in the form of a deacon's dalmatic, a sash and collar of Orders of Chivalry. As for the monarch's shoes, although Emperor Pedro I continued wearing the metal boots of a knight throughout the entire coronation ceremony, Emperor Pedro II removed his knight's boots for the anointing, and afterwards, while being dressed in his robes of state, put on white shoes that were part of his majestatic vestments and that matched his white robe. In the case of the coronation of Pedro II, that was vested in the chancel area of the cathedral, in the sight of all the attendants of the coronation ceremony, the final, most symbolic items of the imperial robes of state (the imperial mantle and the pallium), were delivered to him not by his officers of state but by the officiating archbishop. After the emperor's officers of state had clad him in the other items of the imperial vestments, the archbishop then approached the emperor, and, aided by the emperor's major chamberlain, who brought forward the imperial mantle, the prelate vested the emperor with the imperial mantle (which had a top surface of dark green velvet embroidered with gold, and was of the cloth of gold in the internal surface), and clad the emperor with the pallium over the mantle. The pallium stood over the shoulders in the manner of a mozzetta, and the mantle had a train. In the case of the coronation of Pedro I, however, when he returned from the sacristy he did so already wearing the mantle and pallium.

After the emperor was fully robed, he was led back to his throne. The major chamberlain carried the train of the imperial mantle at this time and in all the following occasions when the emperor had to walk while using the mantle. Arriving at the dais of the throne, the emperor stood there on the top of the steps but without sitting on the throne chair, accompanied by two chaplains of his household. A prie-dieu was placed in front of him, and he knelt under the canopy of the throne to hear Holy Mass, flanked by his domestic chaplains.

=== The Mass begins and is celebrated until the gradual ===
The celebrating archbishop or bishop, aided by his ministers, then started the celebration of Holy Mass, reciting the prayers at the foot of the altar, and then ascended the altar while the choir sang the introit. The Coronation Mass took the form of a Pontifical High Mass. While the celebrating prelate recited the Confiteor with his ministers, the emperor also recited the Confiteor with his domestic chaplains under the canopy of the throne, as directed by the coronation rite of the Roman Pontifical. The Coronation Mass followed the liturgical propers of the Mass of the day (including the introit antiphon, the reading of the Epistle, the gradual or tract, the reading of the Gospel, the offertory antiphon, the preface and the communion antiphon), but, at the occasions of the collect prayer, the secret prayer, and the prayer after Communion, special prayers for the emperor, prescribed in the coronation rite of the Roman Pontifical, were recited after the normal prayers of the liturgy of the day contained in the Roman Missal. Those special collect, secret and postcommunion prayers for the monarch were the same ones that are prescribed in the Roman Missal for the votive Missa pro Rege (Mass for the King), with the natural replacement of all mentions of "king" for "emperor".

Because the coronation always took place on a Sunday, as required by the Roman Pontifical, the Gloria was sung after the Kyrie (except if the liturgy took place in the penitential liturgical seasons of Lent, Septuagesima or Advent) and the Niceno-Constantinopolitan Creed was sung after the reading of the Gospel. After the Gloria and the Collect of the day, the special Collect for the emperor was as follows:

We humbly ask, all powerful God, that your servant N., our emperor, who by your mercy received the government of this Empire, may receive also the increase of all virtues, and that through them he may avoid all the monstrous vices, and that he may with grace arrive unto you, who are the way, the truth and life. Through Our Lord Jesus Christ, your Son, who with You lives and reigns in the unity of the Holy Spirit, God, for ever and ever. Amen.

The celebration of Mass was then continued until and excluding the 'Alleluia' before the Gospel (or, when there was no Alleluia due to the liturgical season, until and excluding the last verse of tract, or, when appropriate, until and excluding the sequence preceding the Gospel). Therefore, after the reading of the Epistle and the chanting of the Gradual, the normal liturgy of the Mass was interrupted, and the specific ceremonies of the coronation were resumed, so that the delivery of the imperial insignia, including the emperor's actual coronation and enthronement, took place within the celebration of the Eucharist.

The Roman Pontifical only provided for three instruments of State to be handed to the Soveregin: the sword, the Crown and the Sceptre, in this order, each with a formula of delivery prescribed by the rubrics of the rite. However, in practice, other regalia were delivered as well, after the Crowning and before the investiture with the Sceptre, namely the bestowal of the ring, the gloves, the orb and the rod of the Hand of Justice. Those additional Crown Jewels were delivered without any form of words, as opposed to those that formed official part of the liturgical "traditio instrumentorum".

=== Mass is interrupted: the investiture with the sword ===
Once the Mass was paused after the Gradual, the emperor, who until then remained kneeling, reading and listening to the Mass together with his domestic chaplains under the canopy of the throne, stood and descended from the throne dais, and, accompanied by the assistant bishops, entered the presbytery and presented himself once more to the celebrating archbishop or bishop, kissing his hand. Meanwhile, the prelate had descended from the Episcopal cathedra and had sat once more at the faldstool at the centre of the altar. The emperor then knelt before the presiding prelate, to be invested with the imperial sword. The prelate stood to perform this ceremony. A deacon brought the sword from the altar in its scabbard, and presented it to the Minister of War, who removed it from its scabbard and delivered it to the celebrating archbishop or bishop, who took it by the blade and presented it to the emperor, who took it by its base, while the celebrating prelate pronounced the long and very ancient formula for the delivery of the sword, Accipe gladium de Altare sumptum per nostras manus..., in the following words:

Receive from our hands that, though unworthy, have yet been consecrated to be in the place and discharge the authority of the holy Apostles, the sword brought from the Altar, which is given to you as emperor, and which, as ordained by God, is dedicated by our blessing (here a sign of the Cross was made) to the defence of the Holy Church of God; and be mindful of what the Psalmist prophesied, saying "Gird yourself with your sword upon your thigh, O most mighty one", that by it you may exercise the force of equity, mightily destroy the growth of iniquity, protect and advance the Holy Church of God and its faithful people; no less than you shall pursue and disperse the false faithful and the enemies of the Christian name; mercifully help and defend widows and orphans, restore those things which have fallen into decay and maintain those things that were restored, avenge injustices and confirm good dispositions; that, in so doing, you may be glorious by the triumph of virtue, and be an eminent cultivator of justice, that you may merit to reign without end with the Saviour of the world, Who lives and reigns with God the Father and the Holy Spirit, one God, for ever and ever. Amen.

After this formula was recited, the emperor gave the sword back to the officiating archbishop or bishop, who gave it back to the deacon, who gave it back to the Minister of War, who placed it in its scabbard. And then the Minister of War returned the sword, in its scabbard, to the deacon, who returned it to the celebrating prelate, who tied it to the emperor's waist by the left thigh, and after the emperor was thus girded with the sword, the prelate pronounced the formula Accingere gladio tuo, etc., in the following words:

Gird yourself with your sword upon your thigh, O most mighty one, and beware that the Saints conquered kingdoms not through the sword, but by the Faith.

The emperor then arose, and removed the sword from its scabbard, and made vibrations and motions with it in the air and passed with the blade through his left arm as though cleansing it, and then replaced the sword in the scabbard at his thigh, and knelt once more.

=== The crowning of the emperor ===
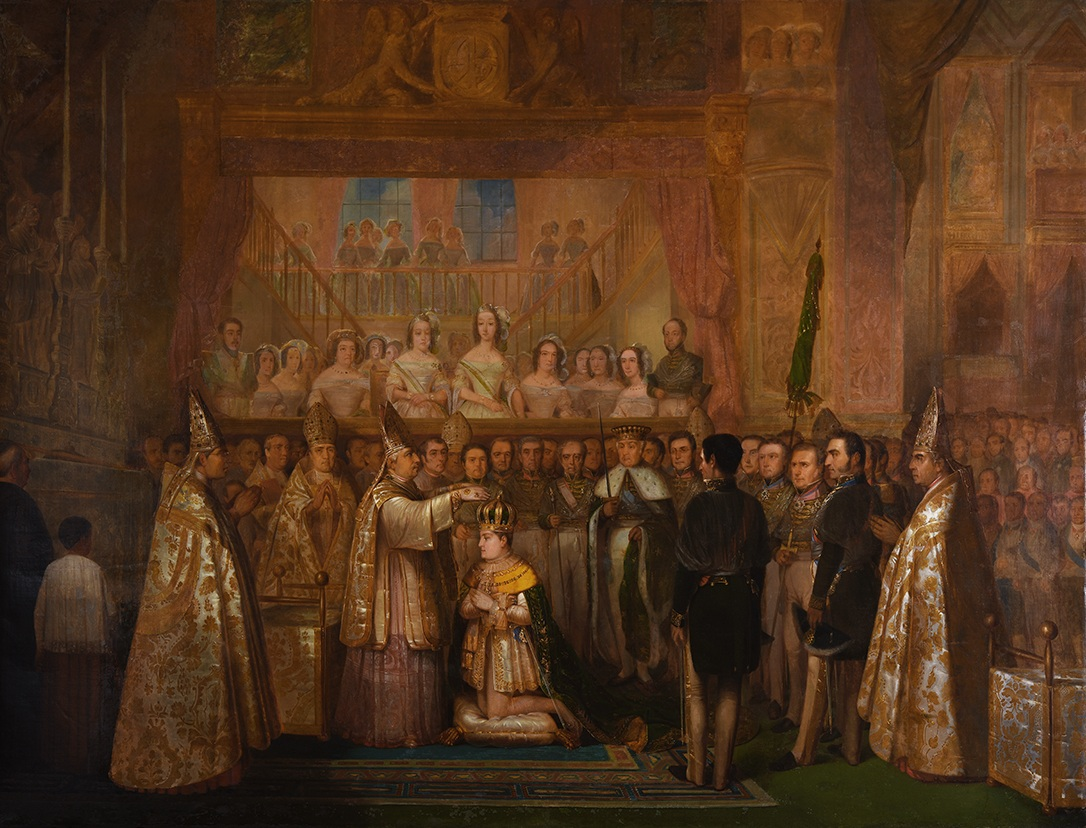
The crowning of Emperor Pedro II, 18 July 1841.

All the assisting bishops then gathered around the emperor in the form of a circle, while the celebrating archbishop or bishop went to the altar himself to pick up the imperial crown. The emperor, still kneeling, was then reverently crowned by the celebrating prelate, in the Name of the Most Holy Trinity, and all the bishops placed their hands on top of the crown, while the presiding prelate recited aloud the formula Accipe coronam imperii... (Receive the crown of the Empire...), that was recited also in a subdued voice by the other bishops, and as the names of each of the Three Divine Persons were spoken, signs of the Cross were made over the newly crowned emperor to bless his crowning, as follows:

Receive the Crown of the Empire, that by the hands of us bishops, though unworthy, is imposed upon your head (at this point the crown was lowered at the head of the monarch by the celebrating archbishop or bishop and he and the other bishops placed their hands upon it), in the name of the Father (at this point all prelates made a first sign of the cross over the crowned emperor), and of the Son (at this point a second sign of the cross was made), and of the Holy Spirit (at this point a third sign of the cross was made); and know that it signifies the glory of holiness, honour, and righteousness, and do not ignore that by it you become a partaker in our ministry; so that, just as we are in the internal forum pastors and rectors of souls, so be you in the external forum a sincere worshiper of God and a strenuous defender assisting the Church of Christ against all adversities; and may you show yourself to be a useful trustee and a profitable ruler of the Empire that God has given you and committed to your government by means of our blessing as placeholders of the Apostles and with the aid of all the saints; so that, ornamented with the jewels of the virtues, and crowned with the reward of everlasting happiness, you may have among the glorious athletes a glory without end with our Saviour and Redeemer, Jesus Christ, in whose Name and place you believe to govern, Who lives and rules, one God, with the Father and the Holy Spirit, forever and ever. Amen.

After the crowning proper, the bishops removed their hands from the crown and the emperor, still kneeling, received the other items of the regalia.

=== The delivery of the regalia: gloves, ring, orb, rod of the Hand of Justice and sceptre ===
Once the crowning was concluded, the emperor remained kneeling and received several items of Regalia without any form of words being said, because those items of Regalia were not prescribed in the Roman Pontifical. The first of those items were the adorned white gloves for both hands of the emperor, followed by the delivery of the imperial ring. A deacon brought from the Altar to the presiding prelate a silver plate with the emperor's gloves and a case containing the imperial ring. The presiding archbishop or bishop then vested the emperor with the gloves, and immediately thereafter placed the ring in the fourth finger of the emperor's right hand, over the glove. The same deacon then went up to the altar, and brought the imperial orb, and presented it to the presiding prelate, who delivered it to the emperor. After holding it for a while, the emperor delivered the orb to his Minister of Foreign Affairs. Afterwards, the same deacon went to the altar and picked up the rod of the Hand of Justice (main de Justice), and presented it to the celebrating prelate, who delivered it to the kneeling emperor. The emperor then handed the Rod of the Hand of Justice to his Justice Minister.

After the delivery of those items of regalia, the emperor then received a final insignia, that was foreseen in the Roman Pontifical, and for which, therefore, a form of words of investiture was prescribed: the sceptre. The same deacon went up the steps of the altar, and brought from the altar table the very large sceptre, and presented it to the celebrating Archbishop or bishop, who delivered it to the emperor, who took it with his right hand. The presiding prelate then recited the formula for the delivery of the sceptre, Accipe virgam virtutis, etc., in the following words:

Receive the rod of virtue and truth and understand that with it you must encourage the pious and intimidate the reprobate; guide the straying; lend a hand to the fallen; repress the proud and raise the humble; and may Our Lord Jesus Christ open to you the door, He who said of himself, "I am the Door, whoever enters by me, by me shall be saved," and let Him who is the Key of David and the sceptre of the House of Israel be your helper: He Who opens and no one may shut, Who shuts and no one may open; and let Him be your guide, Who brings the captive out of prison, where he seats in darkness and the shadow of death; that in all things you may imitate Him, of whom the Prophet David said, "Your seat, O God, endures forever; a rod of righteousness is the rod of your kingdom". Imitating Him, may you love justice and hate iniquity. For that purpose God, your God, has anointed you, after the example of Him who before the centuries was anointed with the oil of gladness above His fellows, Jesus Christ, Our Lord, Who with Him lives and reigns, God, for ever and ever. Amen.

After the delivery of the imperial insignia was complete, the emperor rose to his feet, and, aided by his officers of state, removed the imperial sword, in is scabbard, from his waist. The emperor handed the sword, in its adorned scabbard, to his Minister of War, who thus bore it in its scabbard before the emperor for the remainder of the ceremony.

=== The enthronement and the Te Deum ===
The Ministers carrying the sword, the orb, and the rod of the Hand of Justice then stood on the side steps next to the emperor's throne. The emperor, with the crown on his head, the sceptre in his right hand, and wearing his full majestatic dress (his pallium, mantle and other robes of State) and also the gloves on both hands and the ring on the fourth finger of his right hand, then proceeded towards his throne, led by all the Bishops. The officiating prelate walked to the emperor's right, and the senior assistant prelate to the emperor's left. Aided by the bishops, the emperor ascended the steps of the throne, and, under the canopy, the emperor was placed at the throne chair by the two highest ranking prelates: the celebrating prelate held the emperor's right arm and the senior assistant prelate his left arm while seating the emperor on the throne. Once the emperor was seated, the prelates removed their hands from his arms. The emperor was thus enthroned. As soon as the monarch had taken his seat upon the throne, the presiding prelate, addressing him, recited the formula of enthronement, Sta et retine, etc.:

Stay firm and hold fast to the place delegated to you by God, by the authority of Almighty God, and by this our present transmission, that is to say, of all the bishops and of other servants of God; and when you see the clergy draw near to the holy altar, remember to give them appropriate honour, so that the Mediator between God and humanity may confirm you in this position as the mediator between clergy and people.

After the enthronement, the presiding prelate and the other bishops went to the altar, and the presiding prelate, ascending the steps of the altar and facing it, removed his mitre and intoned the solemn hymn of praise and thanksgiving Te Deum laudamus, that was continued by the choir. The officiating prelate read the hymn in silence continuously and quickly while the initial verses were still being chanted by the choir in polyphony. After finishing his quiet reading of the hymn at the altar and while the choir was still singing the same hymn, the presiding prelate left the altar and returned to the emperor's throne, standing at one of the steps of the throne at the emperor's right hand side. There the officiating prelate waited the conclusion of the singing of the Te Deum by the choir. While all the guests and participants of the coronation remained standing, the emperor remained seated in his throne, crowned and holding the sceptre.

Once the singing of the Te Deum was concluded, the celebrating archbishop or bishop recited a few verses over the emperor, while the clergy and people present recited the responses. The first exchange was: V. Let your hand be strengthened and your right hand be exalted; R. Let justice and judgment be the foundations of your throne. Those exchanges being finished, the officiating prelate recited two solemn prayers. During those prayers the emperor stood from the throne chair, and the archbishop remained next to him and to his right, at the steps of the throne, looking towards the Altar. The first of those two prayers was the prayer God who gave Moses victory... (Deus qui victrices Moysi...); and the second was the prayer, God, inexplicable author of the world... (Deus, inenarrabilis auctor mundi...). While the first prayer was for the whole people, the second prayer was an additional petition of God's blessings specifically for the newly crowned emperor, and while reciting it twice the presiding prelate produced the sign of the cross towards the monarch as an act of benediction. This prayer for the emperor had the following form of words:

Let us pray. God, inexplicable author of the world, creator of the humankind, confirmer of kingdoms, Who from the descendants of Your faithful friend, our Patriarch Abraham, pre-ordained the future King of the centuries to come, may You deign to enrich this illustrious emperor here present, together with his army, with an abundant blessing (here the sign of the cross was made towards the emperor), by the intercession of the blessed ever Virgin Mary, and of all the saints, and unite him in firm stability to the imperial throne; visit him, as you visited Moses in the [burning] bush, Joshua in battle, Gideon in the field and Samuel in the Temple; bestow upon him same blessing (here the sign of the cross was again made towards the emperor) from on high, and the same infusion with the dew of Your wisdom, that the blessed David, in the Plsalter, and Solomon his son, received from Heaven, by Your concession. May You be for him an armour against the enemy hosts, a helmet in adversity, wisdom in prosperity, a perpetual shield of protection. And grant that the peoples remain faithful unto him; his peers maintain peace; love charity, abstain from greed, speak with justice, guard the truth, and thus may this people under his empire grow, united by the blessing of eternity, so that, always in triumph, they remain in peace, and victorious. This may He vouchsafe to grant, Who with You lives and reigns in unity with the Holy Spirit, forever and ever. Amen.

=== The Coronation Mass resumed: from the Gospel until its conclusion ===
Once the said prayers were finished, the celebrating archbishop or bishop left the right hand side of the monarch at the steps of the throne and returned to the altar. The celebration of the Mass was resumed from the point where it had been interrupted after the Gradual, that is to say, with the recitation of the Alleluia, or of the last verse of tract, or of the sequence. A prie-dieu was again placed in front of the throne, so that the emperor could kneel when appropriate, and, while the other sacred ministers were at the altar, the emperor's domestic chaplains again attended to him at the throne. For the reading of the Gospel, the emperor stood and removed the crown, that was delivered to one of his officers of state who stood on the side steps of the throne, bearing the crown on a cushion. At the end of the Gospel reading, the Gospel book was brought to the throne by the reading deacon for the emperor to kiss, a ceremony not prescribed by the Roman Pontifical, but that was customary in solemn Masses in the presence of the emperor. The emperor resumed the use of the crown once the reading of the Gospel was finished and after having kissed the Gospel book. After the Gospel there was no homily (a sermon was preached after the conclusion of the Mass), and the Mass continued as usual in the Tridentine form, with the recitation of the Nicene Creed followed by the offertory.

At the offertory, after the initial prayers, and after the celebrating prelate had censed the offerings of bread and wine, the cross at the Altar, and the Altar itself, and after he handed the thurible to the deacon and was incensed himself, but before the washing of hands, the normal rite of Mass was again paused for a brief special ceremony in which the emperor presented gifts to the Church: the celebrating prelate went to his cathedra (in the case of the coronation of Pedro I, presided by the Bishop of Rio), or to a faldstool at the altar (in the case of the coronation of Pedro II, presided by the Archbishop of Salvador), and there waited for the emperor, who came from his throne, fully vested as always, and with the crown on his head and the sceptre in his right hand. Kneeling before the celebrating prelate, the emperor received from his officers of state a lit candle encrusted with gold coins, and delivered that candle to the prelate as a gift. The emperor also donated two pieces in the form of bread, one of gold, the other of silver. And after presenting the gifts, the emperor kissed the prelate's hand, rose to his feet, returned to the throne, and the liturgy of the Mass continued, with the celebrating prelate returning to the Altar for the rite of washing of hands.

In the incensations by the deacon that followed the washing of the hands of the celebrant, the emperor was incensed separately from the people, and before them. Once all ceremonies of the offertory were concluded, a special secret prayer was recited for the emperor after the day's proper secret.

At the dialogue introducing the Preface, as the bishops removed their skullcaps and stood bareheaded in preparation for the consecration of the Eucharist, the emperor removed his crown and delivered it to be held by the same officer of state who bore it during the Gospel reading. The emperor also delivered his sceptre to another aide. The emperor remained without crown or sceptre until the Communion, and resumed their use immediately before the postcommunion prayer. At the Sanctus the emperor knelt for the Canon of the Mass as usual, and remained kneeling at the prie-dieu at the throne dais until the conclusion of the Eucharistic Prayer. After the Roman Canon, Mass continued normally, with the Pater Noster and the prayers that followed, the emperor standing or kneeling when appropriate.

The ceremony of the kiss of peace took place and, for this ceremony, as expressly directed by the Coronation rite prescribed in the Roman Pontifical, an instrumentum pacis was used, the Emperor receiving the greeting from the senior assistant Bishop.

For the reception of Holy Communion, after the celebrating archbishop or bishop had taken communion under the appearances of bread and wine, and after the rites in preparation for the communion of the faithful had taken place, the emperor descended from the throne and went to the altar. There, by special privilege, he ascended the altar steps, and, arriving near to the altar table, he knelt at the altar's highest step to receive Communion. He then kissed the celebrating Prelate's hand, and received the Eucharist, under the species of bread alone (as usual for the lay faithful and even for the clergy other than the celebrant). Though a few other coronation rites contained special privileges allowing for the reception of Communion under both kinds by the monarch on coronation day (such as the rite of coronation of the kings of France), the general coronation rite of the Roman Pontifical did not contemplate this. On the contrary, the rubrics of the Roman Pontifical expressly reiterated that the celebrant should drink the whole of the Eucharist under the appearance of wine, so that the monarch, though allowed to ascend to the altar, received Communion only under the appearance of bread.

Only the celebrating prelate and the emperor received Communion during the Coronation Mass. After receiving Communion and consuming the Sacred Host, and after having said in silence his private devotional prayers customary upon the reception of the Eurcharist, and while the Communion antiphon was still being chanted by the choir, the emperor, still kneeling at the highest step of the Altar, performed ablutions with the chalice, that was then presented to him by the celebrating prelate. The celebrant also performed ablutions, and drank the contents of the chalice.

Returning to the throne, the emperor resumed the use of his crown and sceptre, and rose from the throne chair to hear the prayers after Communion. After the prayer of the day, a special postcommunion prayer was recited for the emperor

Mass thereafter continued normally until its conclusion. For the Last Gospel, the emperor again, for the third and last time, removed his crown, and remained uncrowned until the conclusion of the sermon that followed the Mass, the promulgation of indulgences and the imparting of the solemn blessing, as described below, resuming the use of the crown as soon as the blessing was given.

=== After the Mass: final rites in the Church ===
==== The sermon and the solemn final blessing ====
Immediately after the Last Gospel, the Mass being finished, a sermon was preached. The emperor, without crown as described above, but holding the sceptre, sat on the throne to hear the sermon. The sermon for the coronation of Pedro I was preached by the friar preacher of the imperial household, and the sermon for the coronation of Pedro II was preached by the abbot general of the Order of St. Benedict in Brazil. The theme of this last sermon was the anointing of Solomon by Zadok the Priest and Nathan the Prophet.

After the sermon, the indulgences granted by the presiding prelate were announced, and the prelate imparted upon all those present the solemn pontifical blessing, according to the form contained in the Roman Pontifical for use in special occasions. The rubrics of this promulgation of indulgences and solemn blessing were contained in the Roman Pontifical under the heading Ritus et Formula Absolutionis et Benedictionis Pontificalis post homiliam seu sermonem infra Missae solemnis celebratione. The rubrics of the coronation rite also specifically called for this blessing to be given at the end of the coronation liturgy.

Once the solemn pontifical blessing was given, the emperor resumed the use of his crown. The said blessing concluded the liturgical acts of the coronation.

After the solemn blessing, in the case of the coronation of Pedro II, the emperor commanded the exit procession to start, and in procession departed the church.

==== The civil oaths at the coronation of Pedro I in 1822 ====
In the case of the 1822 coronation of Emperor Pedro I, however, the liturgy of the coronation proper was followed by oaths that were taken by the emperor and by representatives of the people, still inside the church. Only after those oaths were taken, Emperor Pedro I commanded the exit procession to start and departed the church.

Those oaths taken at the conclusion of Pedro I's coronation were religious in character, because they were made on the Gospels in the presence of the clergy and inside the cathedral where the coronation had taken place, but they were not composed by the Church, and they should not be confused with the oath known as the profession, made by the emperor during the introductory rites of the coronation ceremony. The profession made at the initial stages of the coronation rite is a liturgical oath, and its text is prescribed by the Church in the Roman Pontifical. On the other hand, the oaths taken at the conclusion of Pedro I's coronation were neither liturgical nor prescribed by the Church, being instead oaths instituted by the imperial government, that is, by the civil authority.

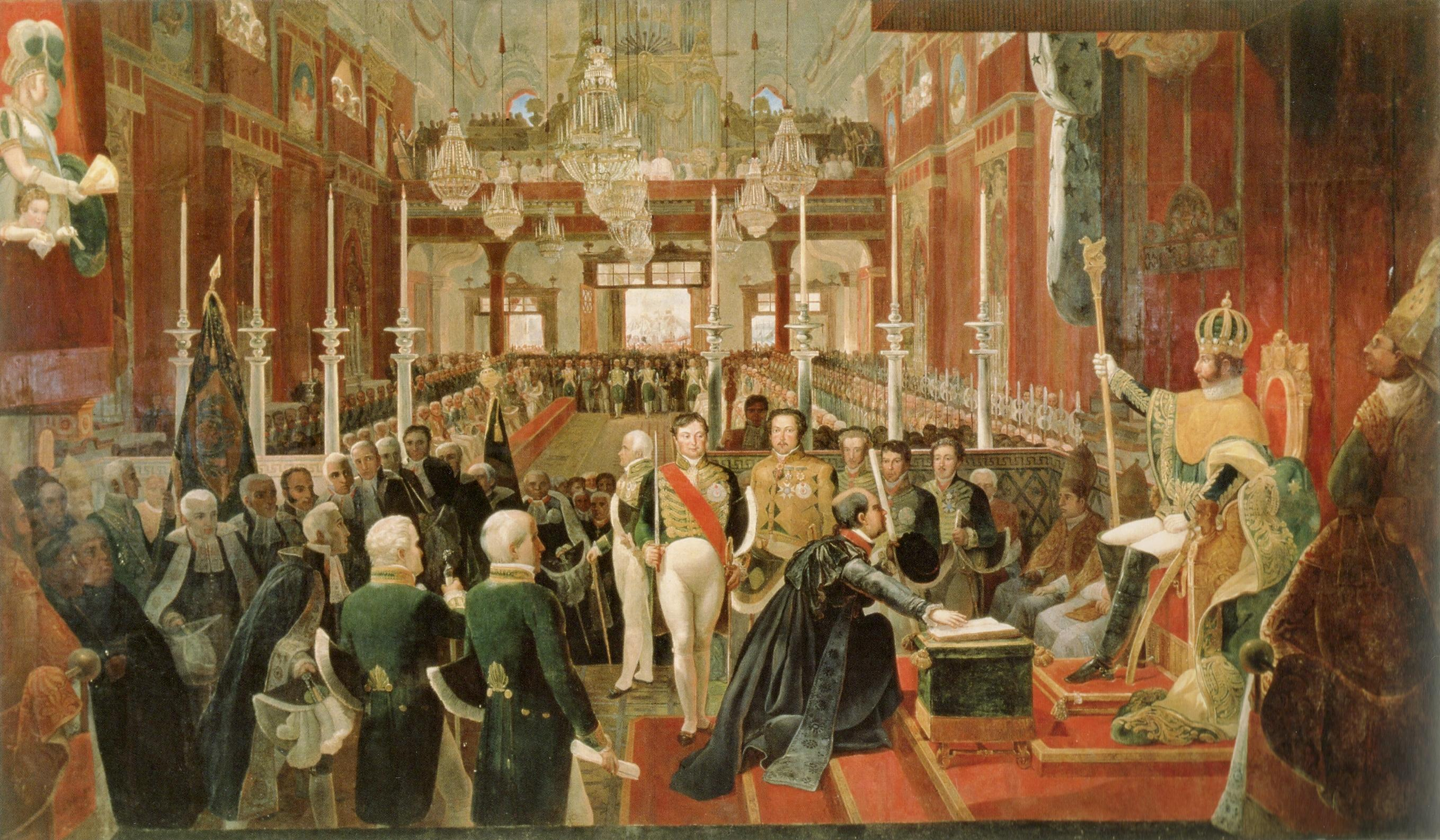
Coronation of Pedro I of Brazil on 1 December 1822: José Clemente Pereira, presiding officer of Rio de Janeiro's city council, takes the oath of allegiance before the newly crowned emperor, who sits on the throne wearing his crown and holding his sceptre. Empress Maria Leopoldina and Princess Maria da Glória watch from the honour box at the second floor, opposite the throne. Painting by Jean-Baptiste Debret

The two oaths made by Pedro I at his coronation had a different focus, contemplating a different set of promises. The ecclesiastical oath before the prayer of solemn blessing, the litany of the saints and the anointing was a traditional, centuries-old vow that focused on the rights of the Church and on a generic pledge by the monarch to honour and to do good by his nobles and other subjects. The civil oath taken still at the cathedral but immediately after the conclusion of the coronation liturgy was a promise to rule according to law and to abide by the future Constitution that would be adopted for the Empire. Therefore, the two oaths taken by Emperor Pedro I at his coronation complemented each other, as the promises made in the civil oath added to those of the ecclesiastical vow.

No such civil oaths were taken at the conclusion of Pedro II' coronation in 1841, because in 1840 he had already taken, before the Imperial Parliament, the oath prescribed by article 102 of the Empire's Constitution.

Therefore, in the coronation of Pedro II, the sermon and the final blessing were immediately followed by the exit procession and by the emperor's departure from the Church, whereas in the coronation of Pedro I the sermon and the final blessing were followed by the ceremony of the taking of the civil oaths.

This ceremony took place as follows. Aides brought a credence table to the dais of the throne. This table was placed on top of the steps, in front of the throne but to its right and not at the centre of the dais, with the emperor still sitting on the throne chair, with the crown on his head and holding his sceptre. The Book of the Gospels was placed on the said table. The Bishop Major Chaplain, who had presided over the coronation, then took the book of the Gospels and brought it to the emperor. The Minister of Justice prompted the emperor to recite the words of the oath: the said minister made a profound reverence to the emperor and read the formula of the emperor's oath, that was repeated by the emperor from his throne chair. While taking the oath, the seated emperor placed his hand on the Gospel book that was held by the Bishop Major Chaplain. This was followed by acclamations prompted by the king of arms, that were repeated by all those present at the cathedral.

After the said acclamations, the attorneys-general representing the provinces of the empire, the president and members of Rio's city council and the representatives sent by other municipal councils were led from their places to the front of the throne, below the steps. It is worth noting that Pedro I's coronation took place in 1822 just a few months after he declared Brazil's independence from Portugal and was acclaimed as emperor, and before a Parliament could be elected. Therefore, Brazil still lacked a national Legislature, and the members of the council of attorneys-general of the provinces, the members of the capital's municipal council and the representatives of the other municipal councils that sent delegates to attend the coronation acted as the representatives of the people.

The Gospel Book was again placed on the table in front of the throne. The Minister of Justice then read aloud the formula of the collective oath of the provincial attorneys-general, members of Rio's city council and representatives sent by other municipal councils. That oath was promise of allegiance to the newly crowned emperor and his successors and to the laws of the Empire. Immediately thereafter those officers, one by one, bowing to the emperor, ascended the steps of the throne, and, kneeling at the highest step before the above-mentioned table, placed their hands on the Gospel Book and confirmed their acceptance of the oath of allegiance that the Minister had read by saying "I do so swear". Each officer then rose and descended from the throne steps.

The texts of the oaths prescribed by the imperial government to be taken by Emperor Pedro I and by the provincial attorneys-general, members of Rio's city council and representatives of other councils were published in a government decision dated 27 November 1822 that is included in the official collection of the Empire's legislation. The oath taken by Emperor Pedro I was worded in Latin and the oath taken by the officers representing the people was worded in Portuguese.

After all the officers who were required to take the oath of allegiance had done so, Emperor Pedro I commanded the start of the exit procession, and departed from the cathedral.

=== Ceremonies and festivities outside the church ===
For the exit procession, all participants of the cortège left the cathedral in the same order of their entrance. The emperor, from the moment he descended the throne steps to enter the procession, was flanked by knights who bore a canopy over his head, and he remained under that pall for the duration of the cortège. The emperor's departure from the church was followed by other ceremonies, that in the case of the coronation of Pedro I took place inside the Imperial Palace of the city, and in the case of the coronation of Pedro II took place in the temporary building connecting the church to the palace, and known as coronation balcony.

The first of those ceremonies was an act of homage to the newly crowned emperor by his ecclesiastical and lay subjects: with the emperor still crowned and sitting on a throne (in the throne room of the palace, in the case of Pedro I, or in a hall of the coronation Balcony, in the case of Pedro II), the clergy that took part in the coronation passed by, stopped facing the throne, bowed deeply, from the waist, and chanted, one by one, the Latin formula "Ad multos annos", meaning for many years.

After this act of homage by the clergy, the homage of the lay subjects took place, with a different format that took the form of a baciamano: Ministers, officers of state and nobles came and passed in front of the throne, performing their act of homage by ascending the steps to the throne, genuflecting and kissing the emperor's hand, before descending the steps of the throne. This act of homage by kissing hands as a sign of fidelity and obedience was known in Portuguese as beija-mão.

After those acts of homage were concluded, the emperors presented themselves to the public: Emperor Pedro II approached the front of the coronation Balcony, and Emperor Pedro I went to a palace balcony. With the emperor in full view of the people, wearing his robes, crown and sceptre, heralds sounded trumpets, drums beat, banners were unruffled, and a king of arms proclaimed that the emperor's consecration and coronation was accomplished. As part of this proclamation, the emperor's title was declared in full, and triple acclamations were prompted. After the acclamations, gun salutes followed, amidst other spontaneous popular acclamations.

Leaving the balcony, the emperor then went to a hall where, seating on a throne, he received for a baciamano other civil servants, senators, members of the Chamber of Deputies and members of the imperial orders, ladies of distinction, etc., and other invited guests. For this reception of people who greeted the emperor after his balcony appearance, he was already divested of the crown, which was placed on a cushion next to the throne. Afterwards, the emperor received in the throne room of the imperial palace of the city delegations (from the city council of Rio de Janeiro, from the Senate, from the Chamber of Deputies, etc.) who came to present their loyal addresses commemorating the coronation.

Later, having removed his robes of state, but wearing gala uniform, the emperor offered a banquet to his guests. Pedro II's coronation banquet was served in the City Palace at 6 p.m. A dinner for all functionaries of the imperial household was served after the imperial banquet. In the case of the 1841 coronation, from 8 p.m. until 10 p.m., after the coronation banquet was concluded and Emperor Pedro II had retired to his private apartments at the City Palace, ordinary members of the public who were decently dressed were allowed to visit the adjoining coronation balcony building and to view the Crown Jewels on display.

Finally, after spending a few days in the City Centre for a programme of festivities commemorating the Coronation, the emperor and his family returned to the Imperial Palace of St. Christopher.
