= Crown of Pedro I =

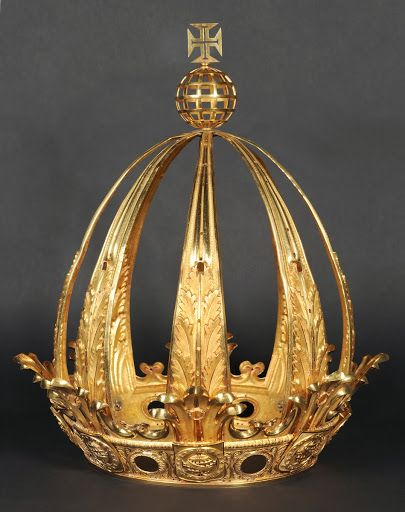
- The Crown of Pedro I without the ornaments that were removed to make the crown of Pedro II of Brazil.

Heraldic depictions

Details
- Country: Empire of Brazil
- Made: 1822
- Owner: Imperial Museum of Brazil
- Weight: 2.6 kilograms
- Arches: 8
- Material: Gold, diamonds
- Cap: Dark-green velvet
- Notable stones: 639 diamonds, 77 pearls
- Successors: Imperial Crown of Brazil

The crown of Pedro I is the first imperial crown of Brazil and was made for emperor Pedro I of Brazil. It was made in 1822 for his coronation and was the symbol and emblem of Brazilian imperial power until it was replaced in 1841 by the crown of his son and successor Pedro II. It is one of the jewels of the Brazilian Empire and is now on display at the Imperial Museum in Petrópolis.

== History ==
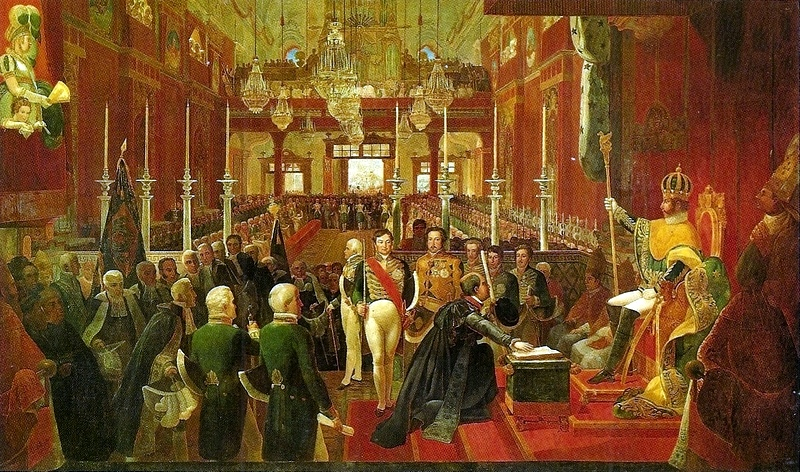
Coronation of Peter I of Brazil in 1828. Painting by Jean-Baptiste Debret.

In 1807, fearing Napoleonic invasions in Portugal, Prince Regent John decided to transfer the government to Brazil to be safe and keep his most valuable colony. The court acclimated so well to this state that in 1815, as the threat of Napoleon receded to Saint Helena, the regent decided to remain in Brazil and make it a kingdom in its own right within the United Kingdom of Portugal, Brazil and the Algarves. However, in 1820 a serious political crisis broke out in Portugal, forcing John VI to return to Lisbon. Before leaving, he appointed the crown prince Pedro as regent of Brazil.

Concerned about the evolution of Brazil, the Portuguese political elites wanted to return it to its former colonial status and dissolve its government. However, when they ordered Pedro to return to Portugal, he decided to stay during the Dia do Fico, and supported the break with the Portuguese metropolis. Pedro declared the independence of Brazil by the cry of Ipiranga on 7 September 1822, accepting to become emperor of Brazil only on October 12, and was crowned as such on December 1. There followed three years of struggles that ended with the Treaty of Rio de Janeiro by which Portugal officially recognized Brazilian independence.

The Brazilian aristocracy had its wish: Brazil made a transition to independence with comparatively little disruption and bloodshed. But this meant that independent Brazil retained its colonial social structure: monarchy, slavery, large landed estates, monoculture, an inefficient agricultural system, a highly stratified society, and a free population that was 90 percent illiterate.

In 1841, for the coronation of Pedro II, son and heir of Pedro I, a new imperial crown was created as if to mark a new beginning. For this purpose, the diamonds on the crown of Pedro I were removed and placed on the new model. After that, the first crown was only shown as a symbol of the foundation of the empire and no longer played a real role in imperial propaganda. The last real political use of the crown took place in 1972 during the repatriation of the remains of Pedro I to Brazil, where it was displayed on a cushion.

== Manufacture ==
The crown was made in 1822 by Brazilian silversmith Manuel Inácio de Loiola in Rio de Janeiro, and was first exhibited to the public on 8 July 1841, just days before Pedro II's Coronation that took place on July 18 of that same year.

The crown is first composed of a gold ring serving as a base. Decorated with engraved motifs of tobacco branches and coffee trees in bloom and a frieze on its upper edge; it bears alternating shields bearing the coat of arms of the Brazilian Empire or medallions containing large diamonds. A decoration in the form of acanthus leaves and stylized scrolls covers the entire ring, but rises in the alignment of the shields. In the center of the acanthus leaves is encrusted a solitary diamond. Large arches rise behind these leaves and taper along their rise, until they close at the top of the whole. These arches are adorned with engraved palm leaves and bear small diamonds on the center line. At the top, an armillary sphere adorned with a diamond-encrusted cross reminiscent of the Order of Christ overlooks the whole.

This crown weighs 2.689 kilograms (5.93 lb), has a diameter of 25 centimetres (9.8 in) and is 36.5 centimetres (14.4 in) high.

== Usage ==
The crown was only used on special occasions: the coronation, official occasions, great festivities or throne speech. During the annual opening and closing sessions of the General Assembly (the Brazilian Imperial Parliament), the emperor appeared in full imperial regalia and played his role as constitutional arbiter, recalling the difficulties experienced by the country and the priority problems. This ritual, inaugurated by Pedro I in 1823, continued throughout the Empire, unlike other ceremonies.

== In heraldry ==
Before it was replaced by the crown of Pedro II, the imperial crown of Pedro I appeared on the flag and the various coats of arms of the Empire of Brazil. However, there is a particular heraldic and vexillological rule concerning the color of the crown's lining: when the crown is represented on the crest or when it crowns the shield, it must be gules. Except when it is a coat of arms or emblems of the imperial family, where it must be vert.

In Debret's original design, the shield field and the crown lining in timbre were green. Félix Taunay - like Debret, professor at the Academy of Fine Arts and its first director – did not agree with the repetition of this color. Then, suggesting its replacement by red, Dom Pedro claimed that this was the color of the Portuguese coat of arms, and that only the lining of the crown should be red. And he was adamant about the yellow-green, which, he said, represented the wealth and eternal spring of Brazil.

— Milton Luz

== See also ==
- Imperial Regalia of Brazil
- Imperial Crown of Brazil
- First reign
