= MozartNu (1986–2008) =

MozartNu (1986–2008) is a contemporary dance performance conceived by the Spanish director, Iago Pericot. It is derived from Pericot's MozartNu, which premiered in 1986. The original 1986 version of MozartNu, inspired by the Coronation Mass of Wolfgang Amadeus Mozart, showed the beauty of human relationships through the naked bodies of two dancers.

In MozartNu (1986–2008), the original version is performed by one couple on one platform, while another couple dances simultaneously on a separate platform on the same stage. These parallel performances reflect the changes that have been the result of these human relationships over time.

The premiere production of MozartNu (1986–2008) was April 15–20, 2008 at Mercat de les Flors, a theatre in Barcelona, Spain. The older dancers were the dancers who performed in the original MozartNu of 1986.
