= Monde =

Part of a crown

A monde, meaning 'world' in French, is an orb located near the top of a crown. It represents, as the name suggests, the world that the monarch rules. It is the point at which a crown's half arches meet. It is usually topped off either with a national or religious symbol, for example a cross in Christian countries.

In some cases, the crossed arches might relate this object to an armillary sphere representing the cosmic orb, as seems to happen with the crown of Pedro I of Brazil or, in a different way, with the serpent in the Rainbow Portrait of Queen Elizabeth I.

== Gallery ==
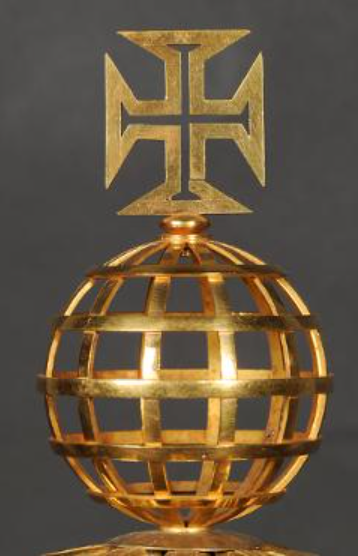
A monde and cross atop the crown of Pedro I of Brazil

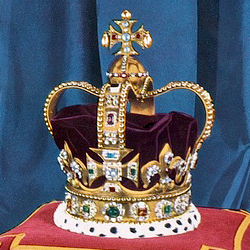
St Edward's Crown (United Kingdom)

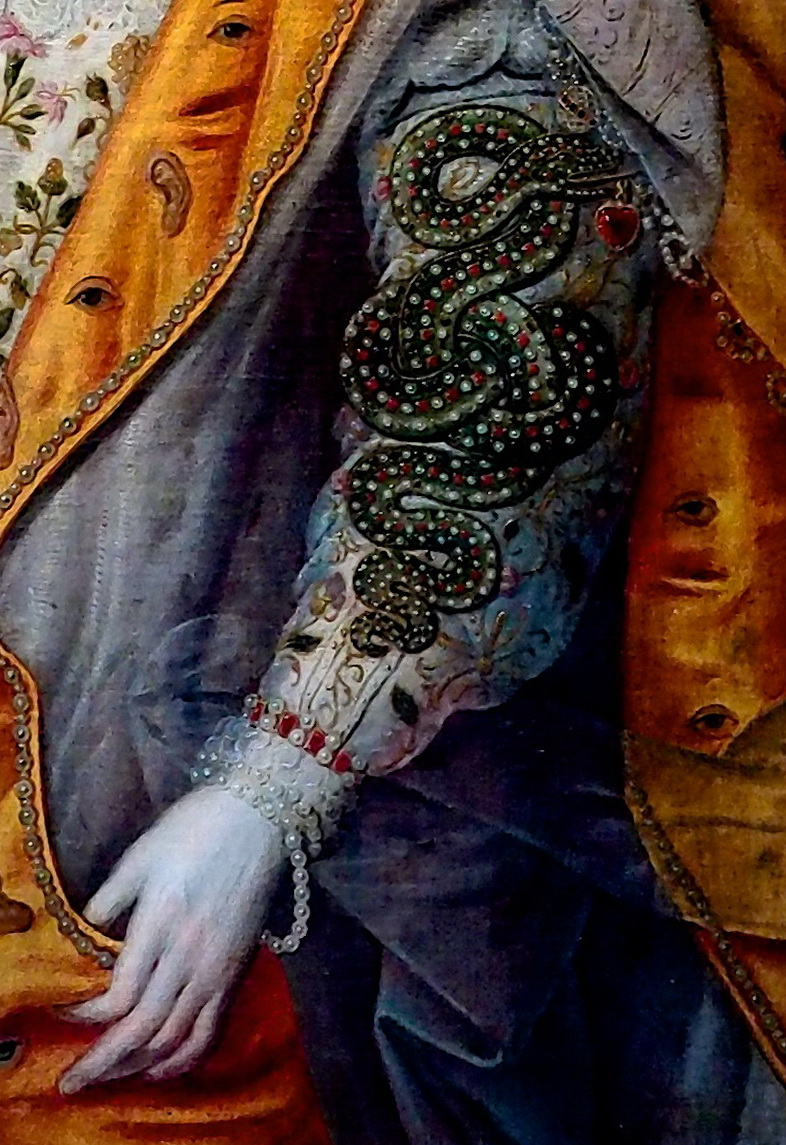
Detail from the Rainbow Portrait of Queen Elizabeth I

== See also ==
- Globus cruciger
- Armillary sphere
