= Coronation Mass (Mozart) =

Mass composed by Wolfgang Amadeus Mozart

Missa brevis in C major
- Coronation
- Mass by W. A. Mozart
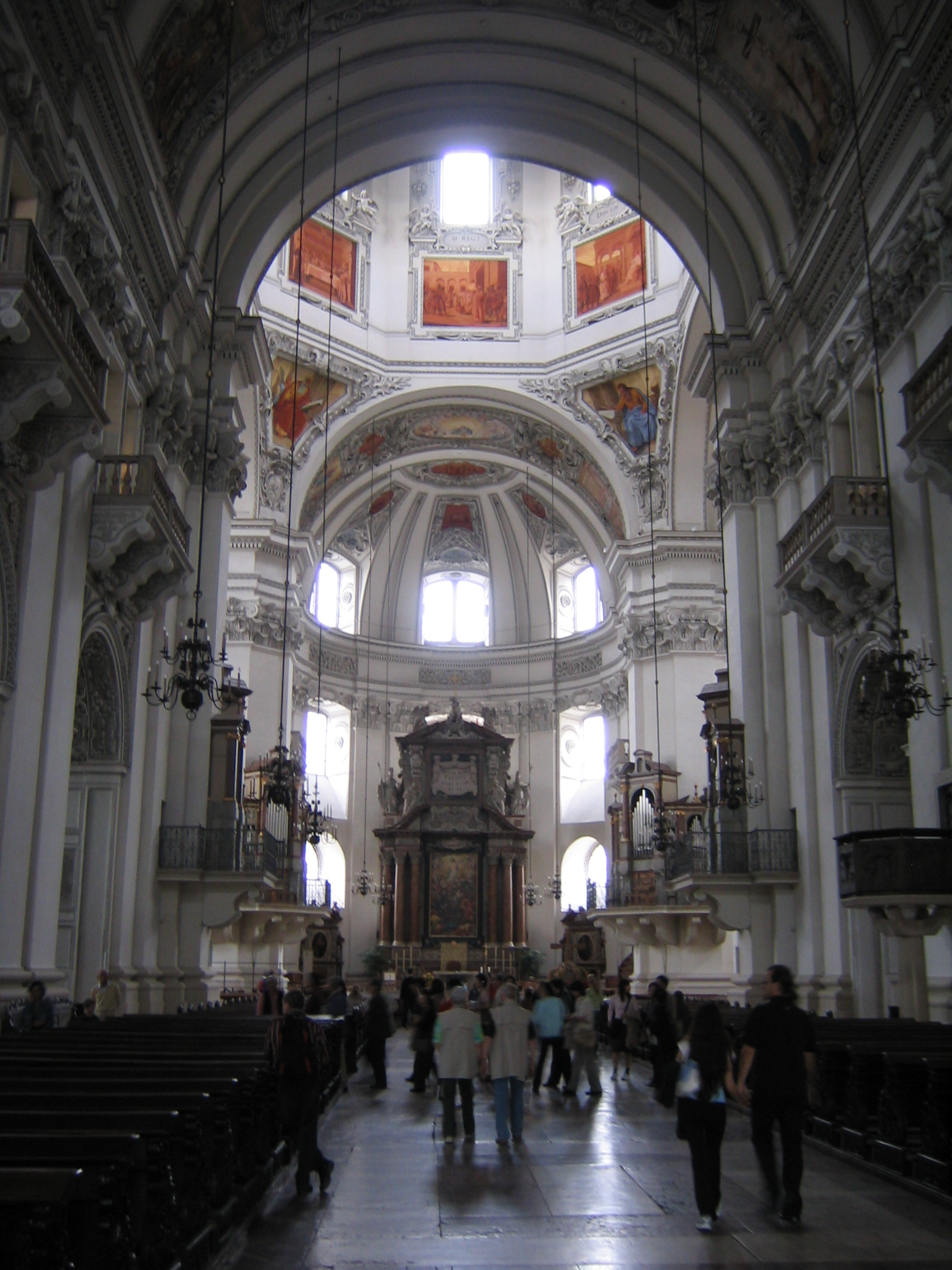
- Salzburg Cathedral, where the mass was first performed, probably on Easter Sunday.
- Other name: Krönungsmesse
- Catalogue: K. 317
- Occasion: Easter
- Composed: 1779: Salzburg
- Movements: 6
- Vocal: SATB choir and soloists
- Instrumental: orchestra; continuo

1. Kyrie

2. Gloria

3. Credo

4. Sanctus

5. Benedictus

6. Agnus Dei
1955: Igor Markevitch, director; Chor der St. Hedwigs-Kathedrale; Berliner Philharmoniker; Maria Stader, soprano; Sieglinde Wagner, contralto; Helmut Krebs, tenor; Josef Greindl, bass.

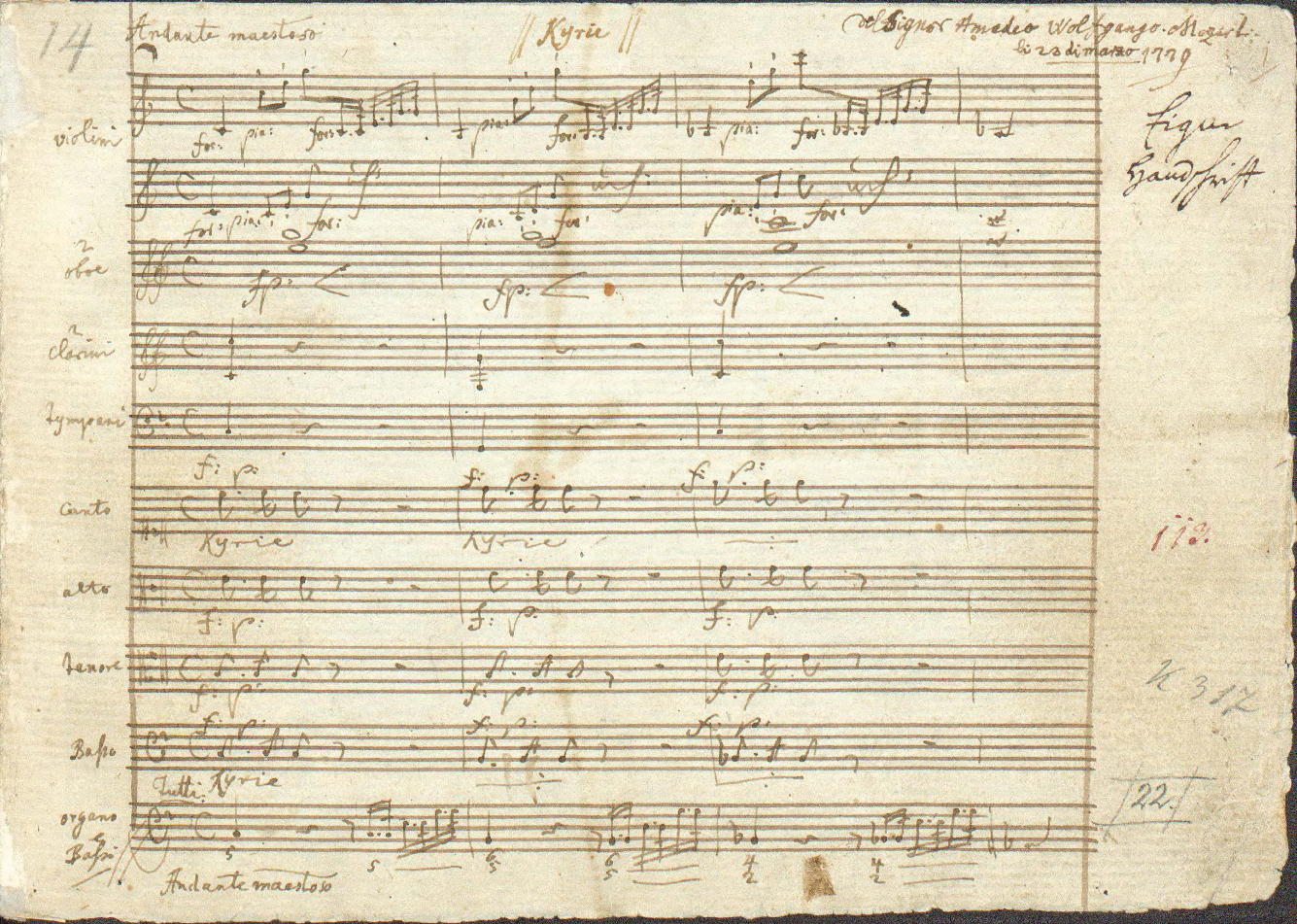
Autograph manuscript of the opening page

The Krönungsmesse (German for Coronation Mass) (Mass No. 15 in C major, K. 317; sometimes Mass No. 16), composed in 1779, is one of the most popular of Wolfgang Amadeus Mozart's 17 extant settings of the Ordinary of the Mass. While it is relatively short, Bruce C. Macintyre, writing in the Cambridge Mozart Encyclopedia, classifies it as a Missa Longa, on the basis of the festal character, size of the orchestra, which includes a substantial brass section, orchestral introductions for the movements and the setting of the intonations for the Gloria and Credo.

== History ==
The mass in C major was completed on March 23, 1779, in Salzburg. Mozart had just returned to the city after 18 months of fruitless job hunting in Paris and Mannheim, and his father Leopold promptly got him a job as court organist and composer at Salzburg Cathedral. The mass was almost certainly premiered there on Easter Sunday, 4 April 1779. The first documented performance was at the coronation of Francis II as Holy Roman Emperor in 1792.

In the early twentieth century, Johann Evangelist Engl, the archivist of the Salzburg Mozarteum, expressed the view that this mass was composed for and took its name from a remembrance celebration for the crowning of the image of the Virgin at Maria Plain outside Salzburg. This theory has been discounted.

The mass appears to have acquired the nickname Krönungsmesse (Coronation Mass) at the Imperial court in Vienna in the early nineteenth century, after becoming the preferred music for royal and imperial coronations as well as services of thanksgiving. The nickname was included in the first edition of the Köchel catalogue of Mozart's works in 1862.

Musical allusions to this mass appear in the slow movement of the Symphony No. 98 and the Harmoniemesse of Mozart's friend, Joseph Haydn.

=== 1985 Vatican performance ===
The mass was performed in a liturgical context in St. Peter's Basilica in the Vatican on 29 June 1985, with Pope John Paul II officiating and Herbert von Karajan conducting the Coro della Cappella Musicale Pontificia (the Sistine Chapel Choir), the Wiener Singverein, and the Vienna Philharmonic.

== Structure ==
1. Kyrie
2. Gloria
3. Credo
4. Sanctus
5. Benedictus
6. Agnus Dei

The Kyrie, Gloria and Credo all begin with an engaging rhythm. The soloists contrast with the larger forces of the choir, often as a quartet. Of note in this regard are the central Adagio section of the Credo at "Et incarnatus est", and the surprise of the Benedictus after the chorus has already declaimed the "Hosanna". These musical breaks mimic what is occurring in the mass at these points. Rubrics require the congregation to change from a standing position to a kneeling position at the 'incarnatus' out of respect for the Incarnation of Christ: hence the musical break. Similarly, only the first verse of the 'Sanctus' is sung before the Consecration; the 'Benedictus' verse was sung afterward, according to the rubrics of the Mass. This rubrical division often results in the verses appearing in music as two separate movements, although they are thematically joined. In the Credo, Mozart introduces the trombones for the Crucifixus and using a chromatic fourth in the bass. The soprano solo of the Agnus Dei exhibits melodic similarities to and may foreshadow "Dove sono", an aria of the Countess from Le nozze di Figaro.

== Scoring ==
The work is scored for SATB soloists and chorus, 2 violins, "Bassi", 2 oboes, 2 horns, 2 trumpets, timpani, 3 trombones (which reinforce the alto, tenor and bass choral parts) and organ. In most modern performances several players are used for some of the orchestral parts. Notable is the lack of violas, typical of music written for Salzburg, and the vague name "basses" for the stave shared by organ, bassoon (specified only in the Credo), cello and double bass. Among the original parts is one for "violone", a slippery term sometimes implying a sixteen-foot bass but also used for the eight-foot bass violin. (Note: Sixteen-foot and eight-foot indicate the pitch of an instrument (see Eight-foot pitch), and do not necessarily indicate the physical size of the instrument.)

The solo vocal parts would originally have been sung by members of the choir, and are notated on the same staves as the choral parts in Mozart's autograph score.

The horn parts appear on separate sheets at the end of the autograph score and it is unclear whether they were a later addition by Mozart, although they were composed by him before the end of 1779. The horn parts became separated from the main score, and were omitted from the 1802 edition by Breitkopf & Härtel. The horn parts are sometimes considered as optional.

== See also ==
- Coronation Mass
- MozartNu (1986–2008), a contemporary dance performance inspired by Mozart's Coronation Mass

== Sources ==
- Daniel Heartz (2009). Mozart, Haydn and Early Beethoven: 1781 — 1802 New York: W. W. Norton & Co.
- David Ian Black (2007). Mozart and the Practice of Sacred Music, 1781–91 (Ph.D. thesis, 2007). Harvard University.
