= Coronation mass =

Religious ceremony

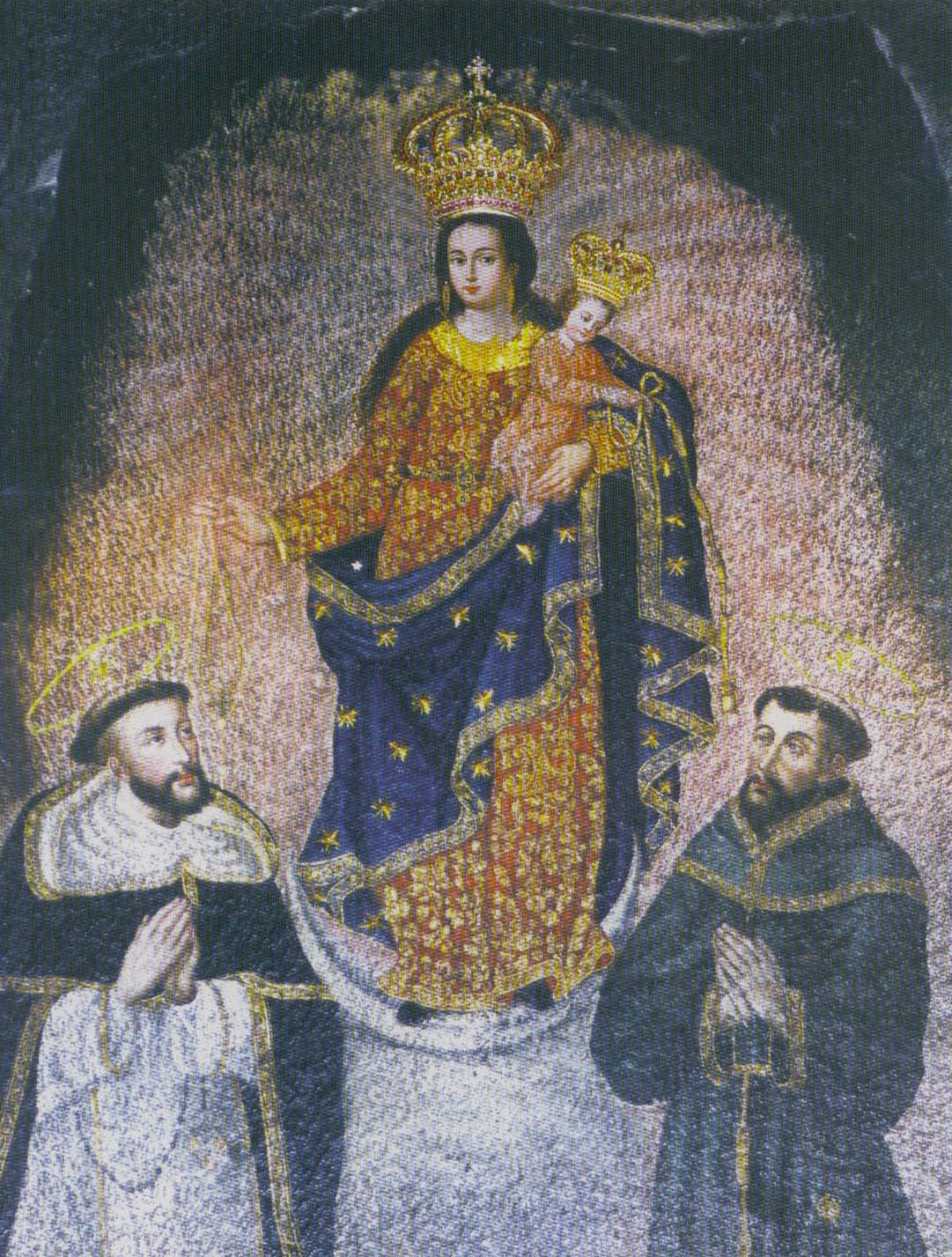
Image of Our Lady of Las Lajas (18th century)

A coronation mass is a Eucharistic celebration in which a special liturgical act, the coronation of an image of Mary, is performed.

The coronation of an image of Mary is an act of devotion to her. It expresses the belief that Mary as mother of the Son of God has queenly dignity in the new order of the kingdom of God. At the same time it is the confession of their effective presence in an image of grace. In depictions of Mary together with her divine Son, the Christ child is always, and first of all, also crowned. Such coronations, often such of images which are believed miraculous, are practised in the liturgical tradition of the Roman Catholic Church and the Eastern Churches in communion with the Roman Catholic Church, as well as in the tradition of the Eastern Orthodox Church.

== History ==
The custom of depicting the Blessed Virgin Mary adorned with a crown became common both in the East and in the West since the Council of Ephesus in 431. Christian artists often "portrayed Mary as Queen and Empress seated upon a royal throne adorned with royal insignia, crowned with the royal diadem and surrounded by the host of angels and saints in heaven, and ruling not only over nature and its powers but also over the machinations of Satan."

The custom of placing precious crowns on statues of the Virgin Mary stems from popular devotion, was practised by pious religious and laymen, and has spread increasingly since the end of the 16th century. It is related to the offering of an ex voto.

As this custom became more and more widespread, in the 17th century a separate Ritus servandus in coronatione imaginis Beatae Mariae Virginis emerged, which was incorporated into the Roman Pontifical in the 19th century.

The popes, "favoring such types of popular devotion", often crowned, either by own hand or through representatives, images of the Mother of God which were already outstanding by reason of public veneration.

In the present, the diocesan bishops decide in agreement with the local congregation whether an image should be solemnly crowned. The coronation of particularly venerated images of supra-regional importance is the responsibility of the pope. He or a cleric on his behest celebrates the coronation, usually in a Holy Mass or in a Marian vespers of the Liturgy of the Hours. The coronation can be even renewed, for example on the occasion of an anniversary.

== See also ==
- Coronation Mass (Mozart)
