= Circlet =

Type of headwear

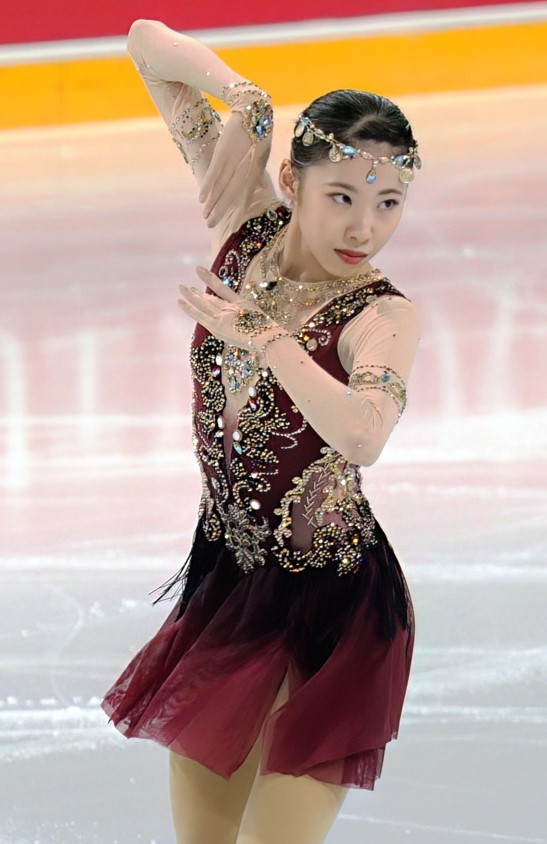
Figure skater, Rion Sumiyoshi, wearing a jeweled circlet as part of her costume.

A circlet is a piece of headwear that is similar to a diadem or a corolla. The word 'circlet' is also used to refer to the base of a crown or a coronet, with or without a cap. Diadem and circlet are often used interchangeably, and 'open crowns' with no arches (as opposed to 'closed crowns') have also been referred to as circlets. In Greek this is known as stephanos, and in Latin as corona aperta, although stephanos is associated more with laurel wreaths and the crown of thorns said to have been placed on the head of Jesus.

== Heraldic circlet ==
In heraldry, a circlet of an order of knighthood may be placed around the shield of the bearer to signify membership of a particular order. In British heraldry, this pertains to the grades of Commander and above (i.e. Knight Commander and Knight Grand Cross):

The Garter circlet

Order of the Bath

Order of St Michael and St George

Royal Victorian Order

Order of the British Empire

Order of St John

== See also ==
- Achievement (heraldry)
- Tiara
