= Imperial Regalia of Brazil =

Jewels of the former Empire of Brazil

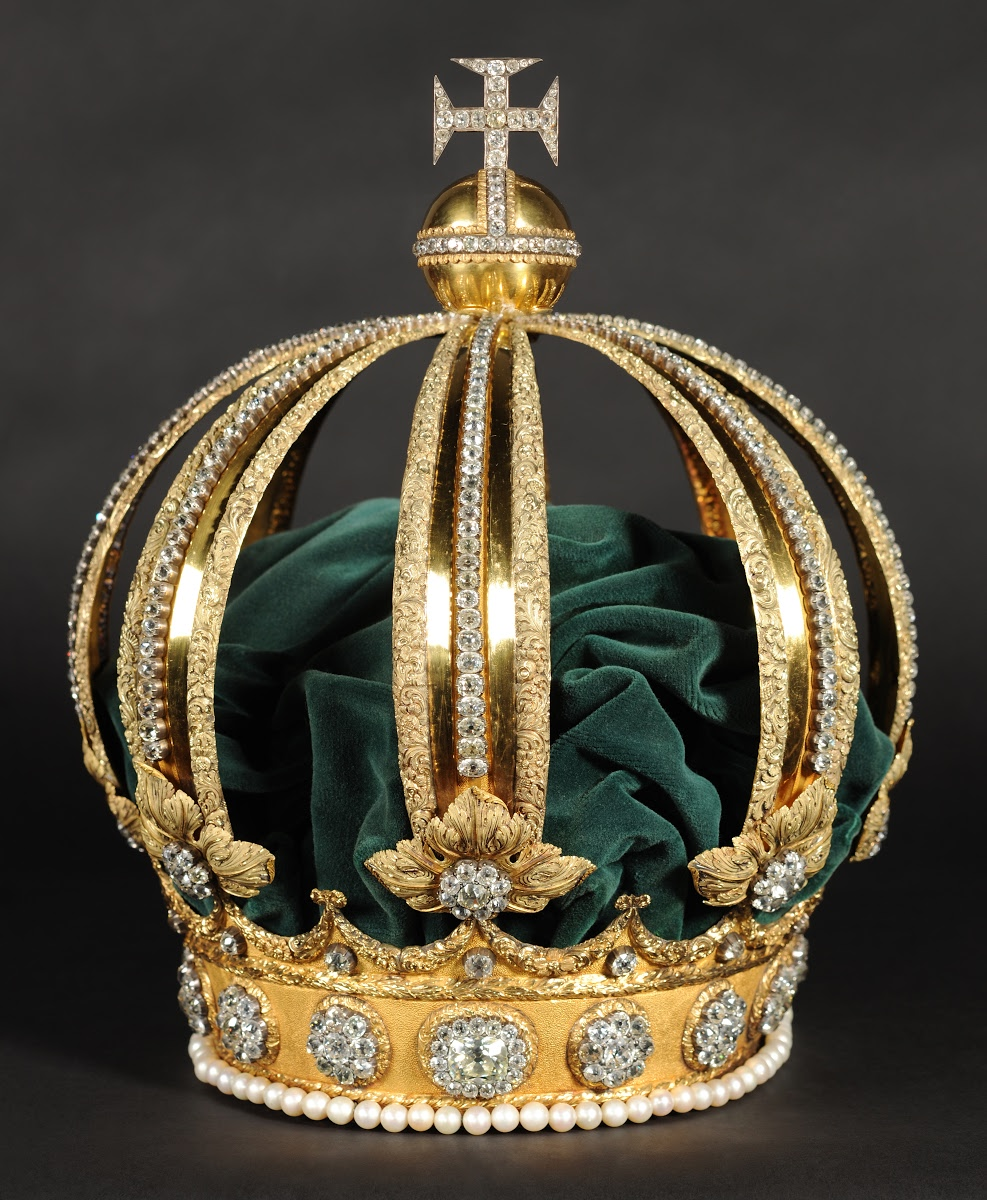
The Imperial Crown of Brazil

The Jewels of the Empire of Brazil were the official ornaments and regalia worn by the Emperor of Brazil during the Brazilian monarchical period. They were used by the Brazilian imperial family until 1889. Some of the jewels are on display at the National Museum of Brazil in Rio de Janeiro; others have been at the Imperial Museum of Brazil in Petrópolis since 1943. Some are also in Brasília.

They were used in the ceremonies of Acclamation and Coronation of the emperors of Brazil, as well as in the two solemn sessions of Opening and Closing of the General Assembly. Pieces of the regalia include the Crown of Pedro I, the Imperial Scepter, the Majestic Robes, the Sword of Ipiranga, and the Empire Medals, all kept in Brazilian territory.

== Regalia ==
=== Crown of Pedro I ===
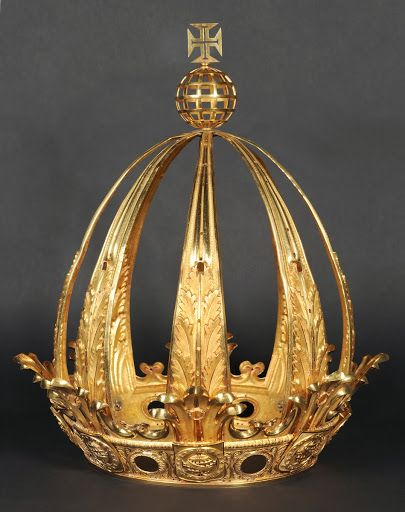
The crown of Pedro I, emptied of its jewels. The diamonds and pearls were installed in the new crown of Pedro II.

Made in 1822 for the coronation of Emperor Pedro I by the goldsmith Manuel Inácio de Loiola, the crown of Pedro I is almost an inverse of the royal crown of Portugal. The solid gold structure was adorned with 639 diamonds and decorated with multiple plant elements and engraved imperial coat of arms. Its top is decorated with an armillary sphere surmounted by a cross pattée. Emptied of its jewels at the time of the creation of the crown of Pedro II in 1841, its last use goes back to the repatriation of the remains of Pedro I in 1972.

=== Crown of Pedro II ===
Made by the goldsmith Carlos Martin in 1841, the crown of Pedro II is the symbol par excellence of Brazilian imperial power. More classical than that of his father, it is composed of a solid gold structure on which are mounted 639 diamonds (removed from the old crown) and 77 pearls, is lined with green velvet quilted with white satin and is surmounted by a cruciform orb.

=== Imperial Sceptre ===
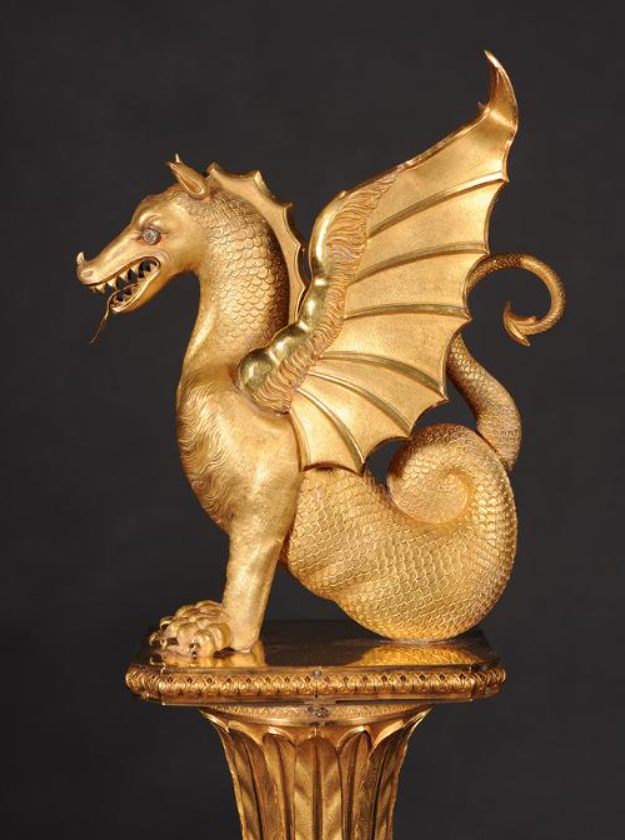
The Imperial Sceptre

Made in 1822 for the coronation of Pedro I by the Brazilian goldsmith Manuel Inácio de Loiola under the direction of Inácio Luís da Costa, the scepter was only used for important official occasions (coronations and throne speeches).

=== Imperial Costume ===
==== Mantle ====
The Brazilian imperial costume, sometimes called the "Majestic Robes" (Portuguese: Trajes Majestáticos), is the set of clothes worn by the Brazilian emperors on official occasions. More than mere accessories of beauty or elegance, each element had a strong symbolic significance for those who knew how to decode them.

==== Imperial Hat ====
White velvet hat with gold embroidery. Raised front brim, round crown with rose window formed by acorns and oak leaves interspersed within a circle formed by oak branches and leaves in the upper central part; band surrounding the junction between the crown and the brim with gold embroidery forming oak branches.

=== Abolition feather ===
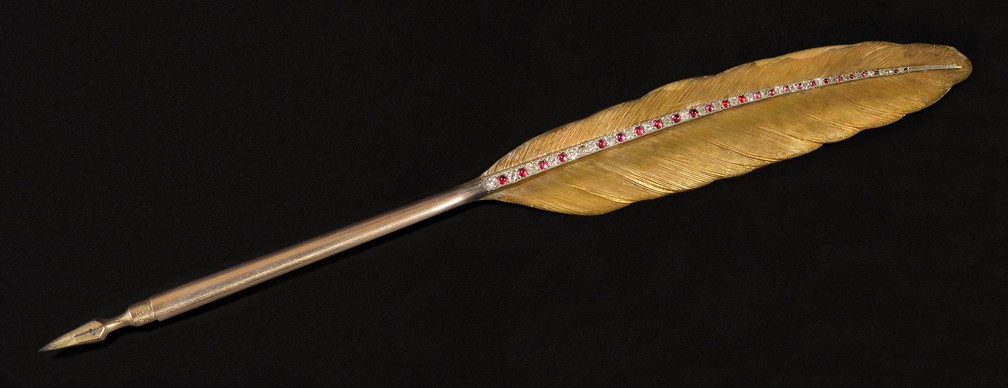
The Abolition feather

The Abolition Pen is the pen with which Isabel, Princess Imperial signed the Golden Law in 1888, ending the legality of slavery in Brazil. Financed by the population when it was known that the bill would be adopted by the General Assembly, it is made entirely of 18-carat gold and decorated with 27 diamonds and 25 rubies.

== Gallery ==
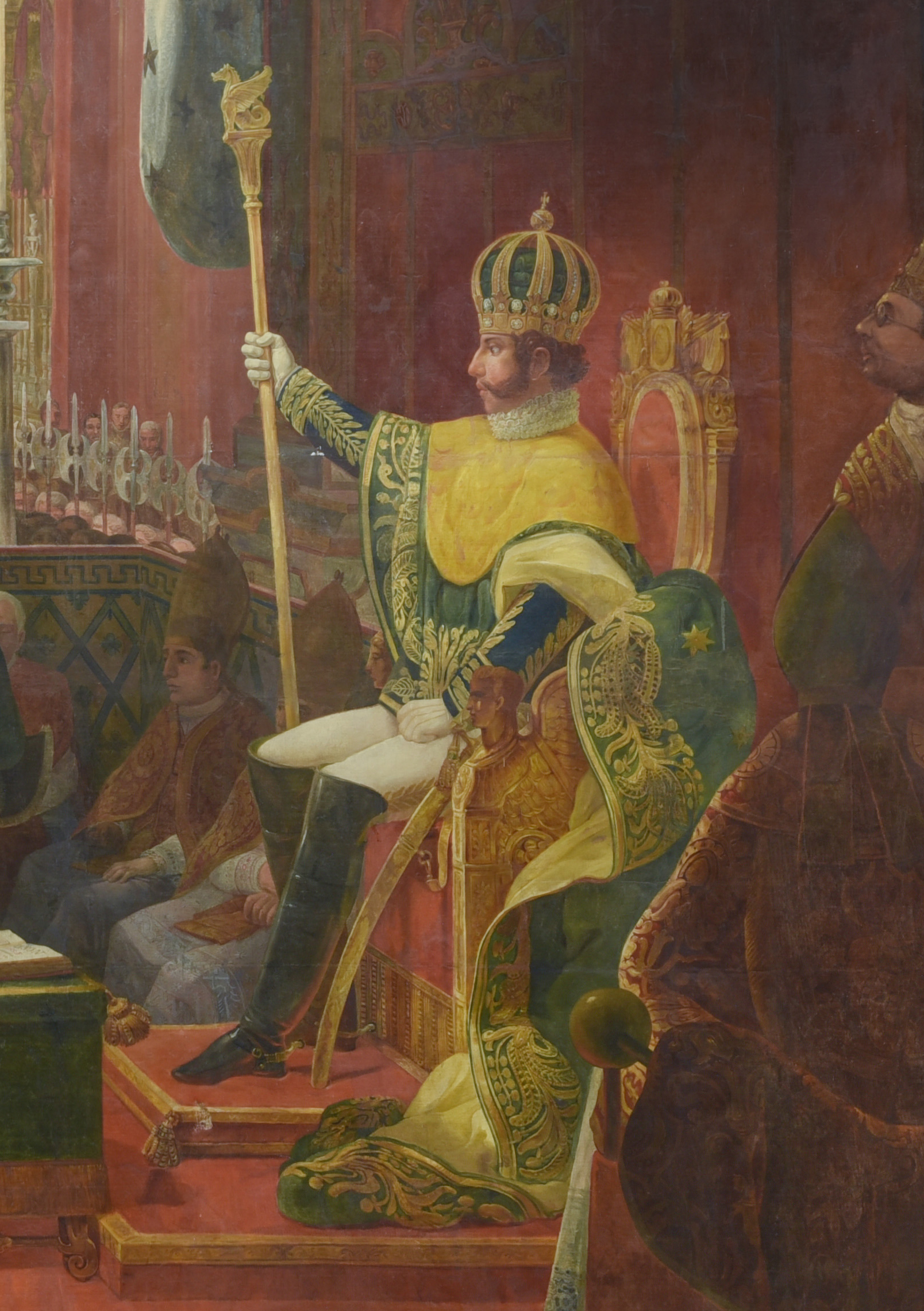
Emperor Pedro I with his crown, the Imperial Sceptre, sword, and other items of the Imperial Regalia at his coronation, 1 December 1822

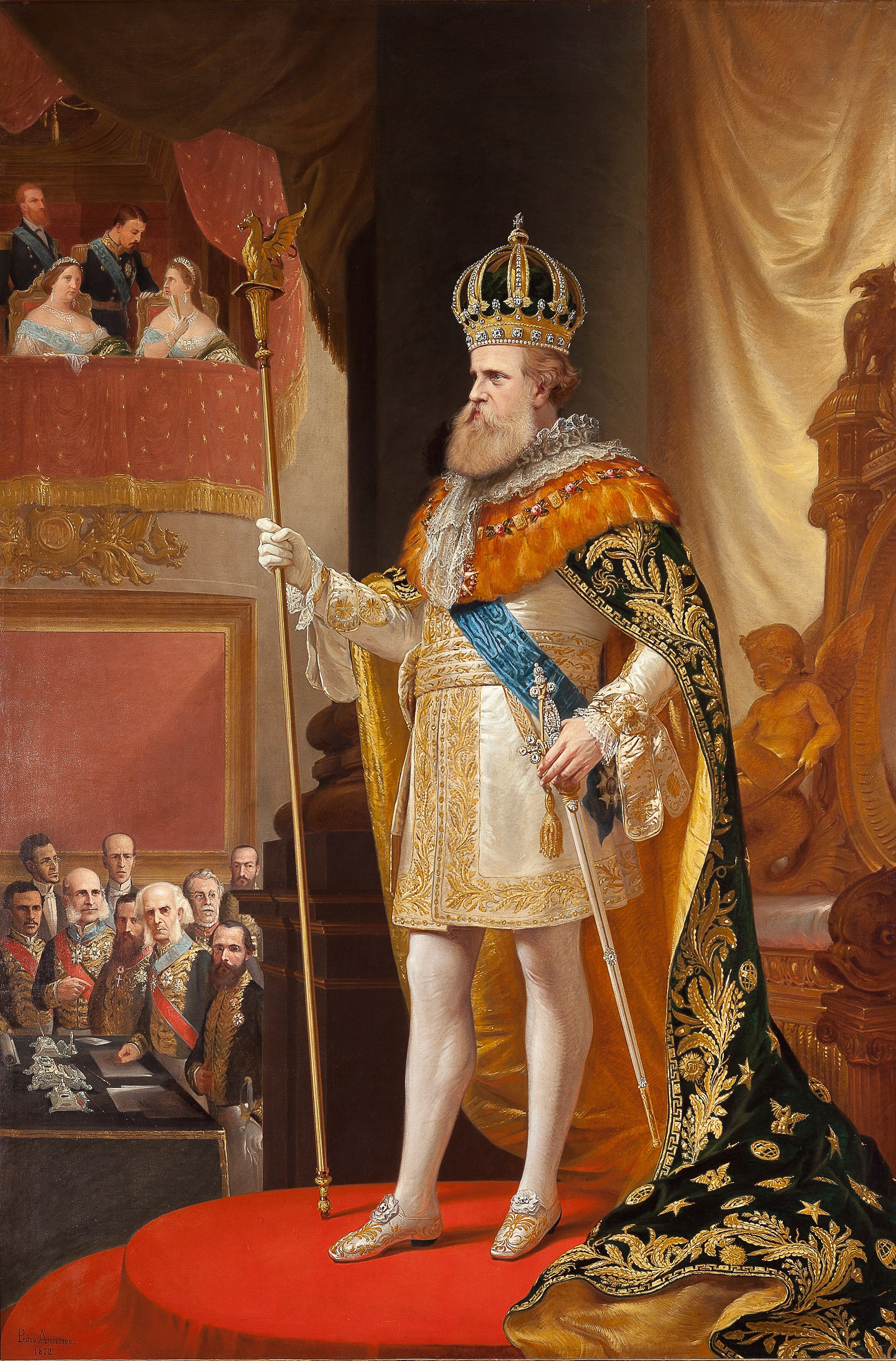
Emperor Pedro II with the Imperial Crown, Imperial Sceptre, and other elements of the Imperial Regalia during the speech from the throne ceremony, 1872

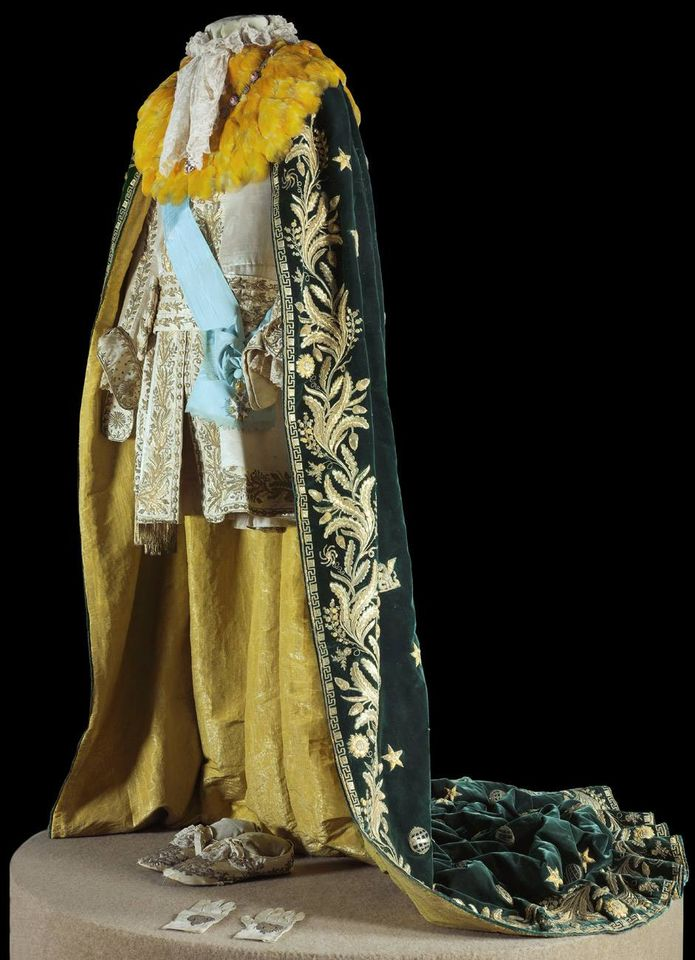
The Trajes Majestáticos ("majestic robes") of Pedro II. Its design may have been influenced by the ceremonial attire of his maternal grandfather, Francis I of Austria, particularly in its oak-leaf and acorn embroidery.
