= Cap (crown) =

Cap which fills the inner space of a modern crown

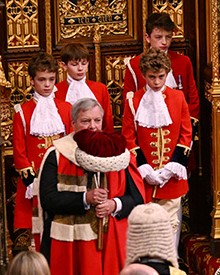
The Cap of Maintenance at the State Opening of Parliament

The cap of a crown is the cap that fills the inner space of a modern crown. While ancient crowns contained no cap, from medieval times it became traditional to fill the circlet with a cap of velvet or other such cloth, with a base of ermine.
