= Portrait of Queen Victoria =

Portrait of Queen Victoria may refer to one of a number of portrait paintings featuring Queen Victoria who reigned from 1837 to 1901 including:

- Portrait of Queen Victoria (Sully), an 1838 painting by Thomas Sully
- Coronation portrait of Queen Victoria, an 1838 painting by George Hayter
- Portrait of Queen Victoria (Wilkie), an 1840 painting by David Wilkie
- Portrait of Queen Victoria (Winterhalter), an 1843 painting by Franz Xaver Winterhalter
- Portrait of Queen Victoria (Winterhalter), a different 1843 painting by Franz Xaver Winterhalter
- Portrait of Queen Victoria (Archer Shee), an 1843 painting by Martin Archer Shee
- State portrait of Queen Victoria, an 1859 painting by Franz Xaver Winterhalter
- Portrait of Queen Victoria (Benjamin-Constant), an 1899 painting by Jean-Joseph Benjamin-Constant

== See also ==
- Victoria, Duchess of Kent with Princess Victoria, an 1821 painting by William Beechey
- Queen Victoria Enthroned in the House of Lords, an 1838 painting by George Hayter
- Queen Victoria in Fancy Dress, an 1845 painting by Edwin Landseer
- State portraits of Queen Victoria and Prince Albert, an 1859 painting by Franz Xaver Winterhalter
- Queen Victoria at Osborne, an 1866 painting by Edwin Landseer
