= Portrait of Prince Albert =

Portrait of Prince Albert may refer to:

- Portrait of Prince Albert by Franz Xaver Winterhalter (1843)
- Portrait of Prince Albert by Franz Xaver Winterhalter (1859)
