= Stuart Sapphire =

Blue sapphire which forms part of the British Crown Jewels

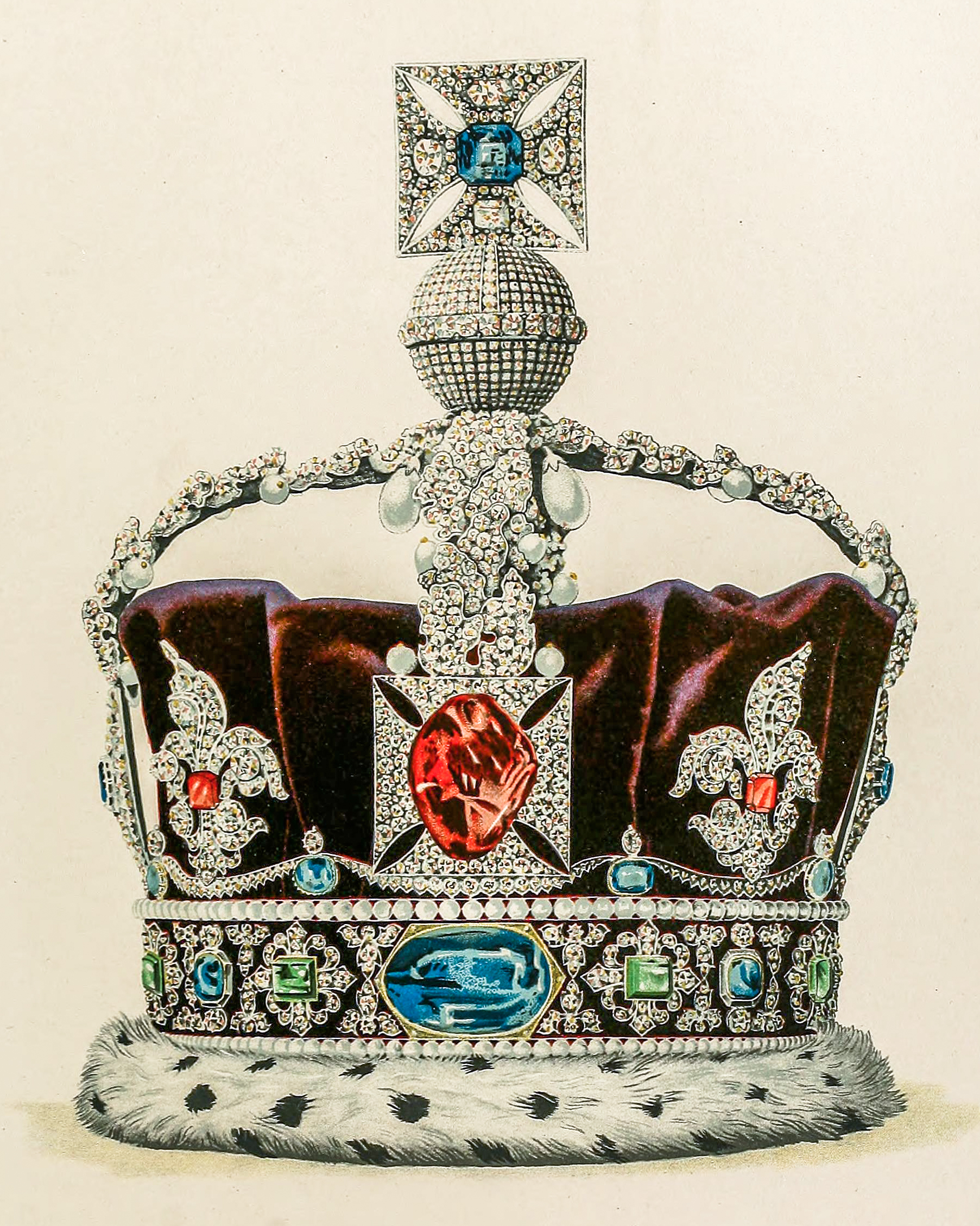
The Stuart Sapphire, set in a hexagonal gold mount, was on the front of Queen Victoria's Crown from 1838 until 1909, when it was relocated to the back.

The Stuart Sapphire is a 104-carat (21 g) blue sapphire from Sri Lanka that forms part of the British Crown Jewels.

== History ==
The early history of the gem is quite obscure, though it probably belonged to Charles II, and was definitely among the jewels that his successor James VII and II took with him when he fled to France after the Glorious Revolution in December 1688.

From there it passed to his son, James Stuart (the 'Old Pretender') who bequeathed it to his son, Henry Benedict, known later as Cardinal York, who wore it in his mitre.

As the last descendant of James VII and II, the cardinal put the sapphire, along with many other Stuart relics, up for sale in about 1799. It was acquired around 11 years later by George IV as Prince Regent and returned to the United Kingdom from Italy.

In 1820, George had the sapphire mounted on the clasp of a new armlet containing 335 diamonds, which was a gift for his mistress, Elizabeth, Lady Conyngham, who wore it at the king's coronation the following year. Upon George's death in 1830, Lady Conyngham offered the armlet to his successor, William IV, but the king allowed her to keep it because it was not considered Crown property.

After Queen Victoria ascended the throne in 1837 the sapphire took pride of place at the front of her new crown, just below the Black Prince's Ruby. It is thought Lady Conyngham presented it to Victoria on the advice of her son, Francis Conyngham, the Lord Chamberlain.

In 1909, during the reign of Edward VII, it was moved to the back of the crown to make way for the 317-carat (63.4 g) Cullinan II diamond. It still occupies that position in the back of the Imperial State Crown made in 1937 (a copy of Victoria's) and used by Charles III.

The crown is on public display with the other Crown Jewels in the Jewel House at the Tower of London.

== Description ==
The ovoid table-cut sapphire weighs 104 carats (21 g). It is 4.9 cm (1 7/8 in) long, and has one or two blemishes but was evidently deemed to be of high value by the Stuarts. At some point a hole was drilled at one end, probably to introduce an attachment by which the stone could be worn as a pendant. On the back is a miniature plaque engraved with a short history of the Imperial State Crown.

== See also ==
- St Edward's Sapphire
- List of individual gemstones
- List of sapphires by size
