= Coronation portrait of Queen Victoria =

Painting by George Hayter

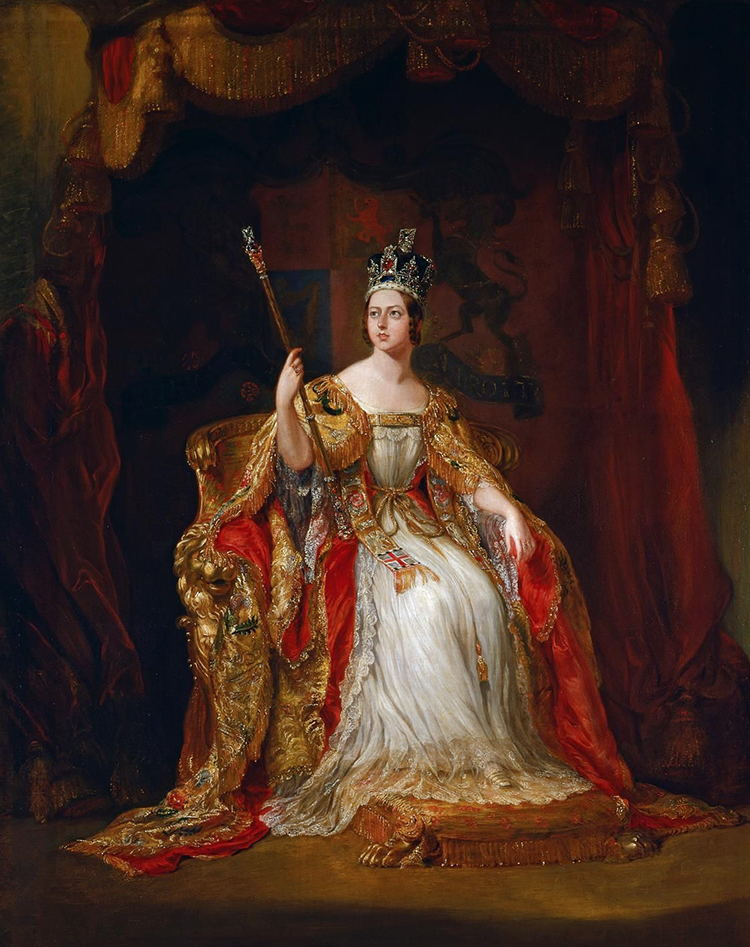
- Artist: George Hayter
- Year: 1838
- Medium: Oil on canvas
- Dimensions: 128.3 cm × 102.9 cm (50.5 in × 40.5 in)
- Location: Royal Dining Room, Holyrood Palace; Edinburgh

Coronation portrait of the British monarch Queen Victoria is a portrait painting from 1838 by the English artist George Hayter depicting the Queen in her coronation robes. Her coronation had taken place on 28 June 1838 at Westminster Abbey. The new queen had inherited the crown from her uncle King William IV in 1837 at the age of 18.

Coronation portraits are usually large full-length paintings, which show the monarch in coronation robes surrounded by a crown, orb and sceptre. Hayter had been commissioned to record a scene from the coronation, which was eventually unveiled as The Coronation of Queen Victoria in 1839, in addition to painting a coronation state portrait of the Queen. He was appointed as Victoria's Painter of History and Portrait in 1837 and later became Principal Painter in Ordinary, despite the notional seniority of the Irish artist Sir Martin Archer Shee, the President of the Royal Academy.

In the coronation state portrait, Victoria is depicted sitting in her homage chair and in her coronation robes, while wearing the Imperial State Crown and holding the Sceptre with the Cross. She was initially depicted in Westminster Abbey as the painting's background, but Hayter would subsequently change this to a more generic royal scene. Several copies of the painting are in the Royal Collection and the principal version is located at Holyrood Palace, Edinburgh. Other replicas are at Buckingham Palace, the National Portrait Gallery, and the Government Art Collection.

== See also ==
- State portraits of Queen Victoria and Prince Albert
