= State portraits of Queen Victoria and Prince Albert =

Paintings by Franz Xaver Winterhalter

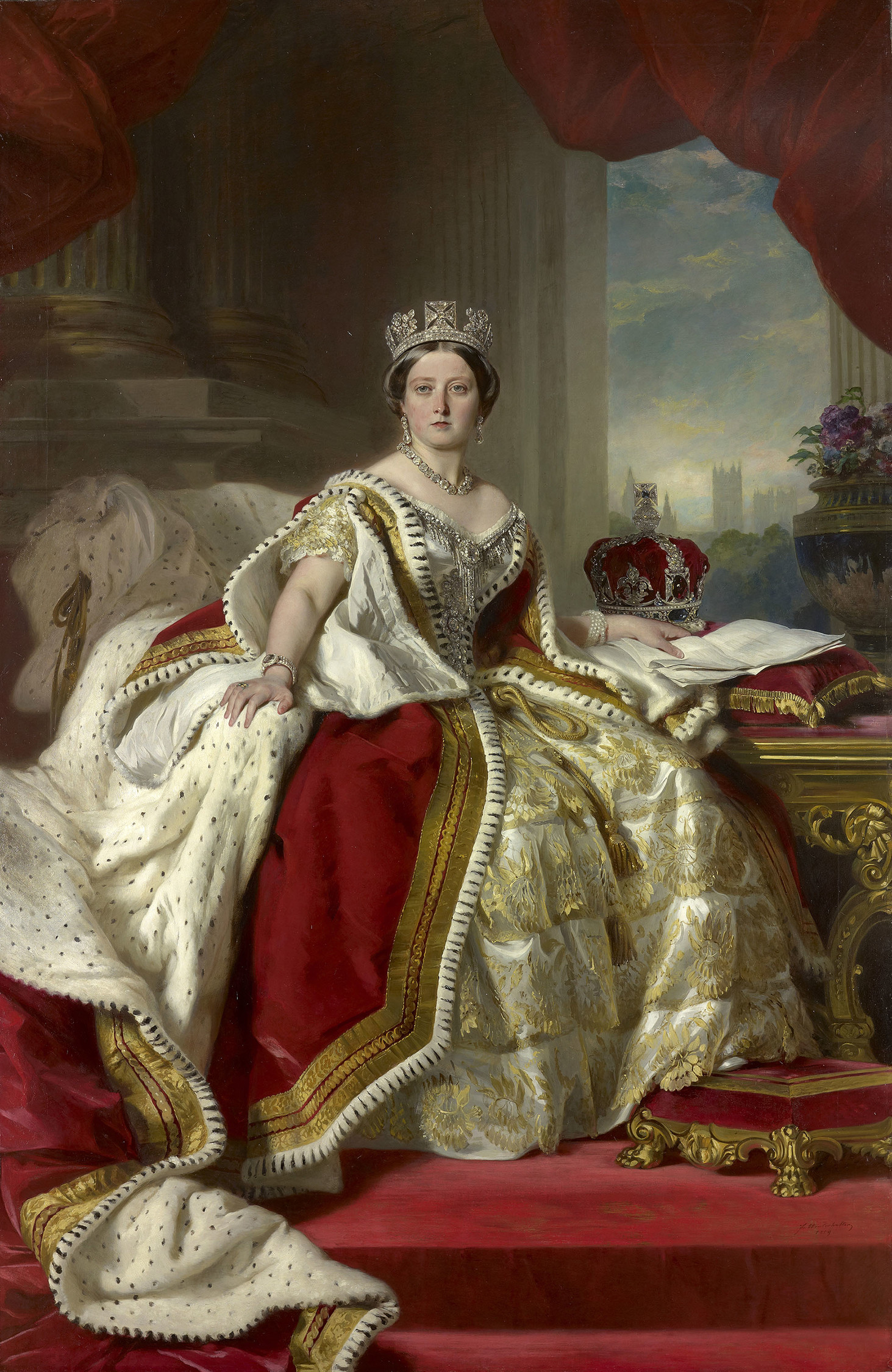
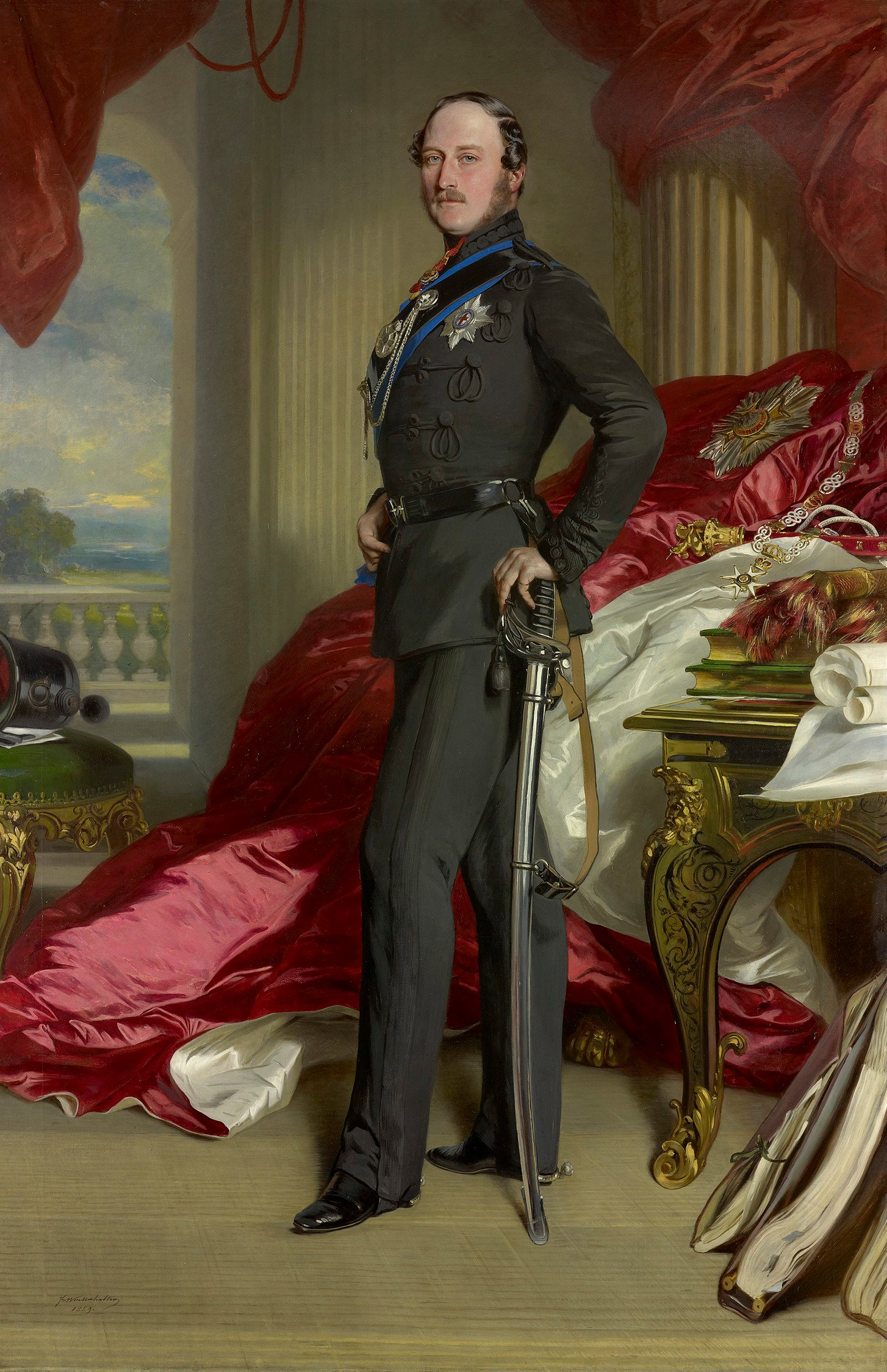
- Artist: Franz Xaver Winterhalter
- Year: 1859
- Type: Oil on canvas, portrait painting
- Dimensions: 241.9 cm (95.2 in)
- Location: Grand Entrance and Marble Hall, Buckingham Palace, London

The state portraits of Queen Victoria and Prince Albert are 1859 portrait paintings by the German artist Franz Xaver Winterhalter. Albert's portrait was the last of several ones Winterhalter painted of Albert before the prince's death in 1861.

Winterhalter had been commissioned by the Queen following her marriage to Albert and after her dissatisfaction with works by painters such as David Wilkie. The new state portraits were commissioned in 1858 and upon their unveiling in 1859 Victoria described them as "truly magnificent". Victoria is shown in her robes of state wearing the George IV State Diadem, and the earrings and necklace made by Garrard's in 1858. Her left hand is placed on some papers next to the Imperial State Crown. Westminster can be seen in the painting's background. Albert is shown in the uniform of the Rifle Brigade and wearing the star and ribbon of the Order of the Garter and the badge of the Golden Fleece. Behind him are the robes of the Order of the Bath, while adjacent to the table are the chain and star of the Order as well as a field marshal's baton. His shako is placed on a stool in the background.

The original paintings remain in the Royal Collection and on display at the Grand Entrance and Marble Hall at Buckingham Palace. In 1867 Winterhalter produced a copy of Albert's portrait at the command of Victoria. She had been approached with a request from the recently established National Portrait Gallery who lacked a painting of the Prince, and she gifted it to the gallery.

== See also ==
- Coronation portrait of Queen Victoria
- Queen Victoria and Prince Albert in Garter Robes

== Bibliography ==
- Phillips, Charles. The Complete Illustrated Encyclopedia of the Kings & Queens of Britain. Hermes House, 2006. ISBN 0754816281.
- Weintraub, Stanley. Uncrowned King: The Life of Prince Albert. Simon and Schuster, 2000. ISBN 0743206096.
