= Black Prince's Ruby =

Large uncut gemstone set in the UK's Imperial State Crown

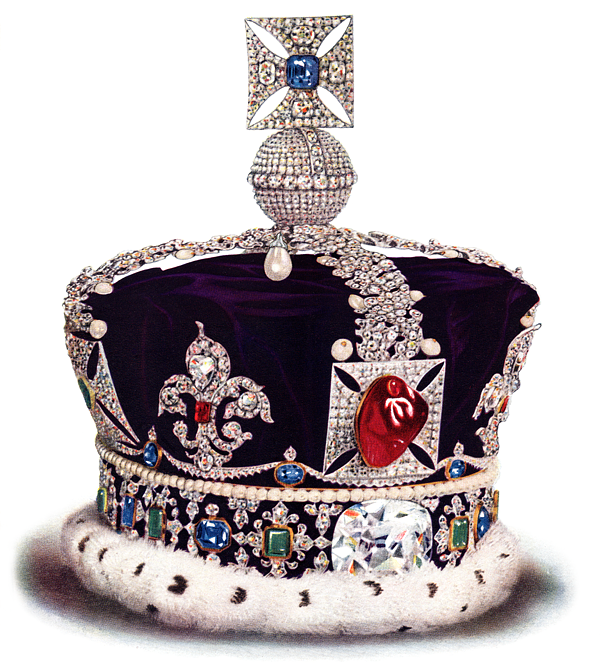
The gemstone at the front of the Imperial State Crown

The Black Prince's Ruby is a large, irregular cabochon red spinel weighing 170 carats (34 g) set in the cross pattée above the Cullinan II diamond at the front of the Imperial State Crown of the United Kingdom.

The spinel is one of the oldest gems in the Crown Jewels of the United Kingdom, with a history dating back to the mid-14th century. According to a legend originating from the 1760s, the stone has been in the possession of the English and later British monarchy since it was given in 1367 by the Spanish king Peter of Castile to the Prince of Wales, Edward of Woodstock, known as the "Black Prince". Henry V is said to have worn it at the Battle of Agincourt in 1415. The stone is believed to have been mined in Badakhshan in present-day Afghanistan, the principal source of large spinel gems in the Middle Ages.

== Spinel ==
The Black Prince's Ruby weighs 170 carats (34 g) and is approximately 4.3 centimetres (1 3/4 in) long. All red gemstones used to be referred to as rubies or "balas rubies". It was not until 1783 that spinels were chemically differentiated from rubies. Both contain aluminium and oxygen, and both derive their colour from chromium(III), but the spinel also contains magnesium, which rubies lack.

== History ==
=== Don Pedro of Seville ===
According to tradition, the history of the Black Prince's Ruby dates back to the middle of the 14th century as the possession of Abū Sa'īd, the Arab Muslim Prince of the Kingdom of Granada. At that time, the rule of Castile was being centralized to Seville and the Moorish Kingdom of Granada was being systematically attacked and reverted to Castilian rule as a part of the Christian Reconquest of the Iberian Peninsula. Abū Sa'īd in particular was confronted by the belligerency of nascent Castile under the rule of Peter of Castile, also known to history as either Don Pedro the Cruel, or Don Pedro the Just. According to historical accounts, Abū Sa'īd wished to surrender to Don Pedro, but the conditions he offered were unclear. What is clear is that Don Pedro welcomed his coming to Seville. It is recorded that he greatly desired Abū Sa'īd's wealth. When Abū Sa'īd met with Don Pedro, the King had Abū Sa'īd's servants killed and may have personally stabbed Sa'īd to death himself. When Sa'īd's corpse was searched, the spinel was found and added to Don Pedro's possessions.

In 1366, Don Pedro's illegitimate brother, Henry of Trastámara, led a revolt against Don Pedro. Lacking the power to put down the revolt unaided, Don Pedro made an alliance with the Black Prince, the son of Edward III of England. The Black Prince took part in the Battle of Nájera, and apparently demanded the ruby in exchange for the services he had rendered. He had problems obtaining cash from Pedro, but returned to England with gemstones and Pedro's two daughters, Dona Constanza of Castile and Dona Isabel of Castile. Marriages were contracted for them to the Prince's brothers. It is assumed that the Black Prince took the Ruby back to England at that time, although it disappears from historical records until 1415, when it was worn by Henry V of England.

=== A wartime adornment ===
During his campaign in France, Henry V of England wore a gem-encrusted helmet that included the Black Prince's Ruby. In the Battle of Agincourt on 25 October 1415, the French Duke of Alençon struck Henry on the head with a battleaxe, and Henry nearly lost both the helmet and his life. The battle was won by Henry's forces and the Black Prince's Ruby was saved. Richard III is supposed to have worn the gemstone in his helmet at the Battle of Bosworth in 1485, in which he was killed.

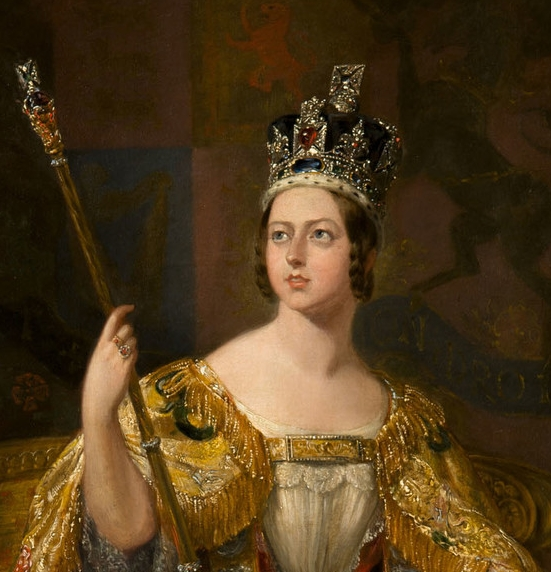
Detail of Queen Victoria's Coronation Portrait, showing the Black Prince's Ruby on the crown

=== Crown Jewels ===
Henry VIII's inventory of 1521 mentions "a great balas ruby" set in the Tudor Crown, thought to be the Black Prince's Ruby. It remained there until the monarchy was temporarily abolished in the 17th century. The Commonwealth had the royal crowns disassembled and gems sold, and the gold was melted down and struck into coins. How the stone found its way back into the Royal Collection after the Interregnum is unclear, but a substantial "ruby" was acquired for the Crown Jewels in 1661 at a cost of £400, and this may well have been the spinel. At the coronation of Queen Victoria in 1838, she was crowned with a new Imperial State Crown made for her by Rundell and Bridge, with 3,093 gems, including the spinel at the front. The Queen can be clearly seen wearing the jewel in the Imperial State Crown in her official coronation portrait by Sir George Hayter. This was remade in 1937 into the current, lighter, crown. A plaquette on the reverse of the gemstone commemorates the crown's history.

== See also ==
- List of individual gemstones

== Bibliography ==
- Bird, Rufus; Clayton, Martin, eds. (2017). Charles II: Art and Power. Royal Collection Trust. ISBN 978-1-909741-44-7.
- Mears, Kenneth J.; Thurley, Simon; Murphy, Claire (1994). The Crown Jewels. Historic Royal Palaces. ASIN B000HHY1ZQ.
- Ogden, Jack (2020). "The Black Prince's Ruby: Investigating the Legend". The Journal of Gemmology. 37 (4): 360–373. Bibcode:2020JGem...37..360O. doi:10.15506/JoG.2020.37.4.360.
