= St Edward's Sapphire =

Part of the British Crown Jewels

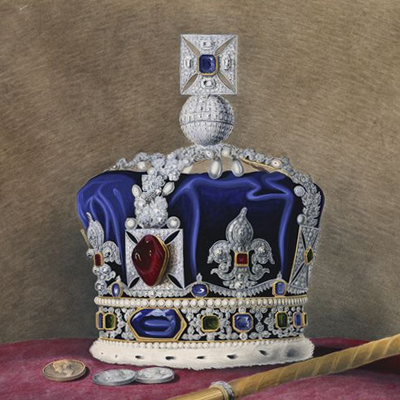
St Edward's Sapphire set in the top cross of Queen Victoria's Crown, c. 1838–1848

St Edward's Sapphire is an octagonal rose-cut blue sapphire that forms part of the British Crown Jewels.

== History ==
Its history is older than any other gemstone in the Royal Collection. The sapphire is thought to have been set in the coronation ring of King Edward, known later as St Edward the Confessor, who ascended the English throne in 1042, twenty-four years before the Norman conquest.

Edward, one of the last Anglo-Saxon kings of England, was buried with the ring at Westminster Abbey in 1066.

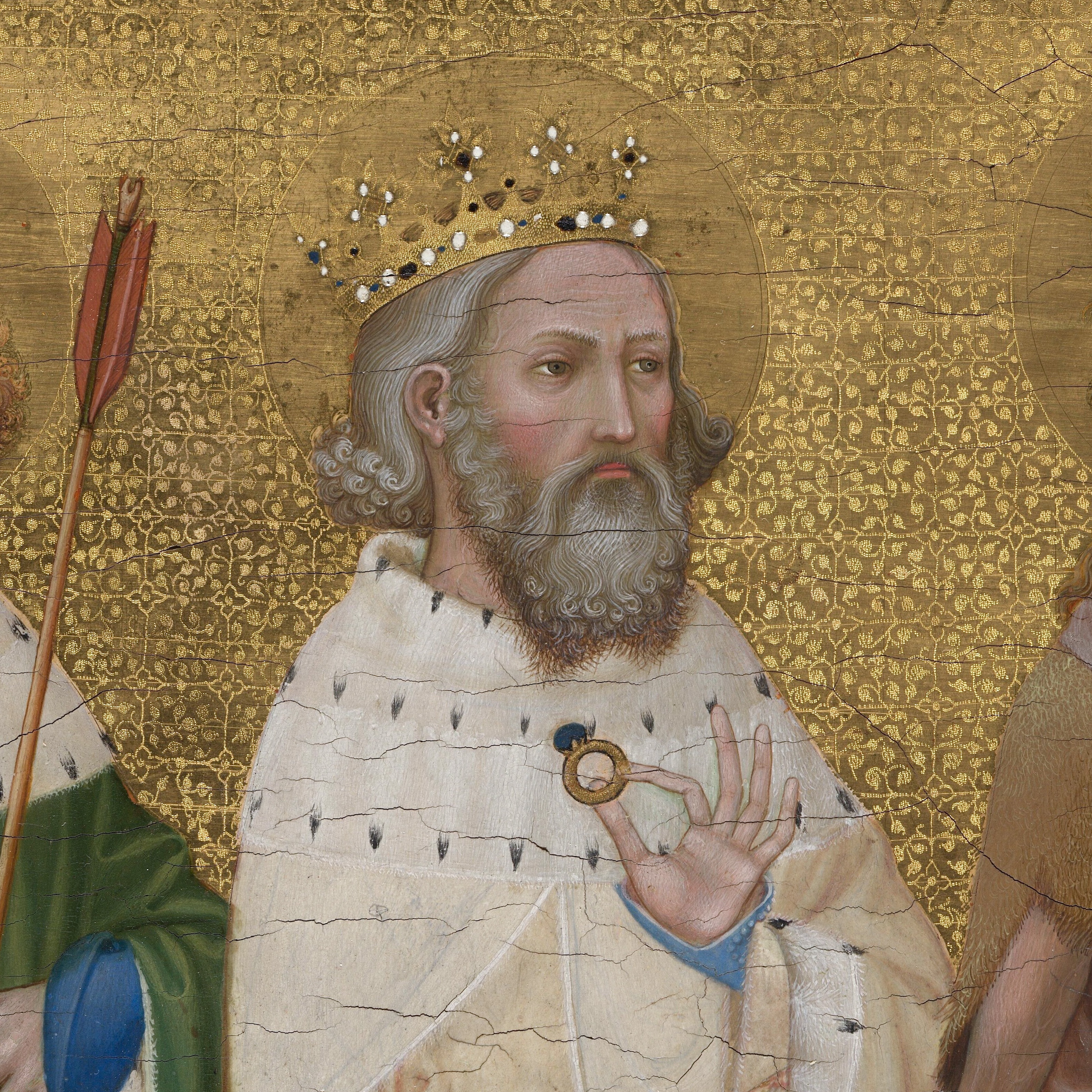
Edward the Confessor holding his sapphire coronation ring in The Wilton Diptych, c. 1395–1399

It was reputedly taken from the ring when Edward's body was re-interred at Westminster Abbey in 1163.

According to an inventory of royal regalia drawn up in 1649, St Edward's Crown, the traditional coronation crown of English monarchs, contained, among other precious stones, a sapphire valued at £60, which may well have been St Edward's Sapphire.

How it survived the abolition of the monarchy during the English Civil War in the 17th century is not clear, but it was most likely re-cut into its present form for Charles II after the restoration of the monarchy.

In 1838, Queen Victoria added the jewel to her new crown, giving it a leading role in the centre of the cross pattée above the monde surmounting the crown, where it remains today in the 1937 version worn by King Charles III.

The Imperial State Crown is on public display with the other Crown Jewels in the Jewel House at the Tower of London.

== See also ==
- Stuart Sapphire
- List of individual gemstones
