= Queen Victoria and Prince Albert in Garter Robes =

Paintings by Franz Xaver Winterhalter

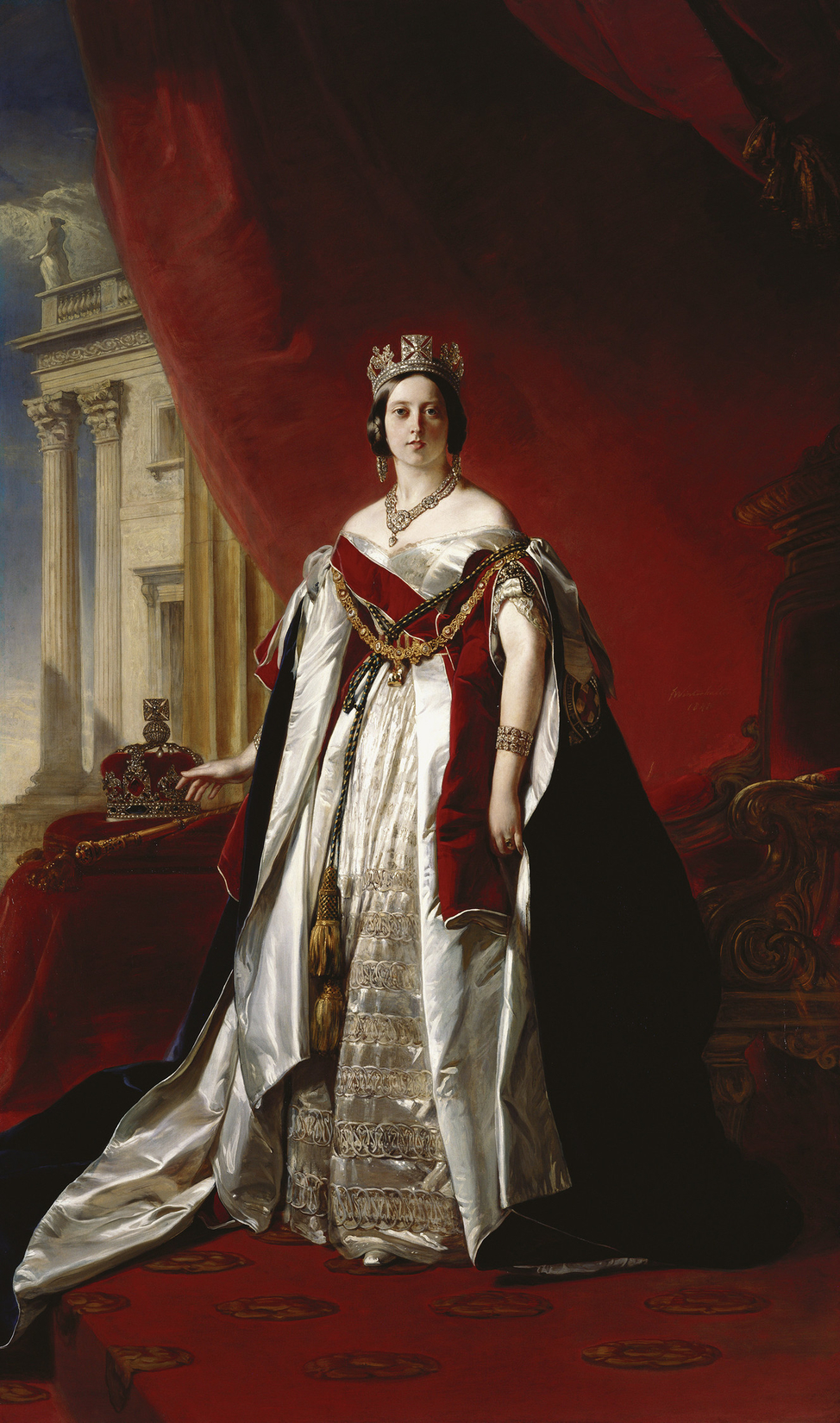
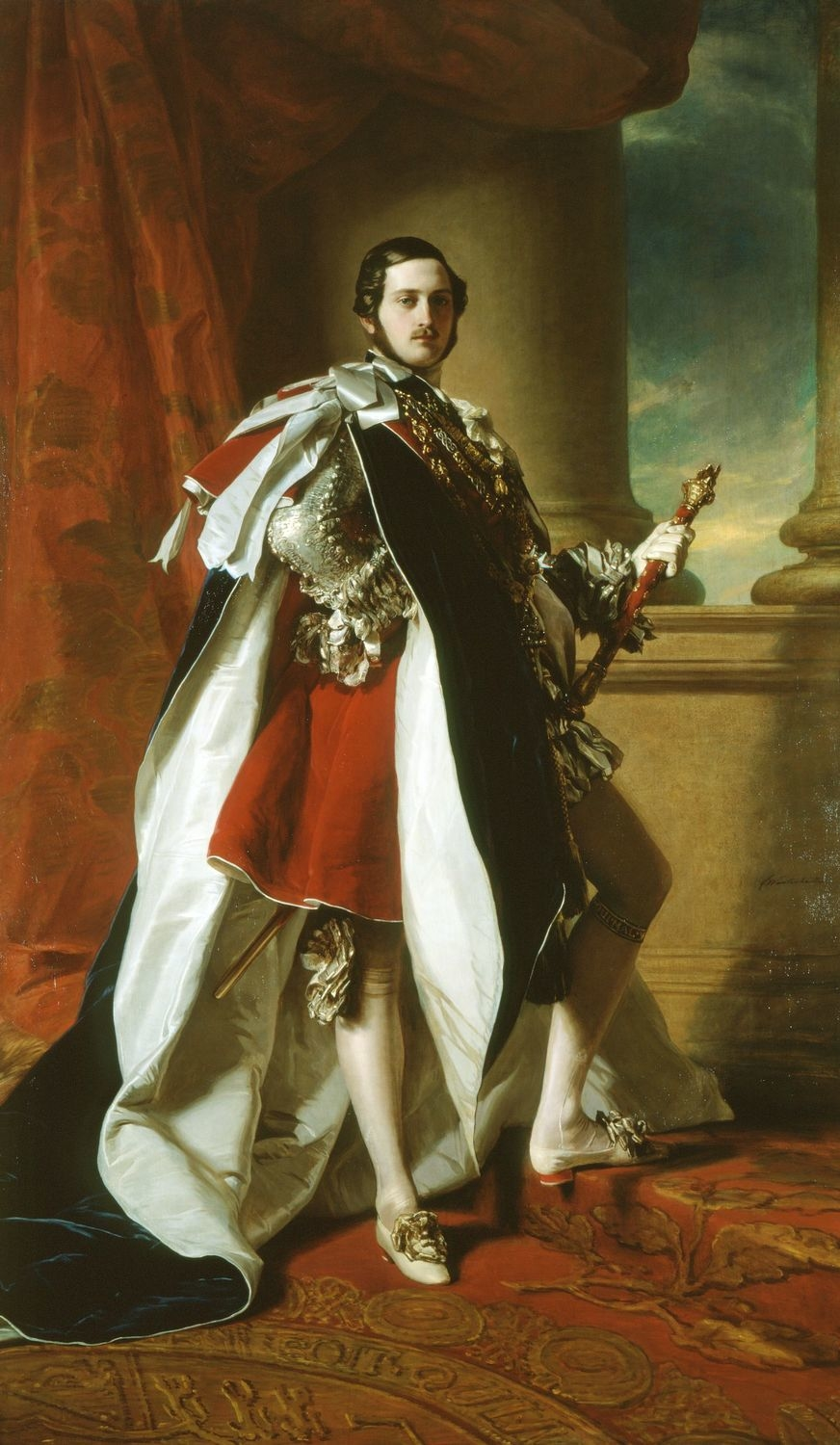
- Artist: Franz Xaver Winterhalter
- Year: 1843
- Type: Oil on canvas, portrait painting
- Location: Garter Throne Room, Windsor Castle

The portraits of Queen Victoria and Prince Albert in Garter Robes are 1843 portrait paintings by the German artist Franz Xaver Winterhalter.

Winterhalter had been commissioned by the Queen following her marriage to Albert and after her dissatisfaction with works by painters such as David Wilkie. Winterhalter's portraits of Queen Louise of Belgium caught Victoria's attention, who commissioned him for various portraits from 1842 onwards. With the Garter wrapped over her left arm, the Queen is depicted donning the Garter mantle. She also wears the George IV State Diadem, the necklace and earrings constructed in 1839 from Turkish diamonds that Sultan Mahmud II had given her in 1838. To her right are the Imperial State Crown and her Sceptre placed on a cushion. The background shows the south-east corner of Buckingham Palace, which is often visible from the Green Drawing Room. Albert is shown dressed in the Order of the Garter's robes and the Bath, Golden Fleece, and Garter collars. He is holding in his left hand a field marshal's baton.

The original paintings remain in the Royal Collection and on display at the Garter Throne Room at Windsor Castle. Upon the portraits's unveiling, the Queen described them as "really splendid, both as to painting and likeness". Several copies were subsequently produced and sent to British embassies and overseas territories.

== See also ==
- State portraits of Queen Victoria and Prince Albert
