= Imperial State Crown =

One of the Crown Jewels of the United Kingdom

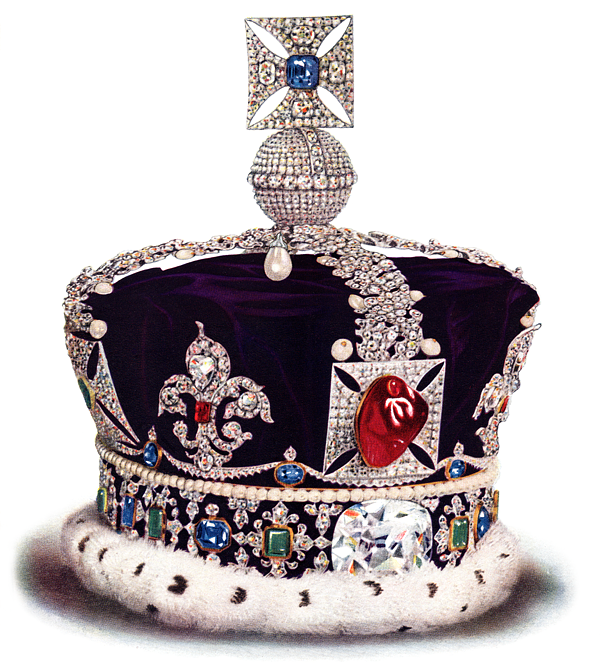
- Hand-coloured photograph, published in 1919, digitally altered to resemble the crown's current shorter appearance

Details
- Country: United Kingdom
- Made: 1937
- Owner: King Charles III in right of the Crown
- Weight: 1.06 kg (2.3 lb)
- Arches: 2 (four half-arches)
- Material: Gold, silver, platinum
- Cap: Velvet trimmed with ermine
- Notable stones: Cullinan II, St Edward's Sapphire, Black Prince's Ruby, Stuart Sapphire
- Predecessors: Coronation Crown of George IV

The Imperial State Crown is the state crown of the British monarch. Based on the design of Queen Victoria's Crown of 1838, which had fallen into disrepair, it was made in 1937 for the coronation of King George VI. The crown remains in use today at coronations and State Openings of Parliament. It is adorned with 3,170 precious stones, including the 317-carat (63 g) Cullinan II diamond, St Edward's Sapphire, the Stuart Sapphire, and the Black Prince's Ruby (a large red spinel).

== Origins ==
St Edward's Crown, used to crown English monarchs, was considered to be a holy relic, kept in the saint's shrine at Westminster Abbey and therefore not worn by monarchs at any other time. Instead, a "great crown" with crosses and fleurs-de-lis, but without arches (an open crown), was a king's usual headgear at state occasions until the time of Henry V, who is depicted wearing an imperial crown of state with gold arches (a closed crown). Arches were a symbol of sovereignty, and by this point in history, the king of England was being celebrated as rex in regno suo est imperator – an emperor of his own domain – subservient to no one but God, unlike some continental rulers, who owed fealty to more powerful kings or to the Holy Roman Emperor.

Henry VII or his son and successor Henry VIII commissioned an elaborate crown, now known as the Tudor Crown, which is first described in detail in an inventory of royal jewels in 1521. Henry VIII wore the crown during court ceremonies, in particular at Christmas when he would process to chapel in his coronation regalia. Both Edward VI and Mary I were crowned with three crowns in succession: first St Edward's Crown, second the Tudor Crown (termed the 'Imperiall crowne' in contemporary accounts) and finally in 'very rich' crowns made specifically for each of their coronations. Three crowns were also present at the coronation of Elizabeth I, and she was probably crowned in the same fashion as her predecessors. James I reverted to the tradition of being crowned with St Edward's Crown only before donning his own crown to depart Westminster Abbey.

Following the abolition of the monarchy and the execution of Charles I in 1649, all royal crowns were broken up by order of parliament. Upon the Restoration of the monarchy in 1660, a new state crown was made for Charles II by Sir Robert Vyner. About 10 versions of the state crown have existed since the Restoration, including the State Crown of George I, made in 1714. George IV had wished his own coronation crown of 1821 to be purchased by parliament and used for state occasions but it was judged too expensive.

== Imperial State Crown of Queen Victoria ==
For the Coronation of Queen Victoria in 1838, a new and lighter imperial state crown was created, and this is the basis for today's crown. Made by Rundell and Bridge using old and new jewels, it had a crimson velvet cap with ermine border and a lining of white silk. It weighed 39.25 troy ounces (43.06 oz; 1,221 g) and was decorated with 1,363 brilliant-cut, 1,273 rose-cut and 147 table-cut diamonds, 277 pearls, 17 sapphires (including St Edward's Sapphire, thought to have been taken from the Confessor's ring when his body was reinterred at Westminster Abbey in 1163), 11 emeralds, 4 rubies, and the Black Prince's Ruby (a cabochon red spinel).

At the State Opening of Parliament in 1845, the Duke of Argyll was carrying the crown before Queen Victoria when it fell off the cushion and broke. Victoria wrote in her diary, "it was all crushed and squashed like a pudding that had sat down". Victoria had a small crown made in 1870, which resembled the Tudor Crown; she thenceforward declined to wear the 1838 crown, which she found heavy and uncomfortable and was incompatible with her widow's weeds. In 1909, the larger crown was altered to accommodate the 317-carat (63 g) Cullinan II diamond, also known as the Second Star of Africa.

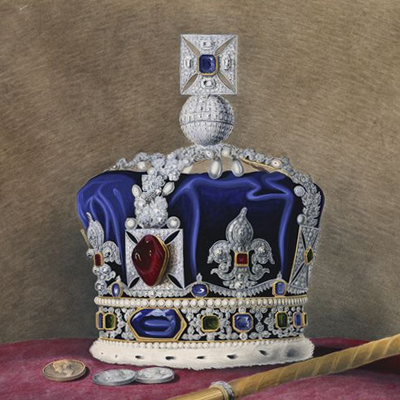
Hand-coloured lithograph of Queen Victoria's Imperial State Crown

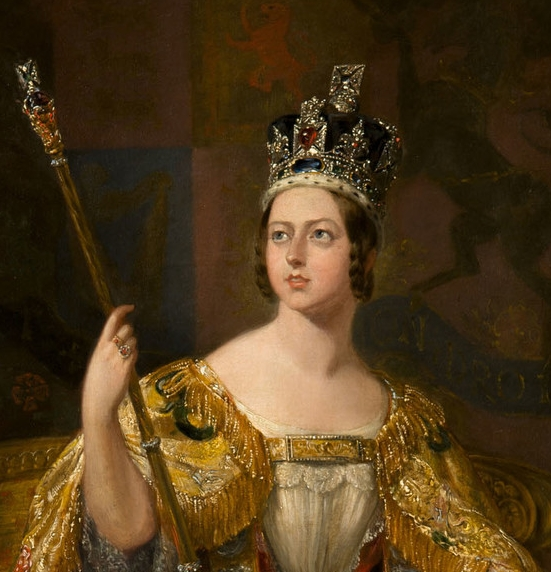
Queen Victoria depicted wearing the 1838 Imperial State Crown for her coronation portrait

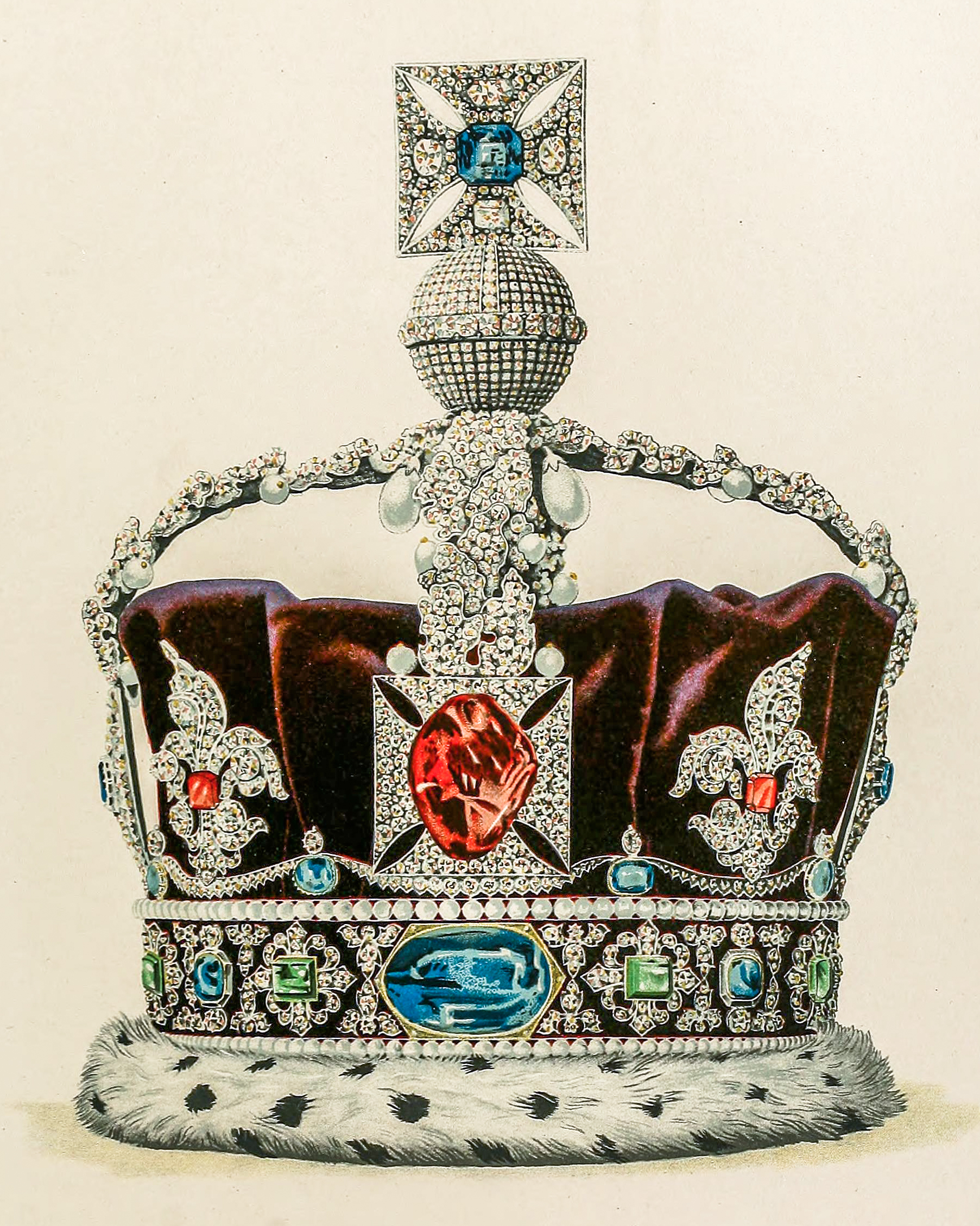
Imperial State Crown, 1904

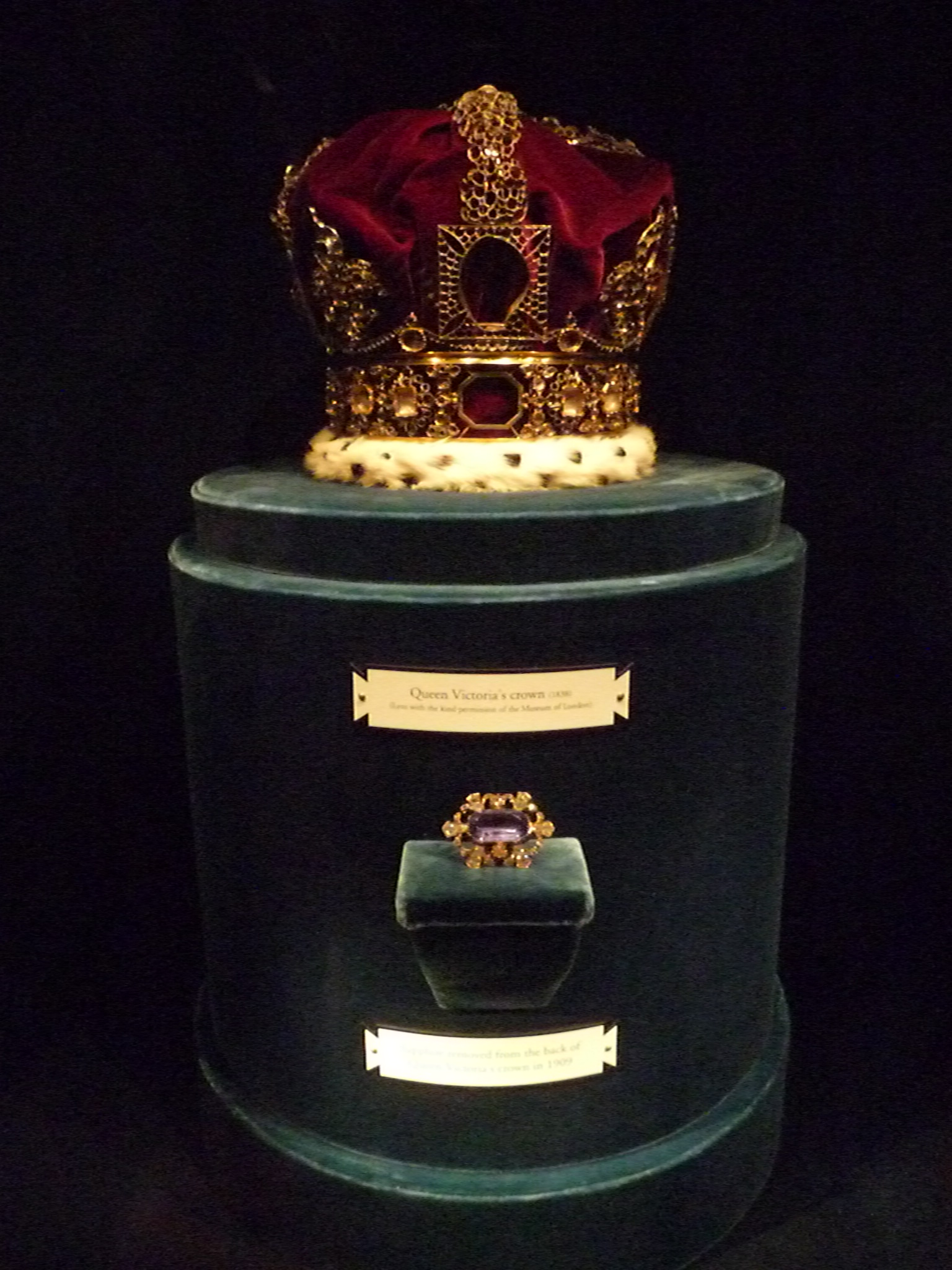
The emptied frame of Queen Victoria's Imperial State Crown

== 1937 Imperial State Crown ==
A faithful copy of the 1838 crown, which had fallen into a poor state of repair, was made in 1937 by the jewellers Garrard & Co. for George VI. The crown's inner headband was adjusted and its arches lowered by 1 in (2.5 cm) in 1953 for Queen Elizabeth II. The empty frame of Victoria's crown survives in the Royal Collection, and is now on display in the Tower Jewel House, minus its monde and cross which now sit on the current crown.

=== Description ===
External videos
- Newsreel of the 1953 alteration work (black and white)
- Clip from Monarchy: The Royal Family at Work (2007)
- Clip from The Coronation (2018)
- Short HD video of the crown by Royal Collection Trust (2023)

The Imperial State Crown is 31.5 cm (12.4 in) tall and weighs 1.06 kg (2.3 lb), and has four fleurs-de-lis alternating with four crosses pattée, supporting two arches topped by a monde and cross pattée. Its purple velvet cap is trimmed with ermine. The frame is made of gold, silver and platinum, and decorated with 2,868 diamonds, 269 pearls, 17 sapphires, 11 emeralds, and 5 rubies.

Notable stones are St Edward's Sapphire on the top cross, reputedly taken from the ring of Edward the Confessor when he was re-interred at Westminster Abbey in 1163, and the Black Prince's Ruby (a large spinel) on the front cross. In 1909, the 104-carat (21 g) Stuart Sapphire, set in the front of the crown, was moved to the back and replaced by the 317-carat (63 g) Cullinan II. Below the monde hang four pearls, three of which are often said to have belonged to Queen Elizabeth I, but this association is almost certainly erroneous.

=== Usage ===
The crown is worn by the monarch on leaving Westminster Abbey at the end of his or her coronation. It is usually also worn at State Openings of Parliament, although Elizabeth II wore a hat in March 1974, June 2017 and December 2019 after snap general elections, and in May 2021; and, in October 2019 she wore the State Diadem, while the Imperial State Crown was carried beside her. Usually, it is taken to the Palace of Westminster under armed guard in its own carriage and placed in the Robing Room, where the monarch dons the Robe of State and puts on the crown before giving the speech to Parliament. If a State Opening occurs before a coronation, the crown is placed on a cushion beside the monarch. In 1689, one week after being proclaimed king, William III wore his crown in Parliament to pass the Crown and Parliament Recognition Act 1689. When not in use, the Imperial State Crown is on public display in the Jewel House at the Tower of London.

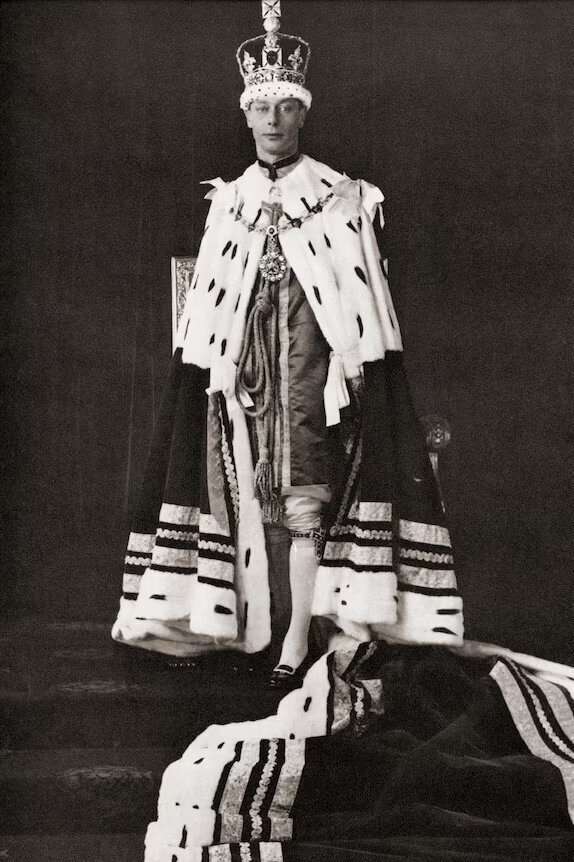
George VI in the 1937 Imperial State Crown, showing its original height

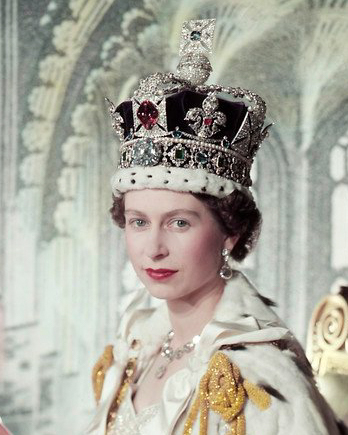
Elizabeth II wearing the Imperial State Crown, which was reduced in height for her coronation in 1953

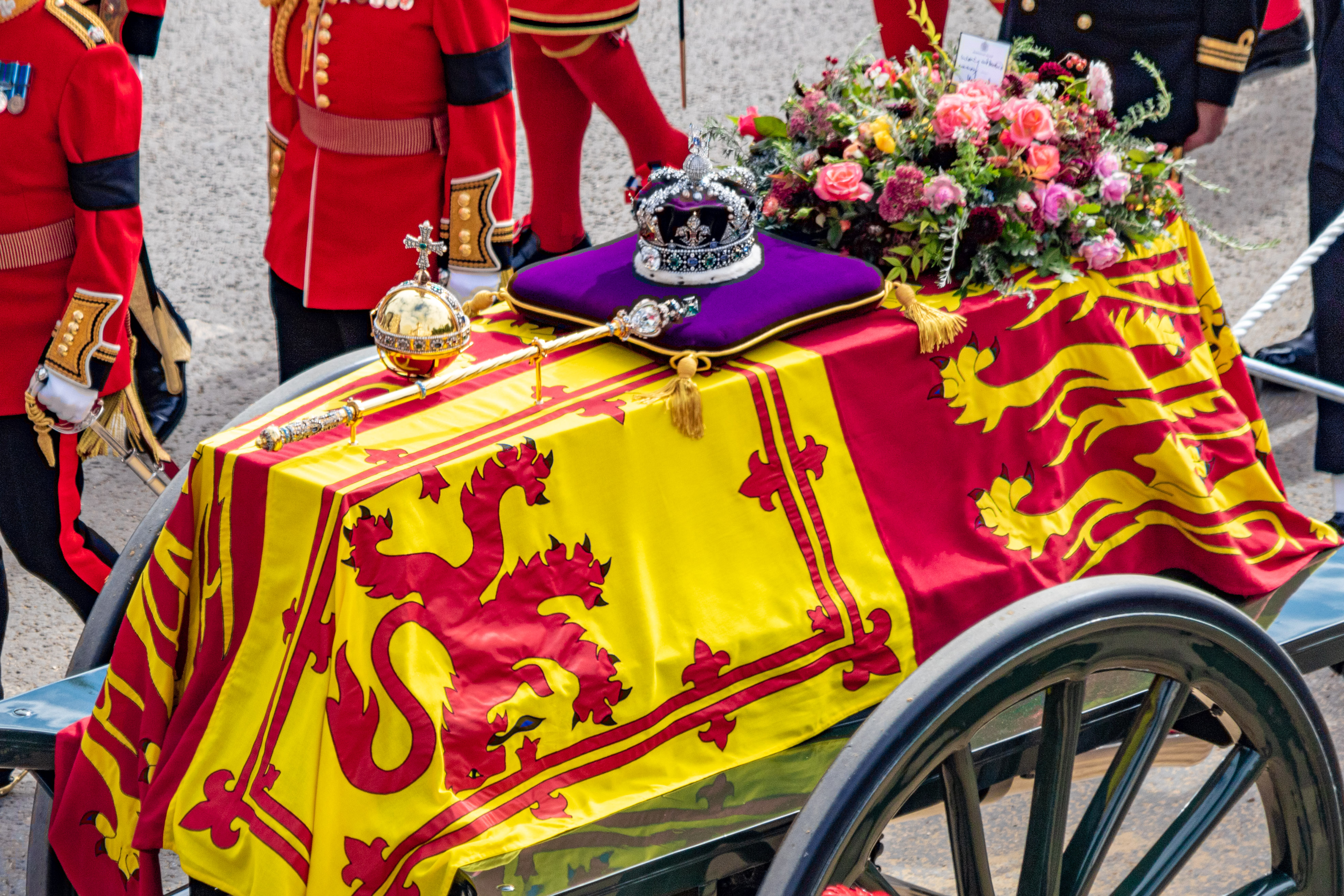
The crown on Elizabeth II's coffin, with the Sovereign's Sceptre and Orb during her state funeral in September 2022

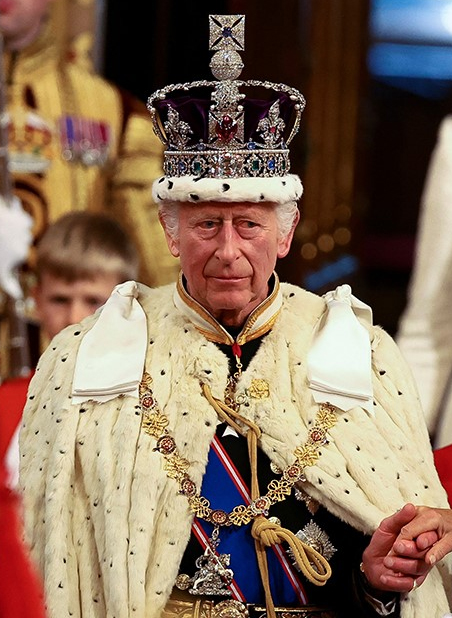
Charles III wearing the crown to the 2024 State Opening of Parliament

== See also ==
- Imperial Crown of India

== Bibliography ==
- Kenneth J. Mears; Simon Thurley; Claire Murphy (1994). The Crown Jewels. Historic Royal Palaces. ASIN B000HHY1ZQ.
- Dale Hoak (2002). Tudor Political Culture. Cambridge University Press. ISBN 978-0-521-52014-0.
