= William Summers (jeweller) =

William Hamilton Summers LVO (4 October 1930 – 19 June 2002), was the British Crown Jeweller for almost 30 years, a post he held as a director of the London jewellery firm Garrard & Co.

Summers was born in Burnham, Buckinghamshire, and attended King's School, Bruton. He did National Service with the 13th/18th Hussars then joined Garrard as an apprentice where he succeeded Cecil Mann as the Crown Jeweller in 1962, a post he held until his retirement in 1991. He was succeeded by David V. Thomas.
