= Tudor Crown =

Crown of Tudor monarchs and heraldic device

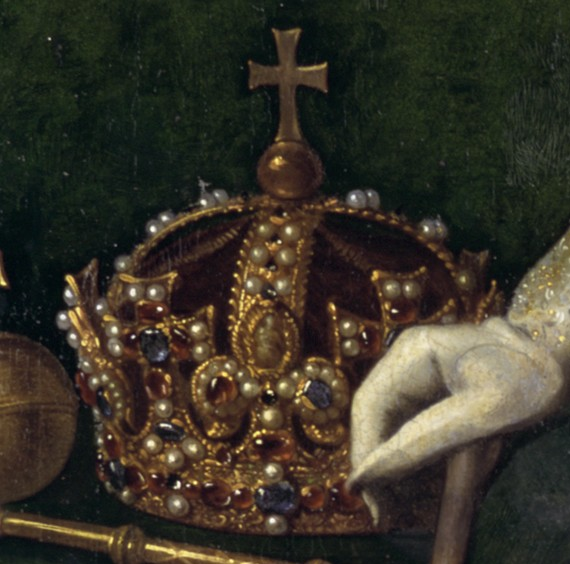
- The crown in a 1629 portrait of Charles I

Heraldic depictions

Details
- Country: Kingdom of England
- Made: No later than 1521
- Destroyed: 1649
- Weight: 90 ozt (6.17 lb; 2.80 kg) (Note: At the time of its destruction.)
- Arches: 2
- Material: Gold
- Cap: Purple silk velvet lined with black silk satin and no fur
- Notable stones: 344 jewels, gems and pearls
- Successors: State Crown of Charles II

The Tudor Crown, also known as the Imperial Crown, was a crown created in the early 16th century for either Henry VII or Henry VIII, the first Tudor monarchs of England, and destroyed in 1649 during the English Civil War. It was described by the art historian Sir Roy Strong as "a masterpiece of early Tudor jeweller's art".

A representation of the Tudor Crown is a widely used symbol in the heraldry of the United Kingdom. In use officially from 1901 to 1952 and again since 2022 on the accession of Charles III, it is used to represent the Crown as the sovereign source of governmental authority. As such, it appears on numerous official emblems in the United Kingdom, other Commonwealth realms, and the former British Empire.

== Origins ==
Its date of manufacture is unknown, but Henry VII or his son and successor Henry VIII probably commissioned the crown, first documented in writing in a 1521 inventory of Henry VIII's jewels, naming the crown as "the king's crown of gold". The crown was mentioned again in 1532, 1547, 1550, 1574, 1597 and 1606, also featuring in portraits of Charles I.

Henry V is the first English monarch to be depicted in heraldry wearing an imperial crown, and the first to be referred to as an emperor in his kingdom. An imperial crown appeared on the great seal of England after 1471 and on the coinage of Henry VII from 1489. Cuthbert Tunstall wrote to Henry VIII in 1517, "the Crown of England is an Empire of itself ... for which cause your Grace weareth a closed crown."

== Description ==
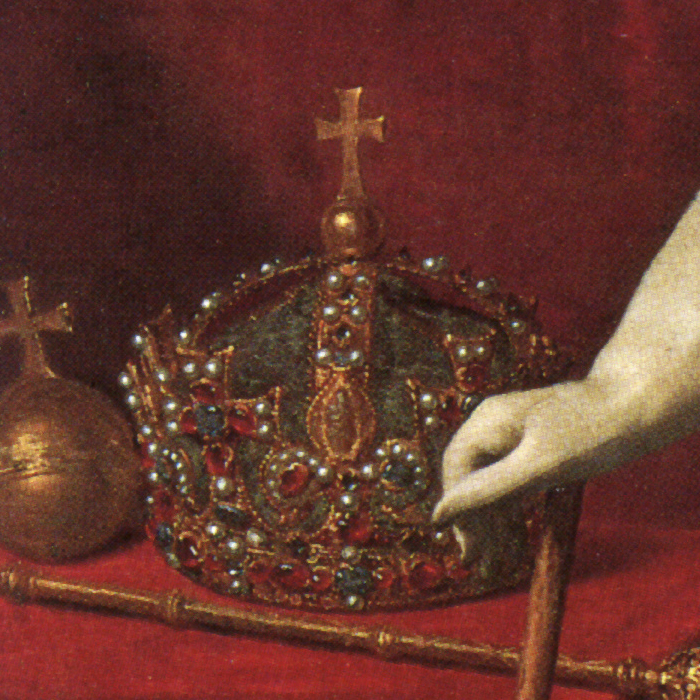
The crown in a 1631 portrait of Charles I; the image of a figure is visible in the upper leaf of the fleur-de-lis.

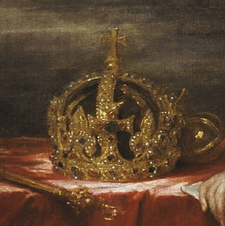
Some depictions, such as this 1632 portrait, show gold coloured ribbons or seams on the cap.

The crown is first described in an inventory made of Henry VIII's jewels in 1521:

Furste the kingis crowne of golde the Bordour garnisshed with Six Balacys (Note: Balas rubies.) ffyve Saphures fyve pointed Diamoundys twanty Rubyes xix pearlys and iiij Collettis (Note: Collettis, the rims or necks of gold in which gems are set.) the Balacys with the king And one of the crosses of the same Crowne garnisshed w^{t} a greate Saphure an Emade Crased (Note: Crased i.e. broken.) iiij Balacys and ix pearlis not all of a sorte Item on the lefte side of the same Crosse a fflourre de luce set w^{t} An ymage of Cryste with A greate Balace Brooken A less Balace A poynted dyamounde...

Henry Rex (Note: Page signed by Henry VIII on 14 February 1521.)

two pearlis and the Collet where a fayre Balace stode and A crampon (Note: Crampon, a cramp or setting.) where the pearle stode. the Balace and the pearle w^{t} the king and next that a nother Crosse w^{t} a course saphure iiij course balacys a fayre litle Emerade A lozenged Diamonde like a harte a ruby viij plis and a crampon where the pearle stode the pearle w^{t} the king, and next that another ffloure de luce sett w^{t} a saunte George a fayre balace a poynted Diamounde and thre plis A collett where a Balace stode The Balace with the king in oon leaf And of the other leaf both collett and Balace with the king and next that Another Crosse w^{t} a large Eounde Saphure iiij Balacys iiij plys and a Collett the emerade w^{t} the king and v crampons the pearlis w^{t} the king and next that An other flour de luce set with our ladyes ymage and hir childe A Balace A poynted Diamonde thre pearlis and two Collettis The Balace w^{t} the king and next that A nother Crosse set w^{t} two Saphures iiij balacys viij pearlis and a crampon where the pearle stode, The pearle w^{t} the king And nexte that An other flour de luce set w^{t} an ymage of Cryste A Balace A poynted Diamonde thre pearlis and ij colletis The balace w^{t} the king and next that An other Crosse set w^{t} a course Saphure iiij balacys ix pearlis And a Collett The Emerade w^{t} the king And next that an other flower Deluce sett w^{t} an ymage of Criste w^{t} a Balace a smalle poynted Diamounde thre pearlis and two Collettys the Balace w^{t} the king Item oon the Diademe above twelf poynted diamoundys some better then the other thre Tryangled diamoundys oon table diamounde and xxviij pearlis two in A troche (Note: A Troche. A cluster. This word often occurs in old Jewel lists; it is a French word, and is still extant in the form of Trochet.) poysaunt to gidders ...

It took the form of a closed crown, originally with two arches, with five crosses pattée alternating with five fleurs-de-lis. It was decorated with 344 jewels, gems and pearls, including 21 sapphires, 2 emeralds, 27 diamonds and 233 pearls of different sizes. The 1521 inventory states that many of these jewels were held by Henry and not permanently kept in the crown.

In the centre petals of the fleurs-de-lis were gold and enamel figurines of the Virgin Mary, St George and three images of Christ. Comparing the 1521 and 1547 inventories, it is evident that the crown was repaired and altered during this period. Following the English Reformation, and in order to express the religious authority of the monarchy, the three figures of Christ were removed and replaced by three Kings of England: St Edmund, St Edward the Confessor and Henry VI, who at that time was also venerated as a saint. The cap within the crown was of purple silk velvet and lined with black silk satin, with no fur on the cap, as noted in the 1547 inventory.

== Usage ==
Henry VIII wore the crown during court ceremonies, in particular at Christmas when Henry would process to chapel in his coronation regalia. The crown was used at the coronation of Edward VI in 1547, the coronation of Mary I in 1553 and the coronation of Elizabeth I in 1559. Both Edward VI and Mary I were crowned with three crowns in succession: first St Edward's Crown, second the Tudor Crown (termed the "Imperiall crowne" in contemporary accounts) and finally in "very rich" crowns made specifically for each of their coronations. Three crowns were also present at the coronation of Elizabeth I, and she was probably crowned in the same fashion as her predecessors. James I reverted to the tradition of being crowned with St Edward's Crown only before donning his own crown to depart Westminster Abbey. James annexed the Tudor Crown (termed "the Imperiall Crowne of this Realme") along with his own crown and some other jewels to the Crown in 1606, and the Tudor Crown featured in many portraits of Charles I.

== Destruction ==
Following the abolition of the monarchy and the execution of Charles I in 1649, the Tudor Crown was broken up by order of parliament under the supervision of Sir Henry Mildmay. The gold frame was melted down and turned into coins while the jewels were sold off in packets, raising £1,100. According to an inventory drawn up for the sale of the king's goods, it weighed 7 lb 6 oz troy (6.17 lb; 2.80 kg). A second copy of the parliamentary records gives slightly different valuations and also provides more detail, noting the image of the Virgin Mary in one of the fleur-de-lis. The crown featured in several vanitas paintings following the abolition of the monarchy.

One of the royal figurines may have survived: a statuette of Henry VI matching the contemporary depiction of the crown was uncovered in 2017 by metal detectorist Kevin Duckett. The location, "at Great Oxendon...between Naseby and Market Harborough", was on the route taken by Charles I of England as he fled after the Battle of Naseby and may have been lost at that time. The figurine was likely featured on Henry VIII's crown according to some sources. As of February 2021, the figure was being held at the British Museum for assessment and further research. According to historian and Charles I biographer Leanda de Lisle, "the crown was melted down on the orders of Oliver Cromwell but it is believed the figurine – which was one of several adorning the royal treasure – could already have been removed."

== Replica ==
In 2012, Historic Royal Palaces used the historic written inventories of the royal jewels along with portrait paintings featuring the crown to commission a replica. It was made by retired Crown Jeweller Harry Collins using 344 pearls and gemstones and employing authentic Tudor metalworking techniques. Other examples of 16th century goldsmith work were used to inform the fine details, particularly the Crown of Scotland. It is exhibited as part of an exhibition within the Chapel Royal at Hampton Court Palace.

The replica is made of solid silver with a hard gold plating and gilded with a fine gold finish in order to recreate how the crown would have appeared in gold.

== Heraldry ==
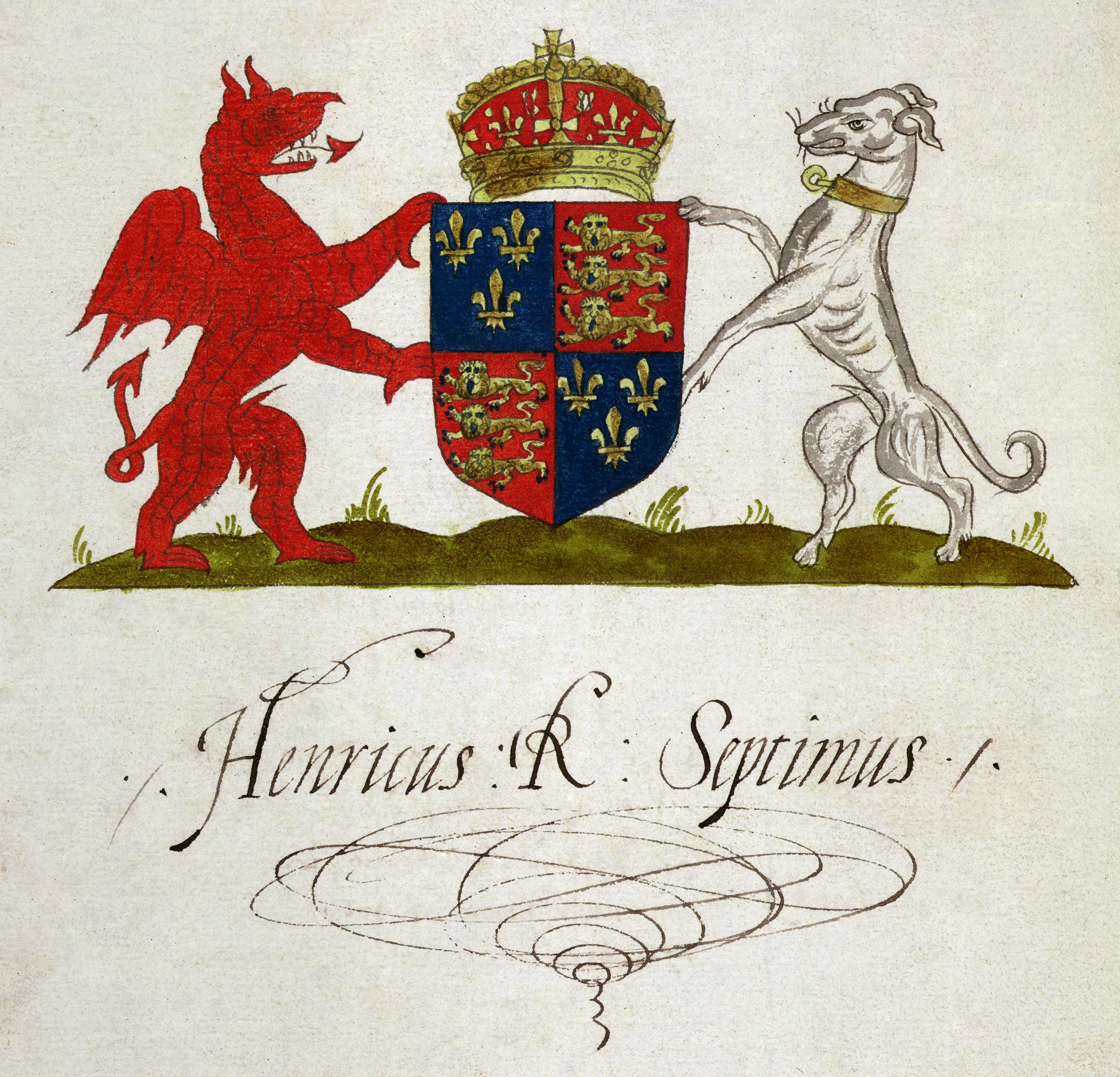
Arms of Henry VII of England, painted c.1589

The heraldic depictions of the royal crown have undergone many changes in their form and enrichment. The crown began to assume its present form in the reign of Henry V. Henry V's crown consisted of a jewelled circlet heightened by four crosses pattée alternating with eight fleurs-de-lis in pairs, and two arches springing from behind the crosses and supporting at the top a mound and cross. In some reigns, additional arches were used, and the number of crosses pattée and fleurs-de-lis varied. By the reign of Charles I, the heraldic crown was depicted similarly to the Tudor Crown which had four crosses pattée alternating with four fleurs-de-lis, and also four arches rising almost to a point, the arches being studded with pearls. This crown was destroyed during the English Civil War.

After the restoration of the monarchy, Charles II based both his state crown and heraldic crown on the new St Edward's Crown of 1661. (Note: The original St Edward's Crown had been destroyed with the abolition of the monarchy in 1649.) It had four crosses pattée alternating with four fleurs-de-lis; the number of arches was reduced to two and the curvature of the arches was depressed at the point of intersection. On this pattern the royal crown was depicted until the reign of Queen Victoria. Although Fox-Davies states that the St Edward's Crown is supposed to be heraldically represented over the royal arms and other insignia because "it is the 'official' crown of England", various other crowns were depicted under Victoria, whose coronation, unusually, did not feature the St Edward's Crown at all. Early depictions of the Royal Arms during her reign featured the Imperial State Crown which was created for Victoria's coronation in 1838 and was similar to the St Edward's Crown but with a flatter top. However, depictions varied depending on the artist.

In 1876, Victoria was proclaimed Empress of India, and in 1880, the heraldic crown was altered to give it a more imperial form by making the arches semi-circular. However, Victoria had favoured a Tudor style crown since at least the 1860s. Victoria had featured in William Wyon's gothic crown coin in 1847, and the Palace of Westminster, rebuilt from 1840 to 1876, makes extensive use of a gothic style crown. The British had assumed direct rule over India in 1858, and the Order of the Star of India, created in 1861, depicted a Tudor Crown from its inception. Victoria had a new crown made in 1870 which resembled the Tudor Crown, declining to wear the Imperial State Crown which she found heavy and uncomfortable.

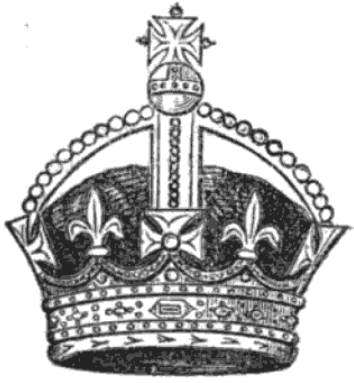
A heraldic crown of Queen Victoria from 1865, one of several used during Victoria's reign

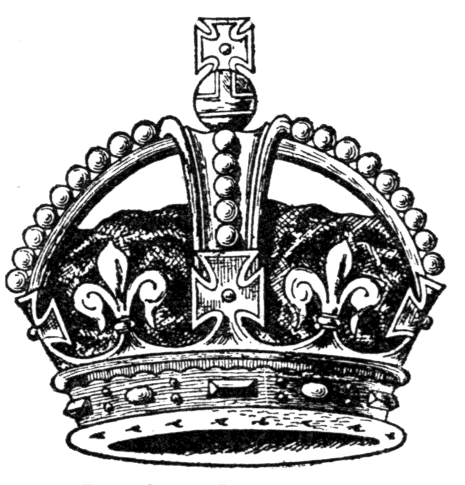
The authorised heraldic crown of 1901 which was standardised across the British Empire

The heraldic crown of 2022 with a plain circlet, differently arranged jewels, and larger crosses and ermine

After the accession of Edward VII, the War Office raised the issue of a standardised design of the crown for use by the British Army, there being in use several crowns of different patterns. On 4 May 1901, the king approved a single Tudor Crown design based on the crown of Henry VII, as "chosen and always used by Queen Victoria personally". The design of the crown and the new royal cypher was issued as a sealed pattern by the War Office rather than by the College of Arms. The 1901 pattern crown depicted a thin ermine lining below a golden circlet holding a crimson cap; the circlet jewelled with an oblong shaped ruby in the centre between two oval emeralds and two oblong sapphires on the outside. Each jewel is separated by two small vertically arranged pearls. Above the jewels, an invected line and a band supporting two fleurs-de-lis between three crosses pattée, each cross studded with a pearl in the centre. There are nine larger pearls on each of the outer half-arches and five pearls on the central half-arch. The outer arches rise in a semi-circle, with no depression or flattening, to support a mound, while the central half-arch widens as it rises, appearing to sit slightly above the outer arch. The mound is an emerald banded in gold topped with a small golden cross which is centrally studded with a small pearl. The coronet of the Prince of Wales created for the 1902 coronation was heraldically represented similarly to the 1901 pattern crown, minus the central half-arch.

George VI had ceased to use the style "Emperor of India" in 1948 following India's independence in 1947, and on the accession of Elizabeth II in 1952, she opted to change from the 1901 Tudor Crown to a design resembling St Edward's Crown, similar to that last used before the reign of Victoria.

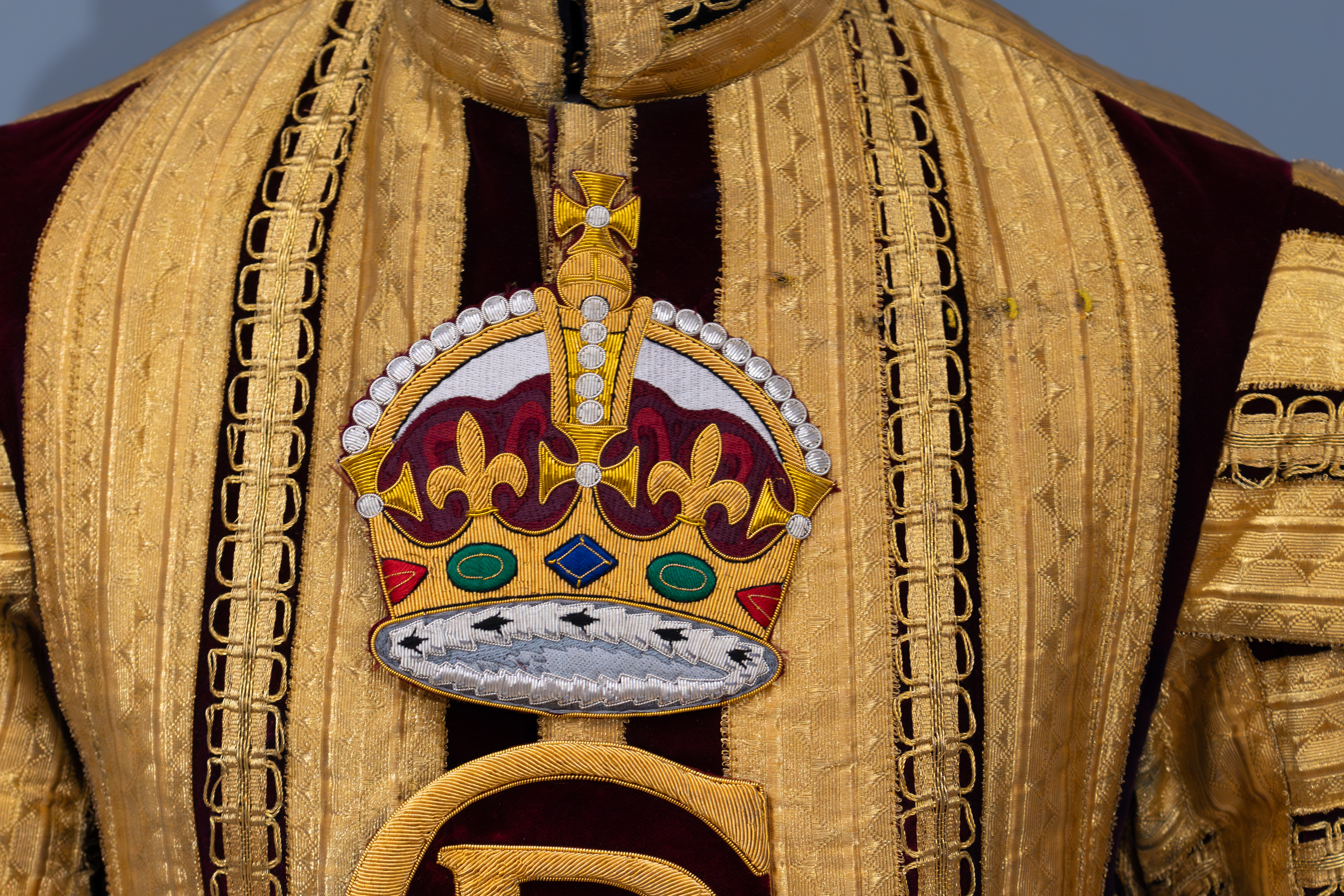
The 2022 Tudor Crown on the uniform of a state trumpeter of the Household Cavalry

Charles III adopted the Tudor Crown on his accession in 2022, similar to that last used under George VI but with some differences. The circlet is plain with larger jewels, crosses and ermine. In addition to being larger, the jewels in the circlet are arranged differently to the 1901 pattern and in different shapes. In the centre is a sapphire between two emeralds, and the outermost jewels are rubies, mirroring the heraldic St Edward's Crown of Elizabeth II. The sapphire and rubies are in a rhombus shape rather than oblong, while the emeralds are oval in shape. Unlike the 1901 Tudor Crown, the mound is solid gold rather than emerald banded in gold. The cap of the heraldic crowns is always represented as crimson, regardless of the colour of any actual crowns.

Badges for the British armed forces featuring the Tudor Crown design were announced in March 2023 in time for the coronation in May. However, the Financial Times reported in June 2024 that the rollout of the new British Army cap badges had been delayed by fears that badges manufactured in China may contain tracking devices or transmitters. The Cabinet Office released guidance for the use of the Tudor Crown by UK police forces and other Crown institutions in July 2023. In Canada, a specifically Canadian design was unveiled which takes inspiration from the Tudor Crown but differs significantly in detailing and has been controversial. The Tudor Crown design was rolled out in the Australian Defence Force from 2025.

Under section 4 of the Trade Marks Act 1994, images of the royal crowns may not be used in a trade mark in the UK (or in a country which is party to the Paris Convention) without permission. Section 99 of the act also restricts business use of images of the crowns in a way which is calculated to give the impression that the user is an employee of, or a supplier to, the King or a member of the royal family. The Lord Chamberlain's Office governs the use of depictions of the royal crowns and also maintains a selection of images which may be used without infringement.

== Gallery ==
=== In portraiture ===
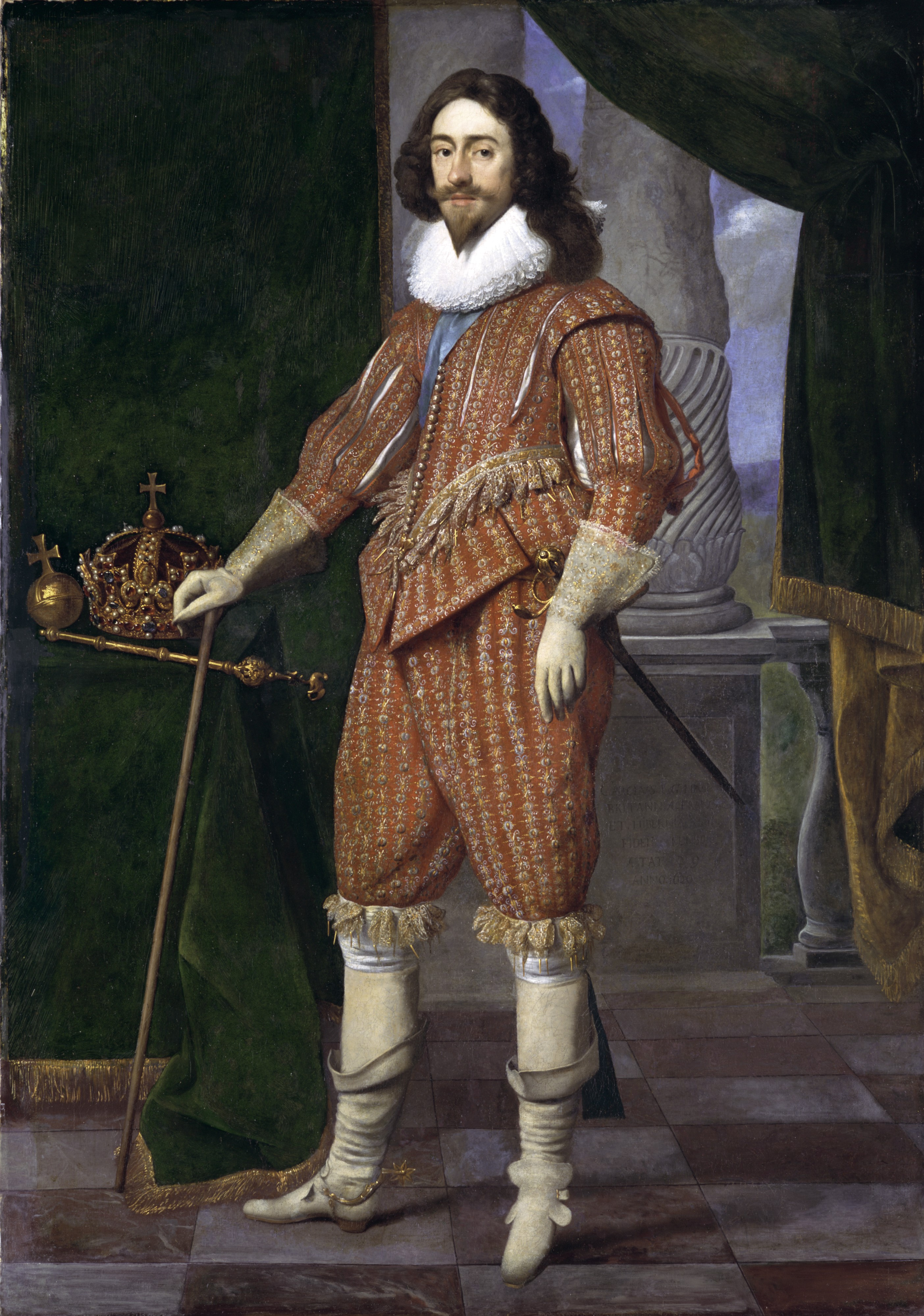
Charles I depicted with the Tudor Crown, by Daniël Mijtens, 1629

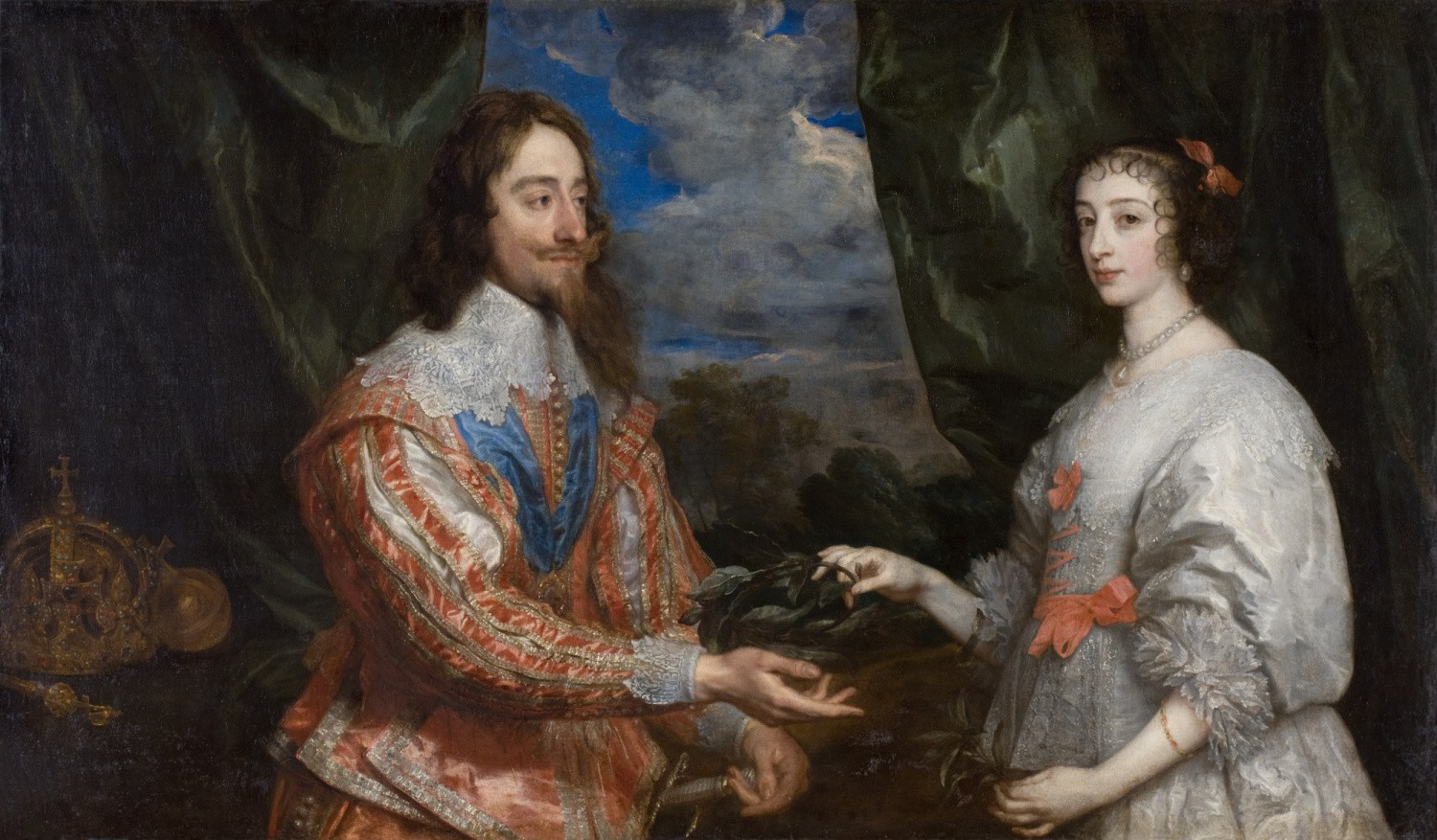
1632 portrait of Charles I and Henrietta Maria by Anthony van Dyck

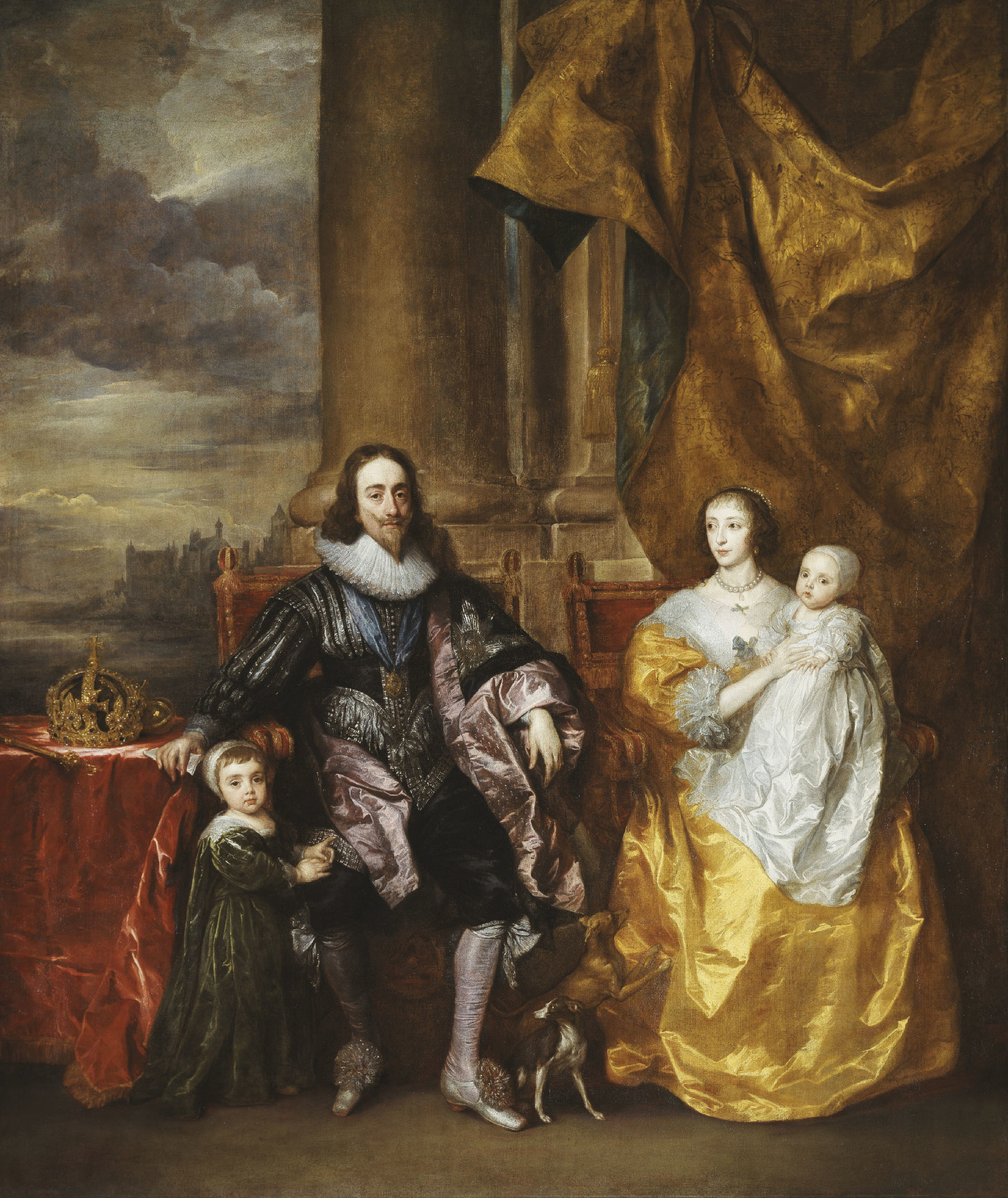
Family of Charles I depicted with the Tudor Crown, by Anthony van Dyck 1632

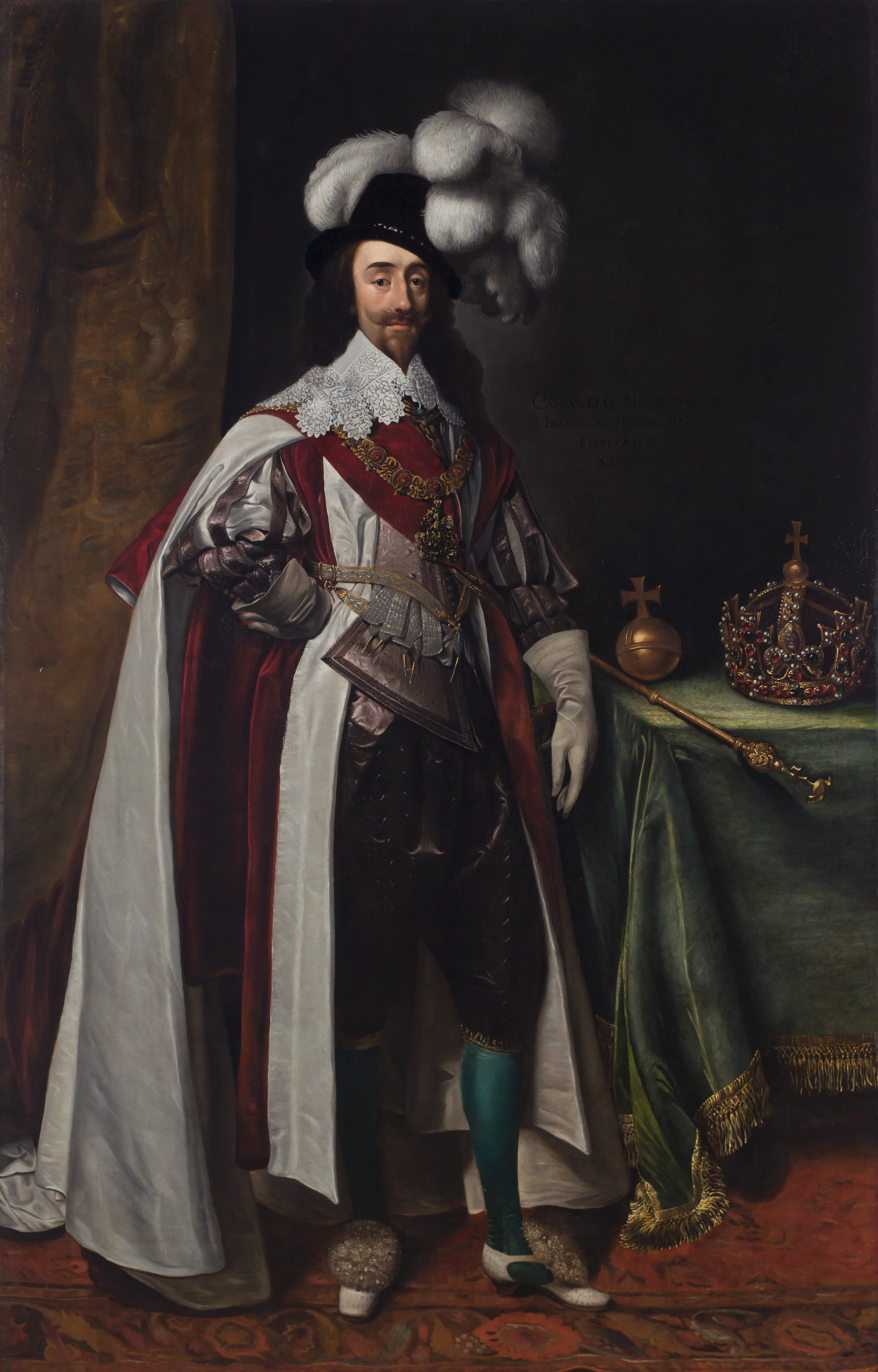
Charles I depicted with the Tudor Crown, Daniël Mijtens, 1633

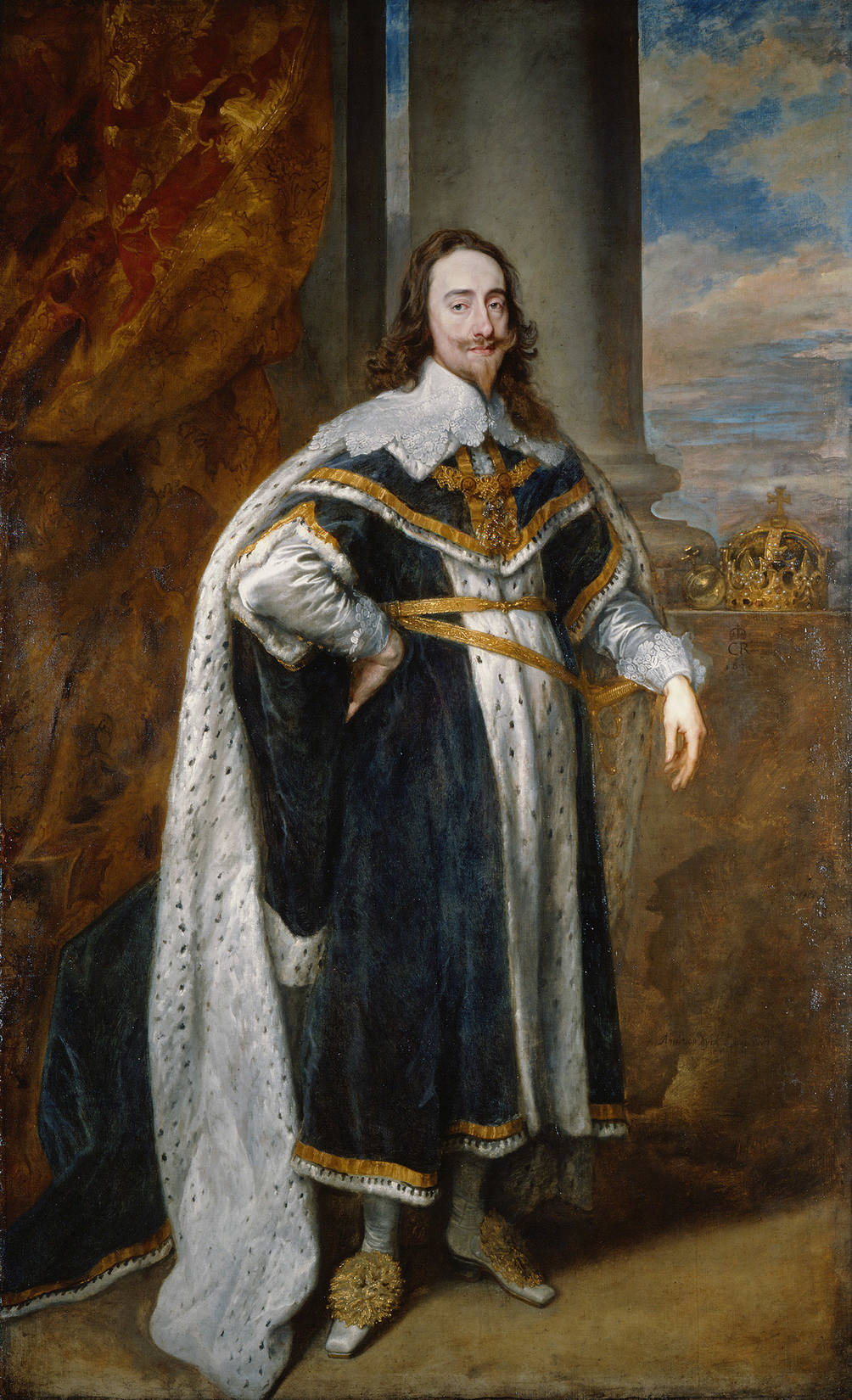
Charles I depicted with the Tudor Crown, Anthony van Dyck, 1636

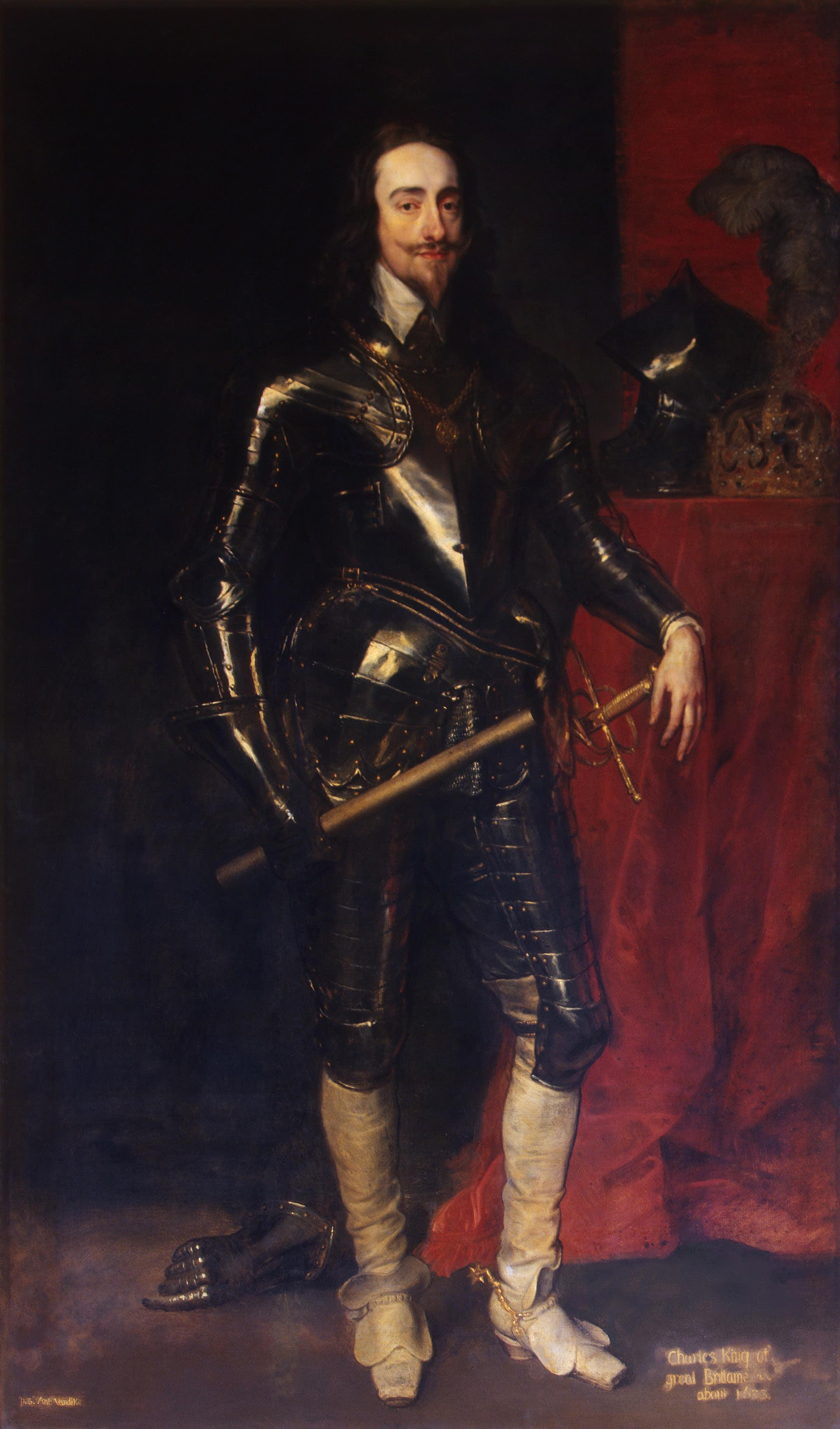
Charles I depicted with the Tudor Crown, after Anthony van Dyck, 1638

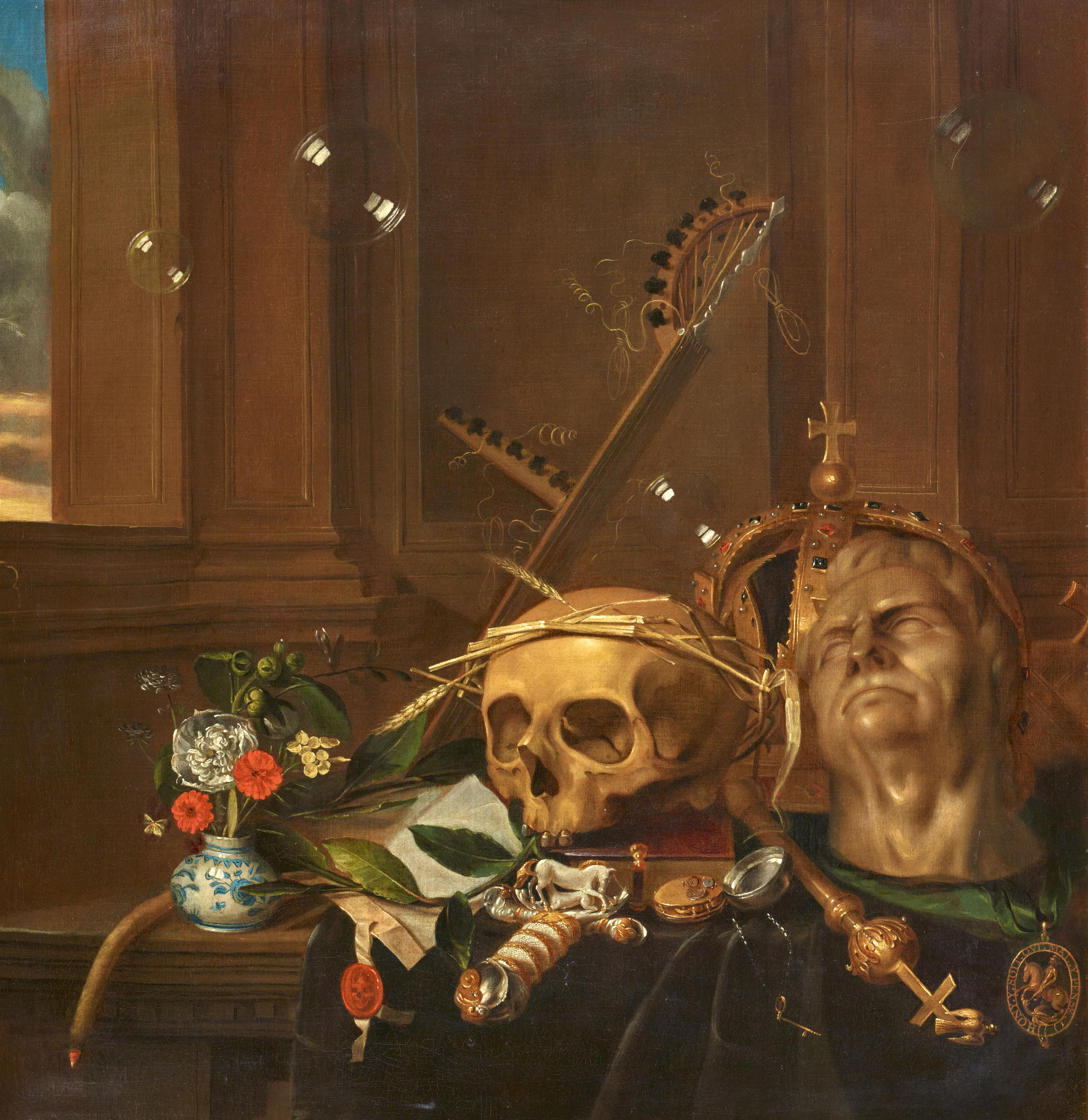
Vanitas by Hendrick Andriessen, 1640–1655

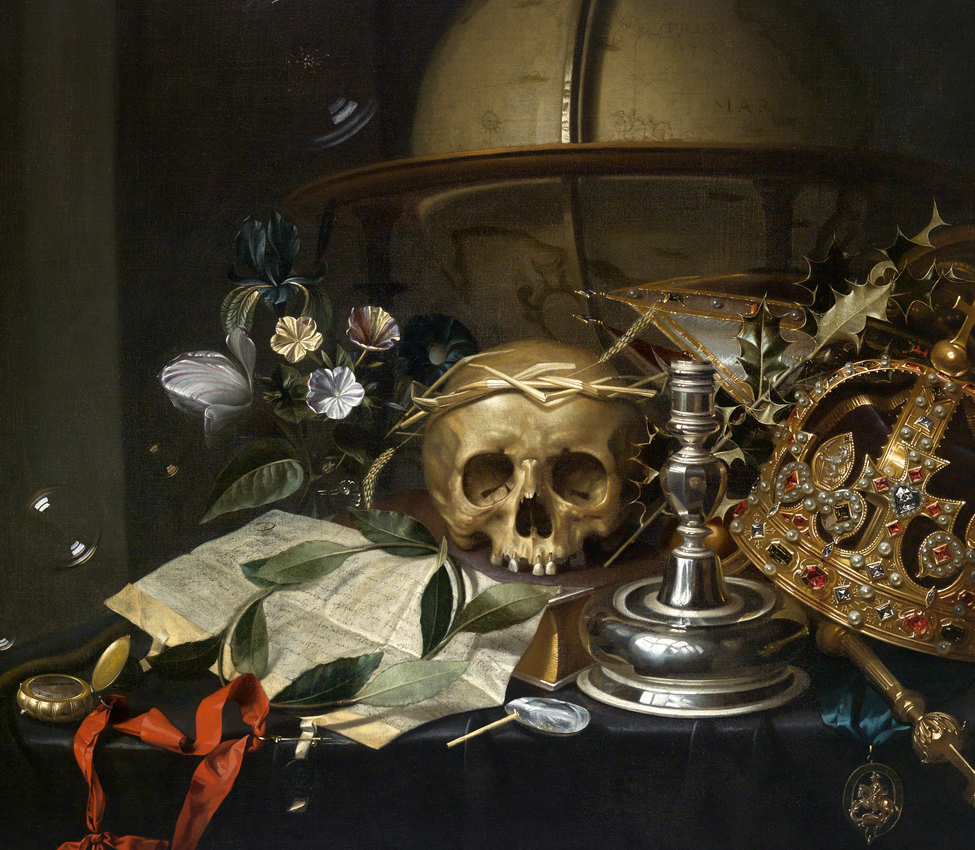
Vanitas by Hendrick Andriessen, c.1650–1655

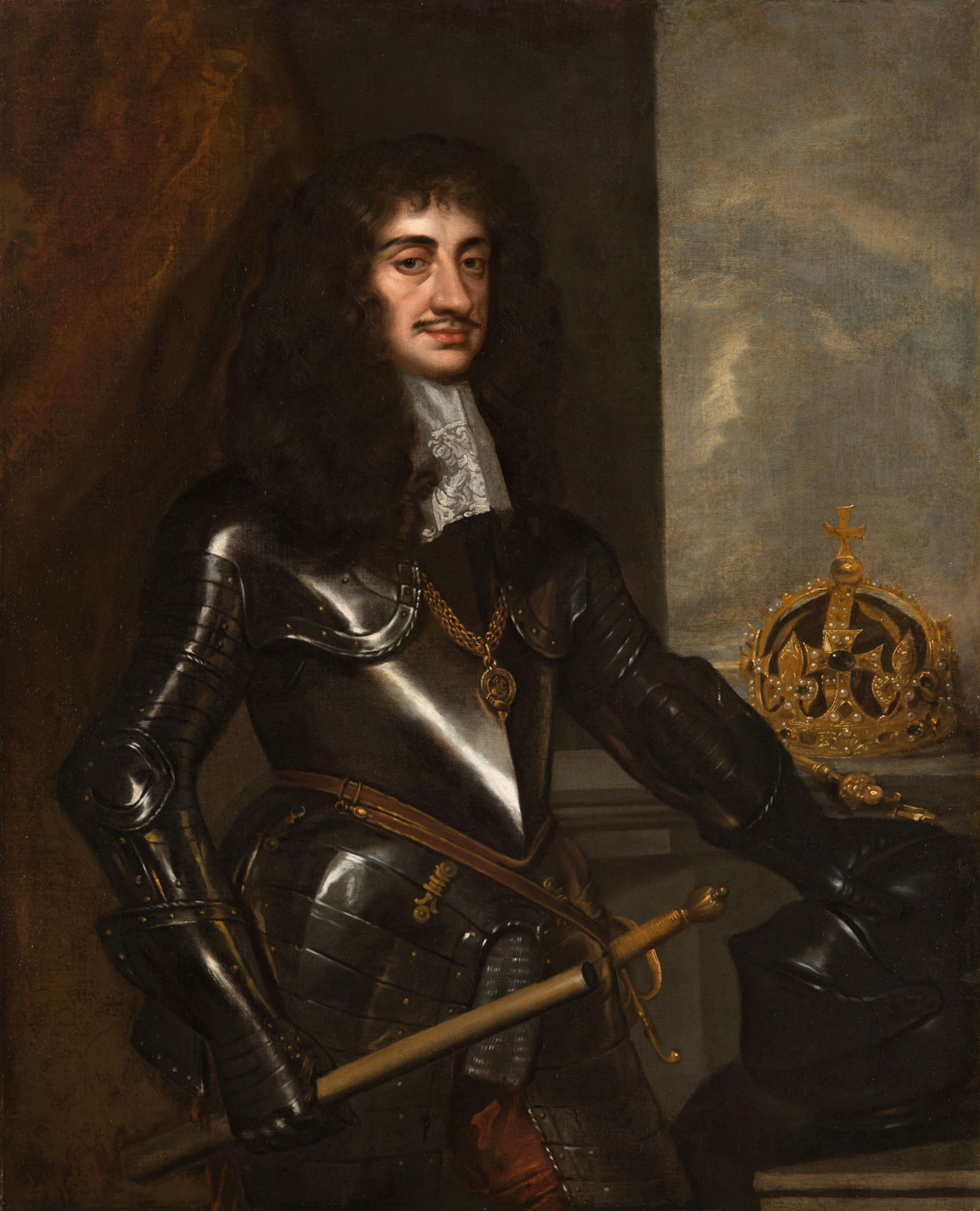
Charles II depicted with the Tudor Crown, painted after its destruction, Peter Lely, c.1670

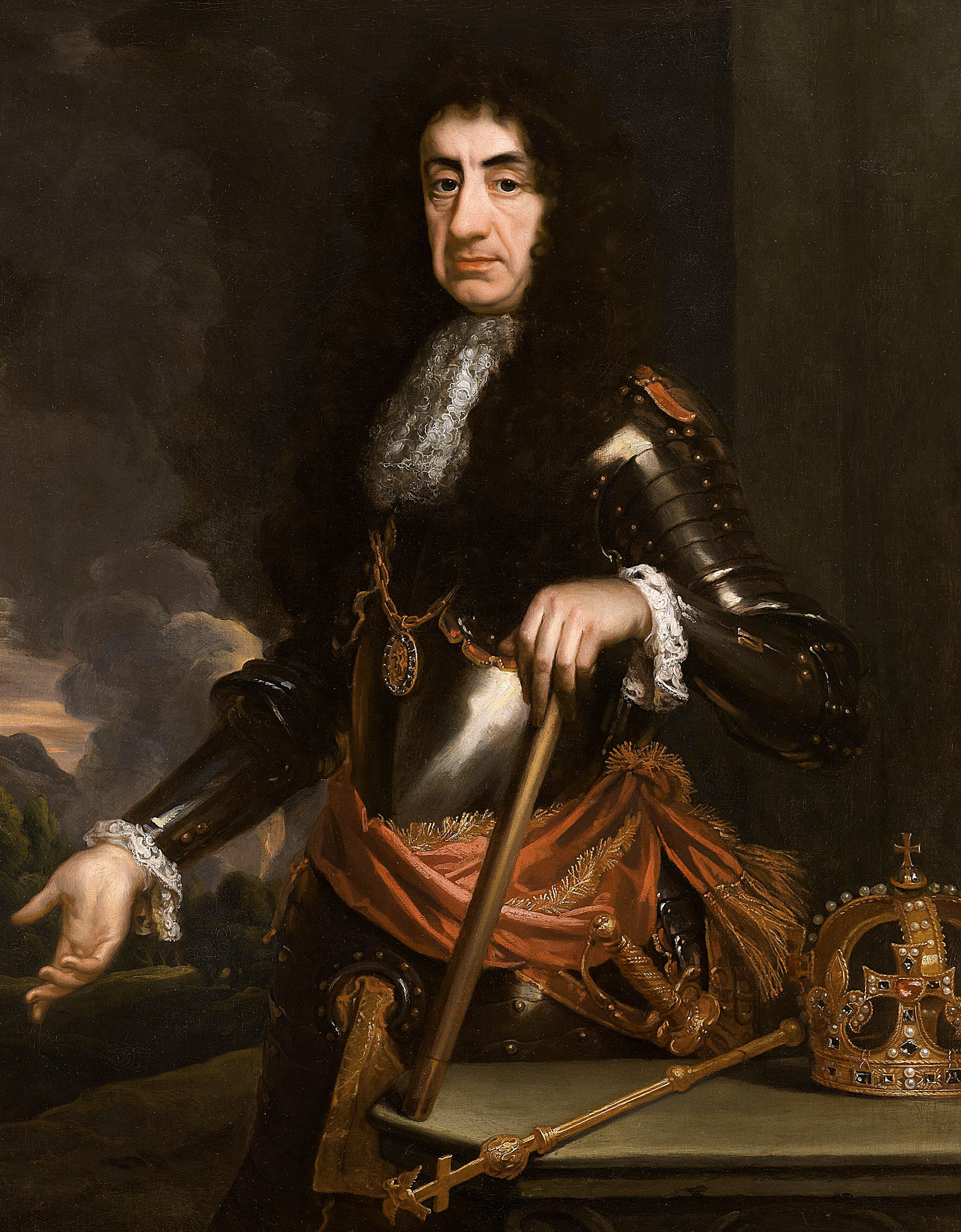
Charles II, John Riley, between circa 1683 and circa 1684

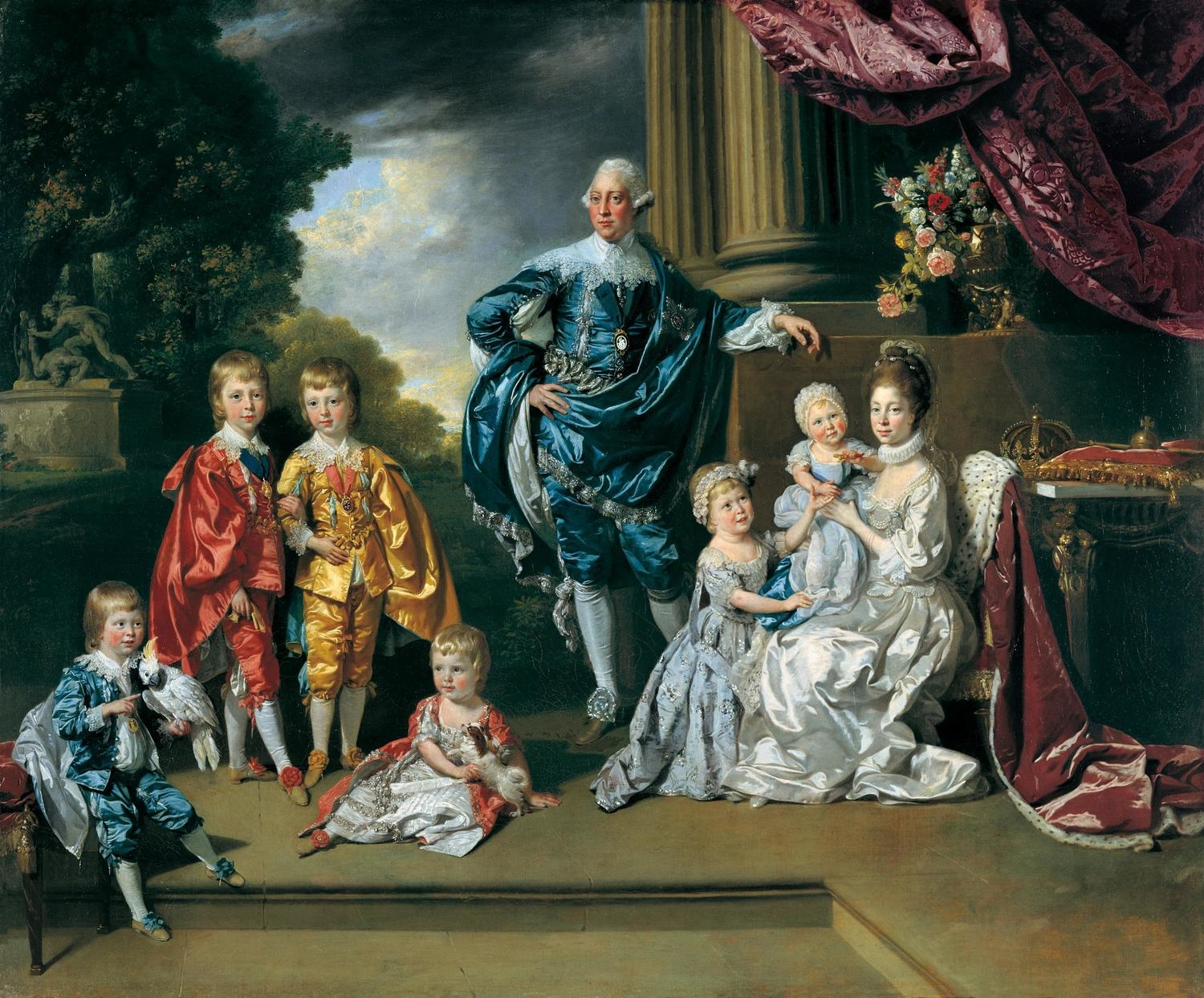
George III and his family depicted in 'Vandyke dress' with the Tudor Crown by Johan Zoffany, 1770

== See also ==
- Crown Jewels of the United Kingdom
- HM Revenue and Customs, which uses the Tudor Crown as its logo
