= Decanter label =

Label hung from decanter to identify contents

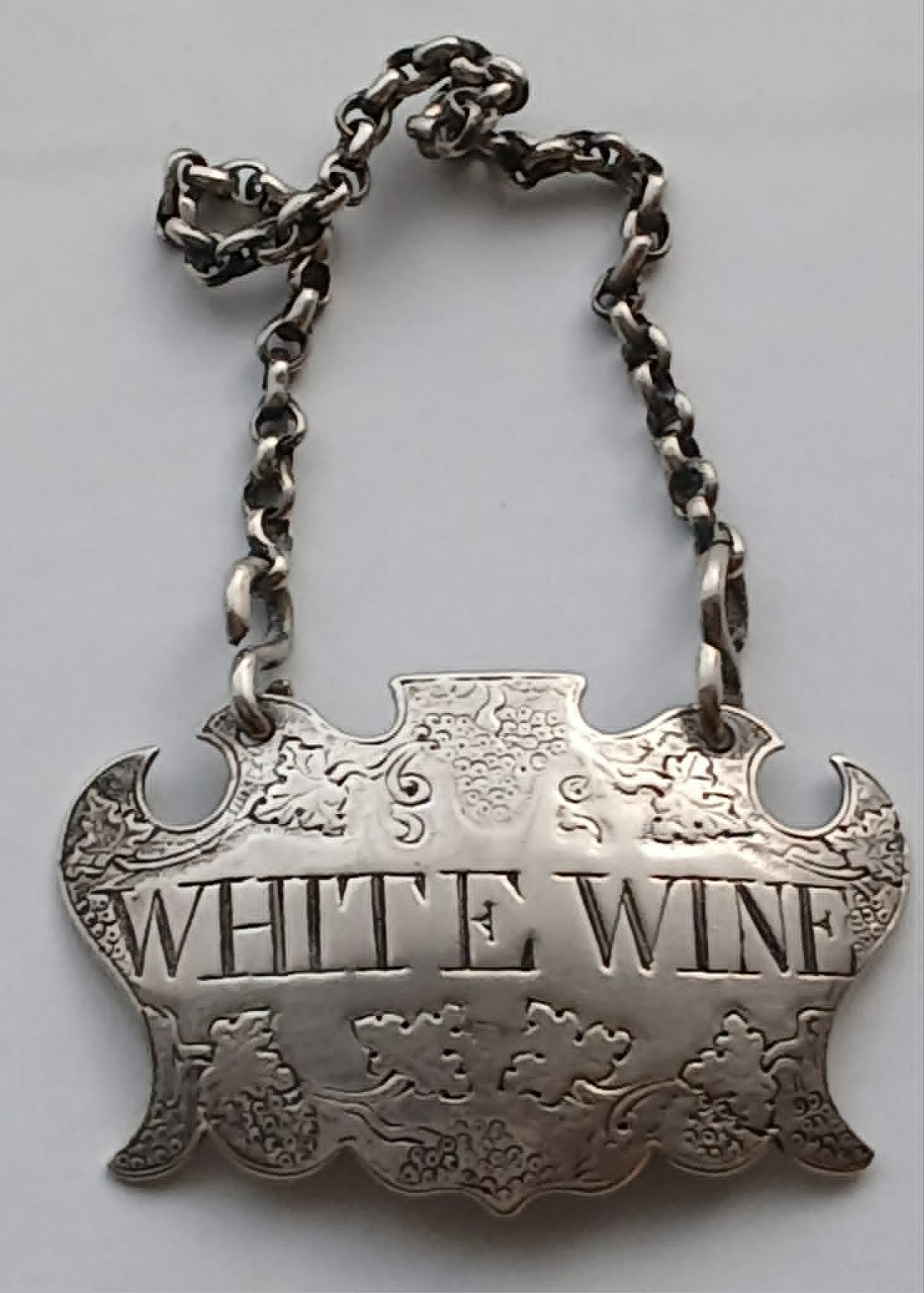
An untypical escutcheon-type decanter label with a flattened top, by James Slater, circa 1739-1750, incised for WHITE WINE.

Decanter labels, also known as wine labels (not to be confused with paper wine labels) or bottle tickets, are small labels made to hang round the necks of decanters or similar containers to identify their contents. The first decanter labels were probably produced in the mid-1730s in England. In addition to silver and silver plate, decanter labels have been made in materials including mother of pearl, enamel, copper-gilt and gold.

== Terminology ==
In their early years there are few references to decanter labels. The ledger of goldsmith George Wickes noted that he charged a customer £1.10d for 'six Bottle Ticketts' in May 1736/37. The will of Jonathan Swift, drafted in 1740, refers to 'enamell'd silver plates for distinguishing bottles of wine'. From the 1790s on, the main terms to refer to the objects are wine label and decanter label. However, bottle ticket is still a term sometimes used.

== Makers, names and designs ==
=== Early makers c.1735-1760 ===
Evidence suggests that the first labels appeared in the mid-1730s in England. One of the first makers, and the most prolific early maker, was Sandilands Drinkwater. Drinkwater was a specialist ‘smallworker’ who also made silver rattles. An early form of label was the escutcheon, a shield-shaped design, which Drinkwater may have been the first to develop. Drinkwater's workshop was based in a premises called the 'Hand and Coral' at Gutter Lane. Being very close to Goldsmith's Hall, this was a popular street for smiths as work could be quickly sent for assay. Other early makers such as John Harvey and James Slater were based nearby. Though it is not known who made the very first silver wine label, research indicates it is likely to have been one of Drinkwater, Harvey or Slater.

=== Names ===
A vast variety of names are found on decanter labels. Whilst most names found on labels are original, they were sometimes obliterated and replaced with other names. This could happen when a particular type of wine fell out of fashion. As of 2004 the Wine Label Circle had counted 2875 names of which 80% were connected with alcoholic drinks. Of the remaining 20% a large proportion are connected with sauces. The final type of name found on labels is for medicinal or boudoir labels.

=== Designs ===
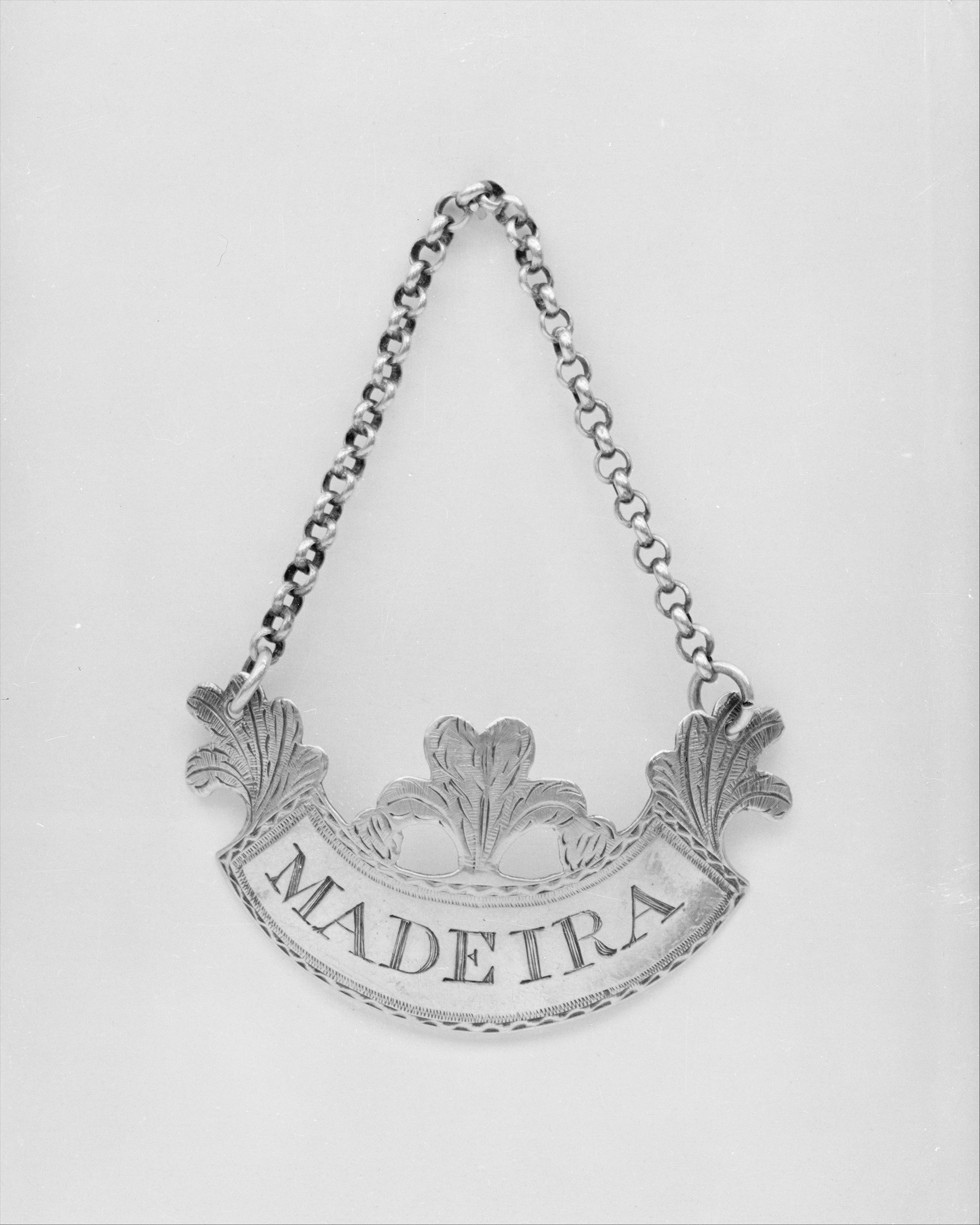
A decanter label for Madeira wine. With the mark of American silversmith Louis Boudo of Boston, but possibly an import from England made by the Bateman family.

The earliest design, the escutcheon, is believed to have been based on handles and key plates on furniture of the Queen Anne and early Georgian period. A number of varieties of escutcheon exist, and labels of this design are generally decorated with chased vine leaves, grapes and tendrils. However, plain examples without any decoration also occur. Whilst the first labels were made from sterling silver, the escutcheon shape is also used in the Battersea enamels and the later enamels. During its initial period of popularity the shape was also used in mother-of-pearl, Pinchbeck, and Old Sheffield Plate. Escutcheon decanter labels were reproduced in later periods, initially perhaps to replace missing labels in sets, or to add the names of new wines.

== Materials and production methods ==
Sterling silver (92.5% silver) is the dominant material in decanter labels. No labels have been discovered from the period of the Britannia standard (95.8%) which ended in 1720, and a very few labels were later made to this standard voluntarily.

From around 1750, and until 1840, labels were also produced in the cheaper material known as Old Sheffield Plate (also called fused plate) , which involved a layer of sterling standard silver being rolled on top of copper and the two materials fusing, creating a sheet metal which appeared to be silver but contained mostly copper. This fused plate was then made into objects by skilled craftsmen. Early Old Sheffield labels may have copper backs, but later the backs were either covered with tin, or plated on both sides. From the 1840s, electroplating replaced Old Sheffield Plate in this role. Electroplated labels are made from a base metal before and plated after manufacture using an electro-chemical process.

Another material is enamel, generally onto a copper surface. One early centre was the short-lived Battersea factory at York House, which operated circa 1753-56. These labels often featured engravings by Simon Francois Ravenet. Shortly thereafter production began at Bilston. Labels can also be found in various other metals such as brass, pewter, silver-gilt, copper-gilt, gold, and in at least two cases, platinum. Exotic materials such as tigers' claws and boars' teeth are also found, generally produced in India in the 19th century.

== Collecting and research ==
=== Collecting ===
As they are small, lightweight, and visually various, decanter labels have long been collected. In 1919 W.A. Young noted that interest was established by this period, calling labels 'popular with collectors of both silver and Sheffield Plate'. Decanter labels are held in various museums around the world. The Victoria and Albert Museum had a collection of around 1700 labels as of 1985, and has over 1500 as digitized records on its website as of 2026. Most of the Victoria and Albert Museum's labels came from a 1944 bequest from P.J Cropper.. They can also appeal to those interested in wine, and Young suggests inquiry into the names on labels as being of social history interest.

=== Research ===
The first book specifically on the subject of decanter labels was a short work published in 1933 by Major Herbert C. Dent. This was followed by a more substantial book by Dr Norman Penzer in 1952, The Book of the Wine Label., which was the general standard reference on the subject for the next half century. In 1966 E.W Whitworth added a volume in the Collector's Pieces series named Wine Labels, which gives a general overview and provides advice for collectors. Jane Stancliffe of the Victoria and Albert Museum wrote Bottle Tickets in 1985, which features images of labels from the Cropper bequest. A dedicated group, the Wine Label Circle, was formed in 1952 by E.J Pratt, and publishes a specialist journal, The Wine Label Circle Journal. The Circle has also published three books on the subject: the major work Wine Labels 1730-2003: A Worldwide History, now the main reference book on the topic, and books on Sauce Labels and Boudoir Labels.

Sauce labels are usually smaller than true decanter labels and were made to identify sauces generally stored in cruets. They have received specific attention such as Professor John Salter's book Sauce Labels but have often been treated as part of the same general subject matter as decanter labels since collecting and research began, as shown by Major Herbert Dent's book. Many early collections, such as the Hollebone Collection, contained labels for wines and sauces.

== Bibliography ==
- Penzer, Norman (1946). The Book of the Wine Label. White Lion.
- Salter, John (2004). Wine labels, 1730 - 2003: a worldwide history. Woodbridge: Antique Collectors' Club. ISBN 1851494596.
- Salter, John (2012). Boudoir Labels. The Wine Label Circle. ISBN 0957252307.
- Salter, John (2002). Sauce labels: 1750 - 1950. Woodbridge: Antique Collectors' Club. ISBN 1851494316.
- Stancliffe, Jane (1985). Bottle Tickets. London: Victoria and Albert Museum.
- Whitworth, E.W. (1966). Wine Labels. Norwich: Jarrold & Sons.
- Young, W. A. (1919). The silver and Sheffield plate collector. London: Herbert Jenkins.
