= David Thomas (jeweller) =

British crown jeweller (1942–2026)

David Vyvyan Thomas MVO (21 July 1942 – 18 January 2026) was the Crown Jeweller for the British monarchy. He worked for the Royal Family from 1991 until his retirement in 2007 as an employee of Garrard & Co. He retained three royal warrants.

== Life and career ==
Thomas was the son of a Swansea chemist. At the age of 17, he joined his first employer Collingwood of Conduit Street as a postboy and jewellery-cleaner.

Prince Charles "engineered" his move to Garrard & Co of Regent Street. Thomas originally worked for a competitor of Garrard's, but the rival company took an interest in Thomas and in 1986 they headhunted him. Prince Charles enjoyed his work so much that he recommended him to the Queen, and he eventually was appointed to take over from former Crown Jeweller Bill Summers.

Thomas designed the wedding rings for Diana Spencer and Prince Charles, and was Diana's personal jeweller until her death. When Thomas retired at the age of 65 in July 2007, Garrard was replaced as the Royal Jeweller, after having the role since 1843. Thomas had held the Monarch's personal Royal warrant for the position since 1991. Contrary to reports, Garrard noted that Thomas was not retiring from the company until 2010.

In 2017, Thomas worked for Cleave and Company. That year, he was commissioned through the company to make Meghan Markle's engagement ring. It sourced a diamond from Botswana and several smaller diamonds that had belonged to Princess Diana.

Thomas died from complications of Alzheimer's disease on 18 January 2026, at the age of 83.

== Awards ==
Thomas was appointed a Member of the Royal Victorian Order (MVO) in the 2007 Birthday Honours.
