= G. Collins and Sons =

English jewellery firm

Coordinates: 51°7′40″N 0°15′39″E

G. Collins & Sons Limited
- Type: Private company
- Industry: Jewellery
- Headquarters: Royal Tunbridge Wells, Kent, England
- Key people: Harry Collins; Member of the Royal Victorian Order
- Website: www.gcollinsandsons.com

G. Collins & Sons Limited is a jewellery firm at 76/78 High St, Royal Tunbridge Wells in South East England.

== Background ==
Queen Elizabeth II appointed Harry Collins as her personal jeweller in 2000. He was appointed Member of the Royal Victorian Order (MVO) in 2016.

From 2007 to 2012, Harry Collins was also the Crown Jeweller, succeeding Garrard & Co in charge of the maintenance of the Crown Jewels of the United Kingdom.

In 2012, Harry Collins was responsible for the recreation of Henry VIII's crown, which is on public display at Hampton Court Palace.

== See also ==
- Hamilton & Inches
- Warren James Jewellers
