= George Wickes =

English goldsmith (1698–1761)

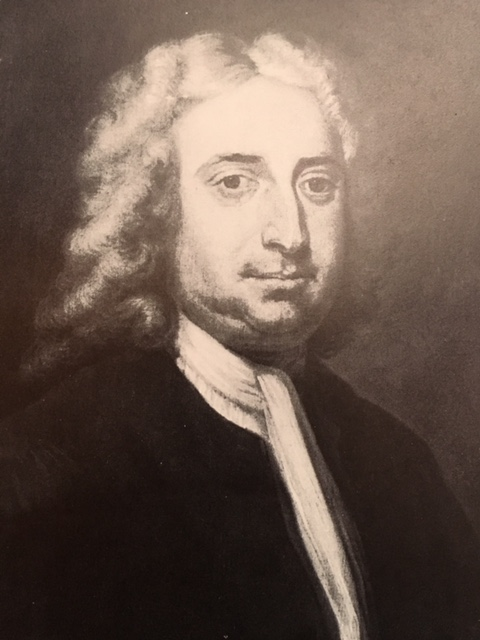
- Born: Bury St Edmunds, England
- Baptised: 7 July 1698
- Died: 31 August 1761; Thurston, Suffolk, England
- Occupations: Goldsmith; Silversmith
- Known for: Founder of Garrard & Co
- Spouse: Alder Phelpes Wickes

George Wickes (baptised 7 July 1698 – 31 August 1761) was an English silversmith who in 1735 founded the company that was to become Garrard & Co.

== Biography ==
George Wickes was born in Bury St Edmunds, England on 7 July 1698, the eighth of ten children born to James and Dorothy Burton Wickes. His father was an upholder or upholsterer by trade. In December 1712, Wickes was apprenticed for seven years to Samuel Wastell, who worked in the Britannia standard of silver (958 parts per 1,000) set into place by Parliament on 25 March 1697.

He registered his first marks in London in 1721–22 with an address of Threadneedle Street in the City of London. In 1730, Wickes entered into a partnership with John Craig and moved to Norris Street. It was during this period that he began royal commissions and was appointed Goldsmith to Frederick, Prince of Wales, the heir apparent to the British throne. By 1735, he had become independent again and moved to King's Arms, Panton Street. This was the beginning of successful business that would later become known as Garrard & Co.

Business records indicate that Wickes employed a number of individuals including Edward Wakelin. In 1750, Wickes took his former apprentice, Samuel Netherton (1723-1803) as his partner. In 1760, Wickes retired and his business was taken over by another apprentice, John Parker.

== Legacy ==
The business that Wickes had built up later became Garrard & Co. In 1952, Garrard & Co was acquired by the Goldsmiths’ and Silversmiths’ Company of Regents Street. The Garrard & Co location on Albemarle Street held an auction sale for the fittings, furniture and books. The Albemarle location was only the company's second location since 1735, having moved from the original Panton Street location in 1911. It was during this auction viewing that Norman Penzer, an expert of Paul Storr, stumbled across the Garrard & Co ledgers going back to George Wickes and the founding of the firm in 1735. Penzer along with Arthur Grimwade, Reginald Eyles and John Hayward reacted quickly to save the volumes from being destroyed. Although the acquiring firm eventually decided to keep the newer Victorian-era ledgers with confidential royal accounts, the Wickes-Wakelin-Garrard ledgers were preserved for posterity. The volumes contained a wealth of information and contributed greatly to the study of 18th-century English silver. As a result, Wickes was proven to be a leading royal goldsmith like Paul de Lamerie and Paul Storr.
