= Crown Jeweller =

Position in the British Royal Household

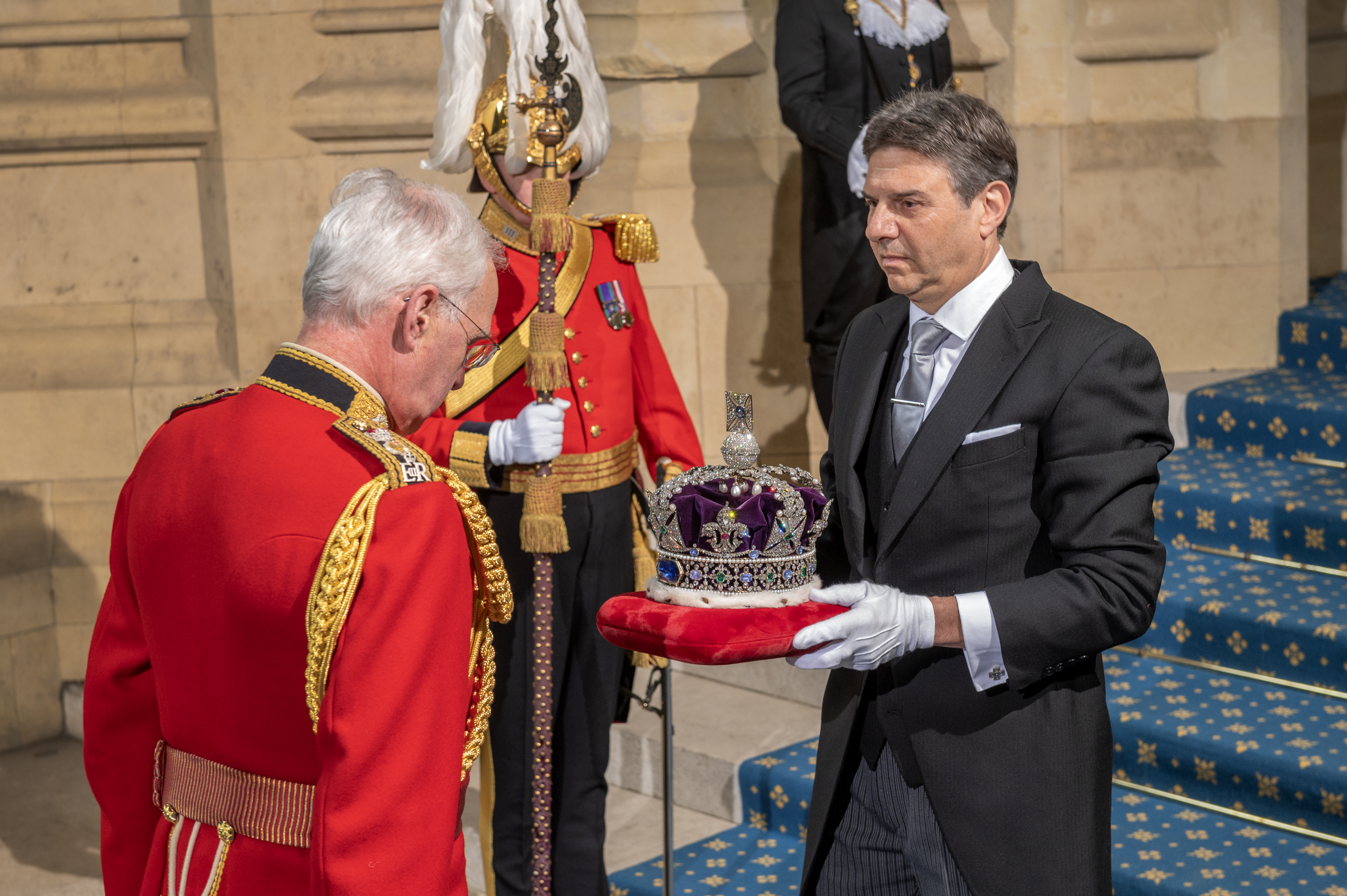
The Crown Jeweller (Mark Appleby) holding the Imperial State Crown at the 2022 State Opening of Parliament

The Crown Jeweller is responsible for the maintenance of the Crown Jewels of the United Kingdom, and is appointed by the British monarch. The current Crown Jeweller is Mark Appleby, who was appointed in 2017.

== History ==
The post was created in 1843 by Queen Victoria, who issued a royal warrant to Garrard & Co., and the title of Crown Jeweller was vested in an employee of the company. Until then, Rundell & Bridge, who advertised themselves as Crown jewellers, had been responsible for maintaining and preparing Jewels for use at state occasions. If the title had existed before 1843, it would have applied to William Jones of Jefferys & Jones (1782–96), Philip Gilbert of Jefferys, Jones & Gilbert (1797–1820), and Rundell & Bridge (1821–43). Before 1782, the work of repairing and making the Crown Jewels was distributed to various goldsmiths and jewellers on an ad-hoc basis.

David V. Thomas (1991–2007) stated that he had been always on call, ready to attend to the Jewels. William Summers, the sixth Crown Jeweller (1962–91), said of his job: "Where the Crown goes, there go I".

In 2007, Garrard & Co. were replaced, the reason given that it was time for a change. The company had been acquired by a private equity firm in 2006. Harry Collins of the family business G. Collins & Sons, who was also Queen Elizabeth II's personal jeweller, was appointed the new Crown Jeweller. In 2012, Collins stepped down from the role and Martin Swift of Mappin & Webb became the Crown Jeweller. In 2017 he was replaced by Mark Appleby, the head of Mappin & Webb's jewellery workshop.

== List of Crown Jewellers ==
- 1843: Sebastian Garrard (Note: Sebastian Garrard died in November 1870 aged 72.)
- George Whitford (Note: Shirley Bury notes that Whitford "began to attend to [Queen Victoria's] requirements in the early years of her widowhood". Prince Albert died in 1861.)
- Henry Bell
- C. E. Newbigin
- 1910: Cecil Mann
- 1962: William Summers
- 1991: David V. Thomas
- 2007: Harry Collins
- 2012: Martin Swift
- 2017: Mark Appleby

== See also ==
- Keeper of the Jewel House
