= Garrard & Co =

British jewellery company

Coordinates: 51°30′36″N 0°08′35″W

Garrard & Co. Limited
- Type: Private
- Industry: Jewellery
- Founded: London (1722)
- Founder: George Wickes
- Headquarters: London, United Kingdom
- Website: www.garrard.com

Garrard & Co. Limited is a British luxury jewelry company. George Wickes founded Garrard in London in 1735 and the brand is headquartered at Albemarle Street in Mayfair, London. Garrard also has a presence in a number of other locations globally. Garrard was the first official and most notably important Crown Jeweller of the United Kingdom having supplied jewels for Queen Victoria, and was charged with the upkeep of the British Crown Jewels, from 1843 to 2007, and was responsible for the creation of many tiaras and jewels still worn by the British royal family today. As well as jewellery, Garrard is known for having created some of the world's most illustrious sporting trophies, including the America's Cup, the ICC Cricket World Cup Trophy and a number of trophies for Royal Ascot in its role as Official Trophies and Silverware Supplier, which originally dates back to the first Gold Cup in 1842.

== History ==
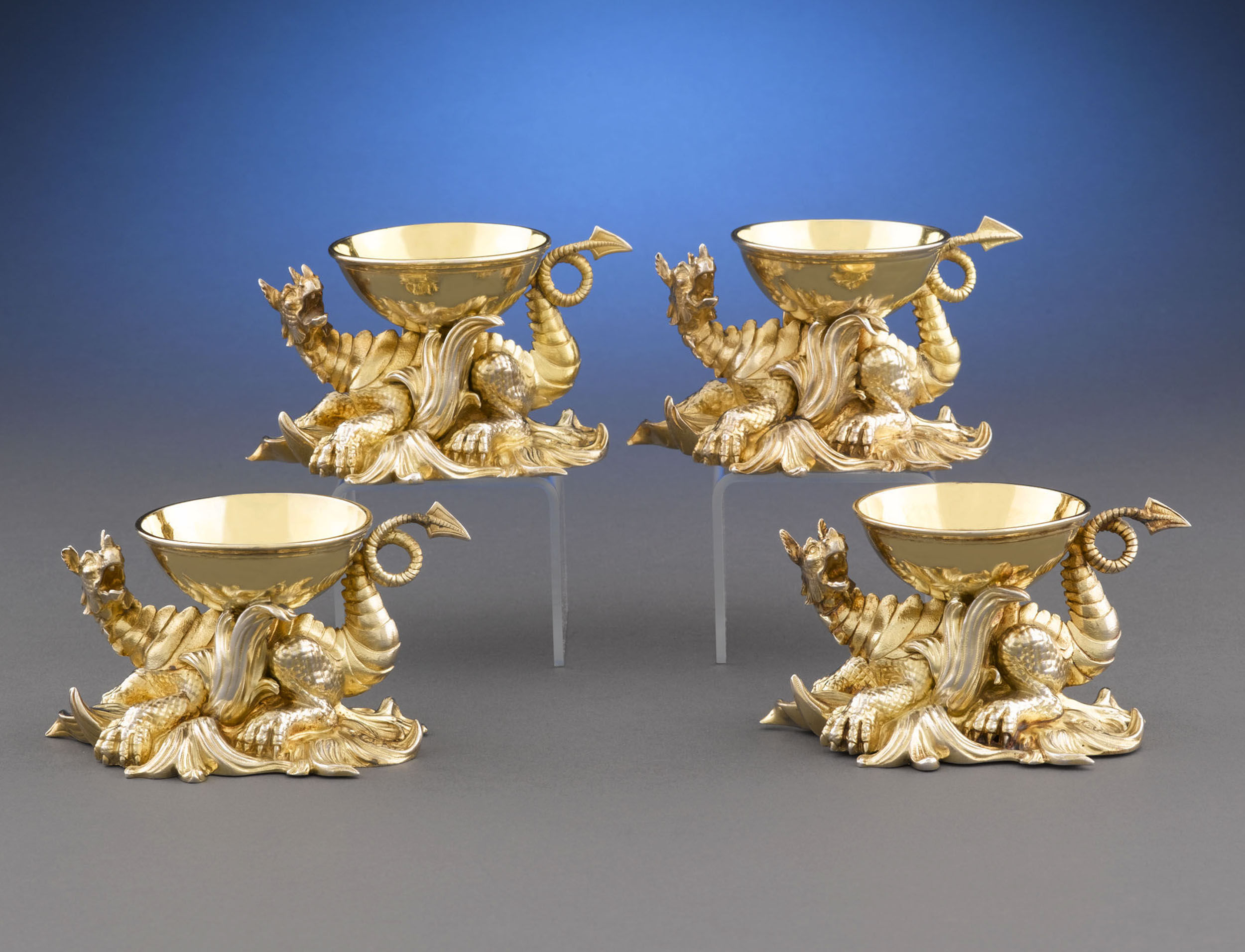
Victorian Silver-Gilt Salt Cellars by R. & S. Garrard. Hallmarked London, 1844

The company that was to become Garrard was founded by George Wickes (1698–1761), who entered his mark in Goldsmiths' Hall in 1722. Wickes set up business in Threadneedle Street in the City of London in 1722; the company moved to Panton Street off Haymarket in central London in 1735 as a goldsmith and provider of jewellery and other luxury items to aristocratic patrons. Wickes was an accomplished silversmith known for his work in the rococo style, and gained the patronage of Frederick, Prince of Wales. Two apprentices of Wickes, John Parker and Edward Wakelin, purchased the company following Wickes' retirement in 1760, replaced by John Wakelin and William Taylor in 1776. Following the death of Taylor, Robert Garrard became a partner in the company in 1792. Garrard took sole control of the firm in 1802, with his sons Robert Garrard II, James and Sebastian succeeding him in running the company, trading as R., J., & S. Garrard (or Robert Garrard & Brothers) until James' retirement in 1835, when the company became R & S Garrard. The company remained in the hands of the Garrard family until the death of Sebastian Henry Garrard, great-grandson of Robert Garrard senior, in 1946. The name Garrard & Company Ltd was registered in 1909, and the company moved to new premises in Albemarle Street in central London in 1911.

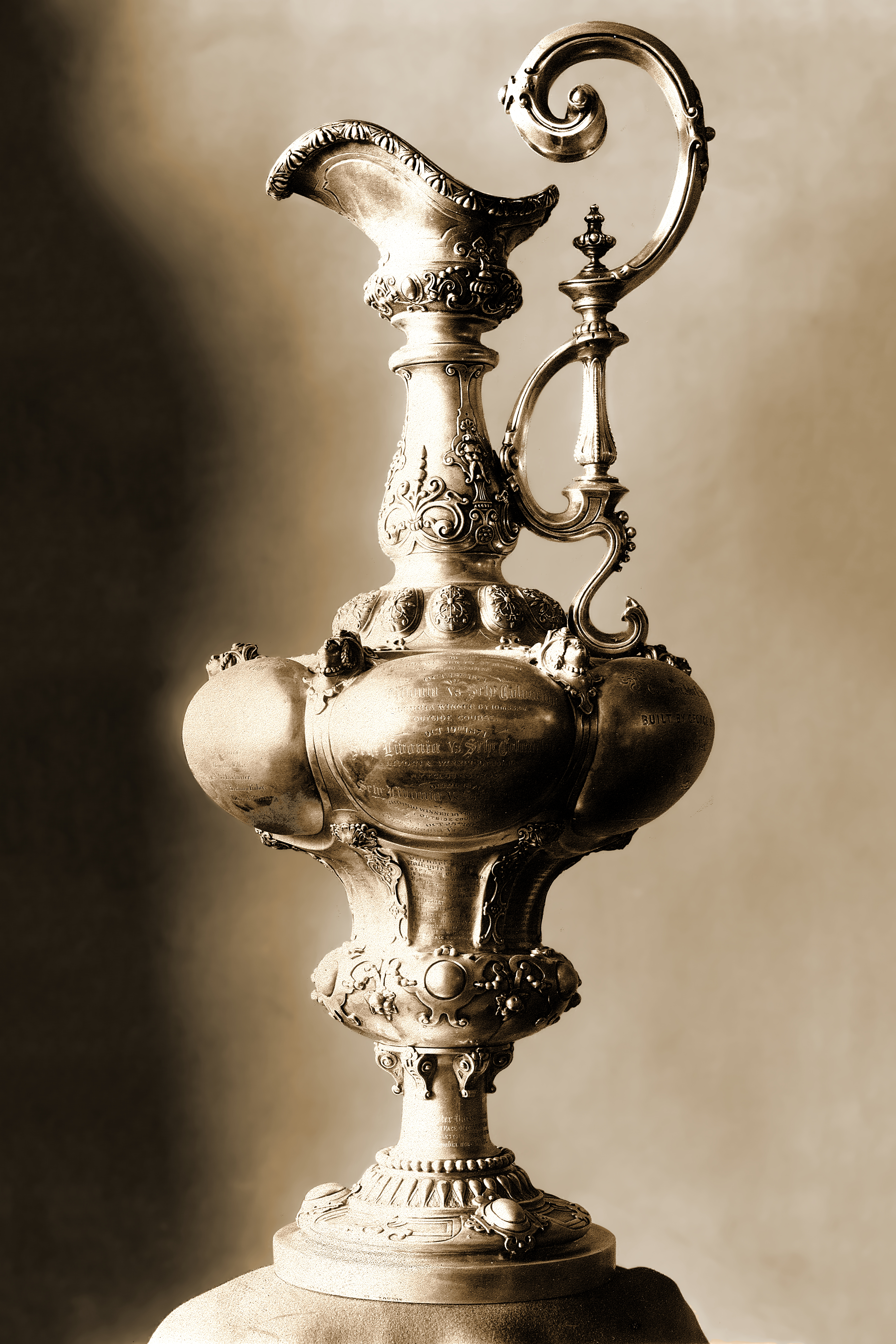
The America's Cup in neo-Mannerist style, 1848

In 1843, Queen Victoria appointed Garrard as the first ever official Crown Jewellers, leading to the production of numerous pieces of silverware and jewellery for the royal family, as well as the upkeep of the Crown Jewels. The company has dealt with a number of famous jewels, such as the Cullinan diamonds (including Cullinan I, "The Great Star of Africa"), and created such pieces as the Imperial Crown of India in 1911, the crown of Queen Mary for her coronation, and the Crown of Queen Elizabeth in 1937. In 1852, Garrard were given the responsibility of re-cutting the famous Koh-i-Noor diamond into a brilliant.

In 1848, Garrard produced what is now referred to as the America's Cup, the oldest international sporting trophy. The Cup is an ornate sterling silver bottomless ewer originally awarded in 1851 by the Royal Yacht Squadron for a yacht race around the Isle of Wight in England, which was won by the schooner America. The trophy was renamed the 'America's Cup' after the yacht and was donated to the New York Yacht Club under the terms of the Deed of Gift, which made the cup available for perpetual international competition.

Garrard amalgamated with The Goldsmiths and Silversmiths Company in 1952, when they closed their Albemarle workshops and moved premises to Regent Street. In October 1959, Mappin & Webb, a subsidiary of Sears Holdings, bought Garrard.

In July 1990, Sears sold Mappin & Webb and Garrard to fellow jeweller, Asprey plc, retaining an 38.5% interest in the expanded group. In 1998, Asprey plc was renamed Asprey & Garrard and moved from 112 Regent Street to premises on New Bond Street. The company demerged in 2002, with Garrard returning to the Albemarle Street site it first occupied in 1911. Garrard was acquired by the US private equity firm Yucaipa Companies in 2006, ending its partnership with Asprey.

Jade Jagger was the creative director for the company from 2001 until being replaced by Stephen Webster in 2006. In 2012, Sara Prentice was appointed creative director of the brand.

=== Royal warrant ===
In 2007, Garrard & Co's services as crown jeweller were no longer required, with the reason cited being that it was simply 'time for a change'. This ended over 160 years of Garrard's tenure as the inaugural British Royal Jeweller, although Garrard still holds a royal warrant from Charles III while he was Prince of Wales.

== Notable creations ==
More recently, Garrard made the sapphire engagement ring given by Charles, Prince of Wales, to Lady Diana Spencer for their 1981 engagement.

In 2011, the ring returned to the public eye as the engagement ring Prince William gave to his fiancée Catherine Middleton. The distinctive cluster setting of this ring has become a signature of the House, and is still seen in the designs of the 1735 collection today.

Garrard has created many other jewels that are worn by the British royal family, including the Girls of Great Britain and Ireland tiara which Queen Elizabeth II is seen wearing in the portrait featured on British currency. The Queen Mary Diamond Bandeau Tiara worn by Meghan Markle on the occasion of her marriage to Prince Harry was created during Garrard's time as crown jeweller.

Garrard created the Premier League trophy and the Cricket World Cup Trophy. They also produced the original cubic zirconia prop-necklace of the Heart of the Ocean for the 1997 film Titanic, as well as a similar necklace made with a sapphire and white diamonds which was worn by Celine Dion at the Oscars and later auctioned. In 2018, the House of Garrard unveiled a 118.88 ct royal blue Burmese sapphire presented in a brooch that features a signature cluster setting. The jewel was named in honour of the Sapphire Jubilee of Elizabeth II, a date traditionally marked by the gift of a sapphire, and pays tribute to the House's role in remodelling the Imperial State Crown for the occasion.

Garrard is the manufacturer of the Staff of office used by the Usher of the Black Rod of the Parliament of Canada.
