= Imperial crown (disambiguation) =

An imperial crown is a crown worn by an emperor.

Imperial crown may refer to:

== Crowns ==
- The Tudor Crown, formally called the Imperial Crown
- The Imperial State Crown, the present state crown of the United Kingdom
- The Imperial Crown of India
- The Imperial Crown of Russia
- The Imperial Crown of Austria
- The Imperial Crown of the Holy Roman Empire
- The Imperial Crown of Mexico
- The Imperial Crown of Brazil

== Concepts ==
- The Crown, a political concept used in Commonwealth realms and defined as an imperial crown under the Ecclesiastical Appeals Act 1532

== Other ==
- Imperial Crown, a line of luxury motor vehicles manufactured under the Chrysler Imperial brand between 1940 and 1954 and by the standalone Imperial brand from 1955
- Imperial Crown Style, a style of Japanese architecture

== See also ==
- Crown Imperial
