= Crown Imperial =

Crown Imperial can be:

- Chrysler Crown Imperial, a model of Chrysler Imperial automobile
- Crown Imperial, a model of Imperial automobile
- Crown Imperial (march), a musical composition by Sir William Walton
- Fritillaria imperialis (Kaiser's Crown), a plant

== See also ==
- Imperial crown (disambiguation)
