= Imperial crown =

Crown used at emperors' coronations

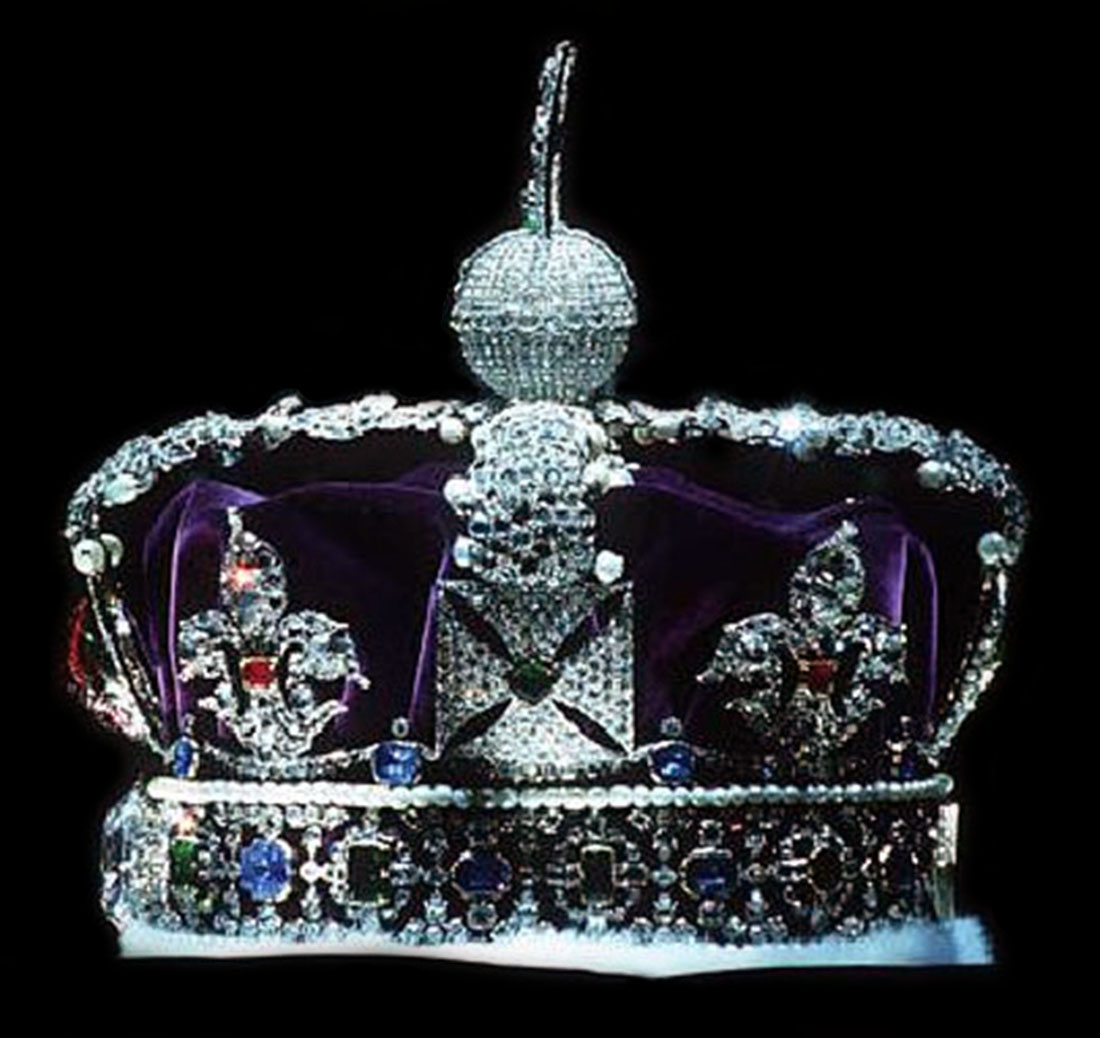
The British Imperial State Crown viewed from the side with the front facing left (the Black Prince's Ruby, and the Cullinan II are just visible in profile).

An imperial crown is a crown worn by an emperor. In the European cultural area, it also symbolizes the power of the empire in heraldic depictions. The craftsmanship corresponded to the king's crown, with precious stones and pearls set into the precious metal frame for decoration. Their external form differed from crowns of the same period and the same reign. The use of Christian symbols to emphasize the divine rule of the emperor is the reason for the deviation.

In East Asia, there are several types of crowns worn by emperors, depending on the ritual or ceremony. Typical examples are the Chinese mianguan and the Japanese benkan. In external form, they are characterized by chains that hide the emperor's face.

== Design ==
Crowns in Europe during the Middle Ages varied in design:

An open crown is one which consists basically of a golden circlet elaborately worked and decorated with precious stones or enamels. ... The medieval French crown was of this type. ... the closed crown, which had bands of metal crossing usually from one side to the other and from back to front so that they met in the middle, at the top of the head. ... These arches are in part utilitarian, since they serve to strengthen the crown, in part decorative, since they are normally made to serve as supports for a central cross or jewel, and in part traditional, since a contributing element to the evolution of many medieval crowns was the structure of the early Germanic helmet, which had metal bands crossing at the top of the head to protect the skull from injury.

A special case of a closed crown was that of the Holy Roman Empire. This was originally an open crown, made up of eight separate richly jewelled sections incorporating four magnificent enamelled plaques, but the Emperor Conrad II (1024–39) had added to it a kind of jewelled crest, running from front to back, to which he had thoughtfully attached his name, CHVONRADVS DEI GRATIA ROMANORV(M) IMPERATOR AVG(VSTVS). This jewelled crest was so closely associated with the notion of the imperial office that when the Habsburgs made a new imperial crown in the 15th century in which they incorporated two large cusps resembling a mitre seen sideways, they provided it with a similar crest running from front to back and topped with a central jewel. ... Strictly speaking, therefore, the only type of crown whose characteristics can properly be regarded as imperial was one with a single crest running from front to back. In practice, in countries unfamiliar with closed crowns at all, any kind of closed crown was assumed to be imperial in character.

— Philip Grierson

During the Middle Ages the crowns worn by English kings had been described as both closed (or arched) and open designs. This was in contrast with kings of France who always wore an open crown. However, there is academic debate on how often closed crowns were used in England during this period, as the first unequivocal use of the closed crown was by Henry IV of England at his coronation on 13 October 1399. However his effigy on his tomb in Canterbury Cathedral wears an open crown, so the link in England between the style of the crown and its representation as that worn by a king and an emperor was not established. The use of a closed crown may have been adopted by the English as a way of distinguishing the English crown from the French crown, but it also had other meanings to some. For example, Henry V of England wore a helmet-crown of the arched type at the Battle of Agincourt which the French knight St. Remy commented was "like the imperial crown".

The association of the closed crown with imperial crowns was already established in Continental Europe by the late 14th century, for example the florins minted for Charles IV, Holy Roman Emperor) sometimes show him with a closed crown (though on the commoner variety, the crown is open). A miniature picture in the Chronica Aulae Regiae written in the great abbey outside Prague depicts his mother Elizabeth, a queen of Bohemia, wearing an open crown, while his two wives, who had imperial titles, have closed ones.

During the machinations that surrounded the introduction of the imperial crown under Henry VIII (see the section below Legal usage), the closed crown, became associated as a symbolic representation of the English Crown as an imperial crown, (Note: Henry changed his coinage and his Great Seal from depicting himself with an open crown to a closed one to depict the imperial nature of the English Crown.) (Note: Shortly before Henry VIII of England started his breach with the Roman Catholic Church, Maximilian I, Holy Roman Emperor, as regent for his son Philip the Handsome, had the real d'or coin struck depicting a closed crown, which due to the close trading links between the Low Countries and England would have made the imagery familiar to English men involved in trade and this may have influenced Henry's choice of a difference style of crown.) and has remained so until this day.

== Types of imperial crowns ==
=== Roman imperial crowns ===
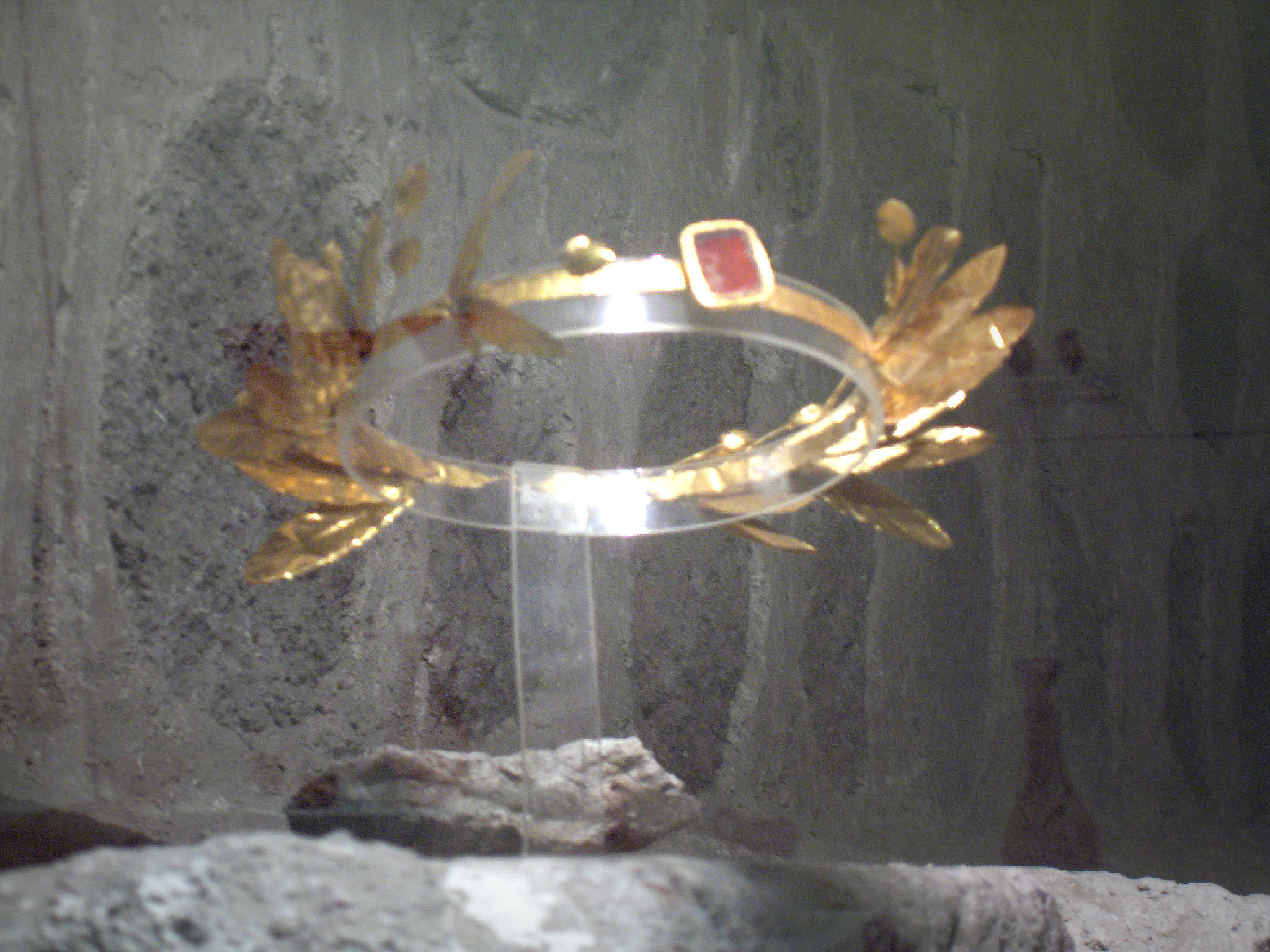
A mixed type between Diadem and laurel wreath from Anatolia

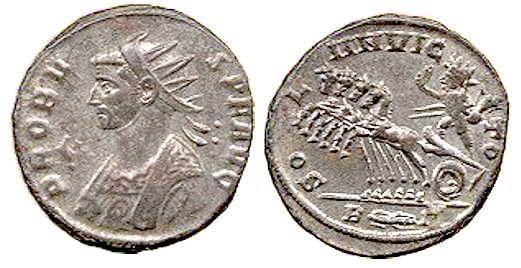
Depiction of the corona radiata or "radiant crown" associated with the cult of Sol Invictus (late 3rd century; Marcus Aurelius Probus).

=== Byzantine imperial crowns ===
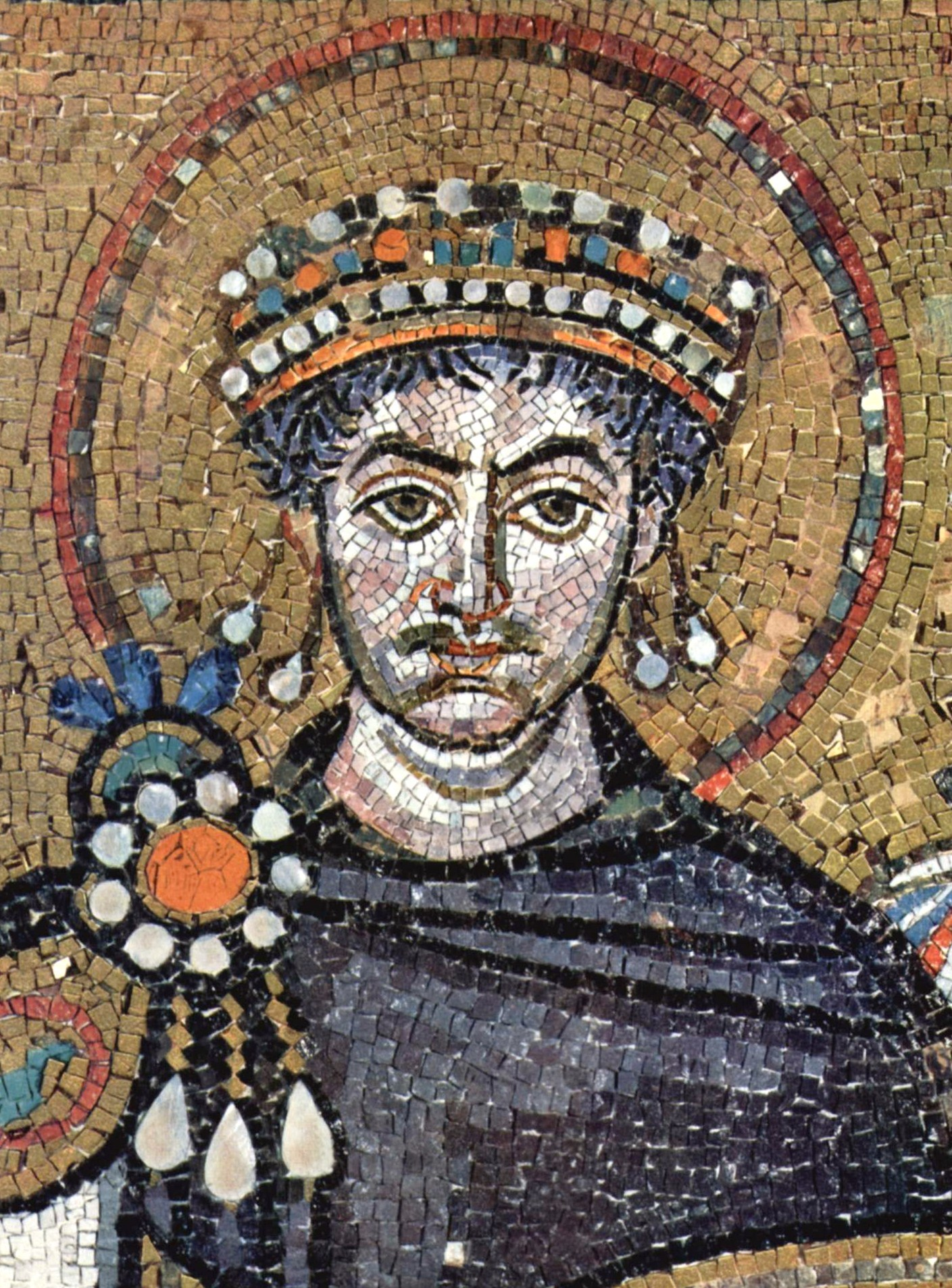
Emperor Justinian with a stemma

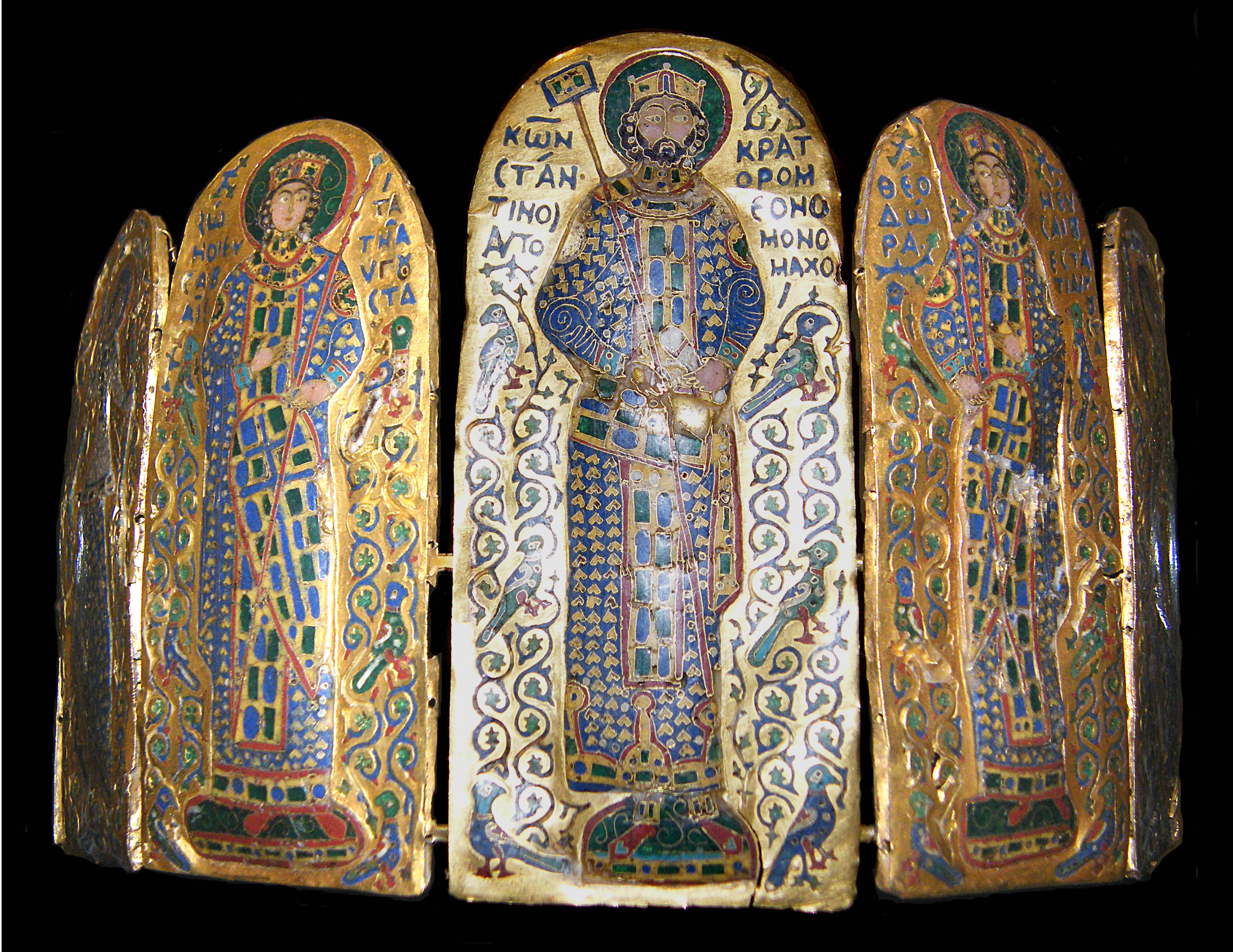
Crown of Constantine IX.

=== Imperial crowns with mitre ===
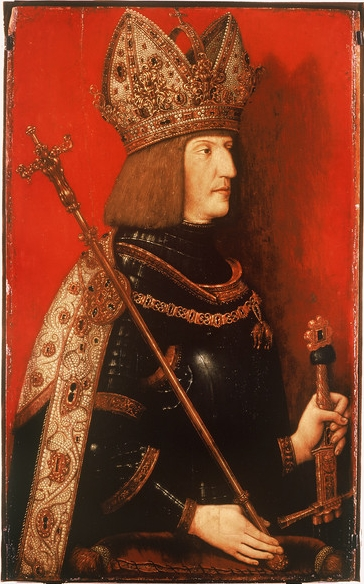
Emperor Maximilian I wearing a crown with mitre

==== Imperial crowns with single arch and deployable mitre ====
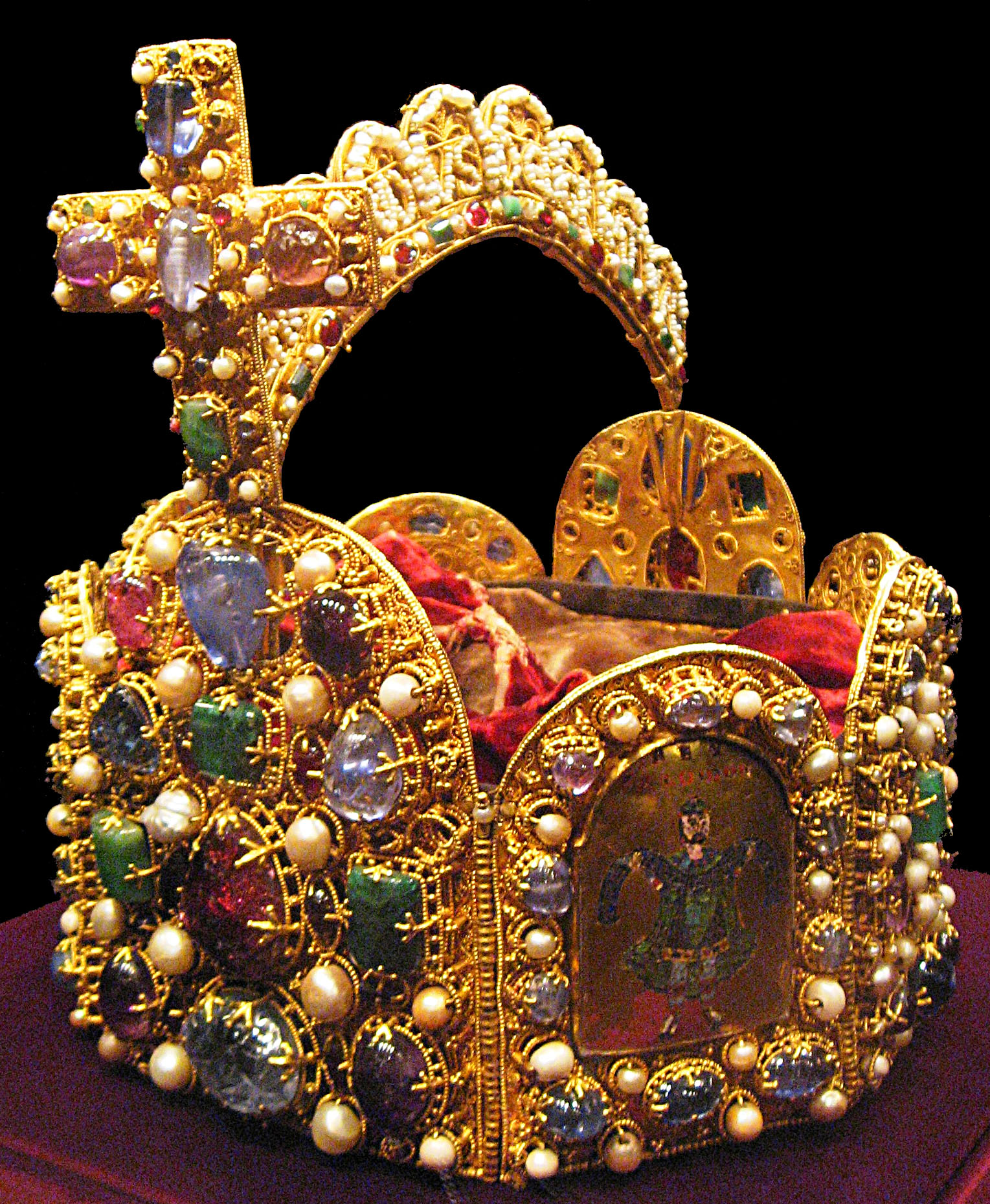
Imperial Crown of the Holy Roman Empire - coronation crown of Holy Roman Emperors-elect, the German Kings.

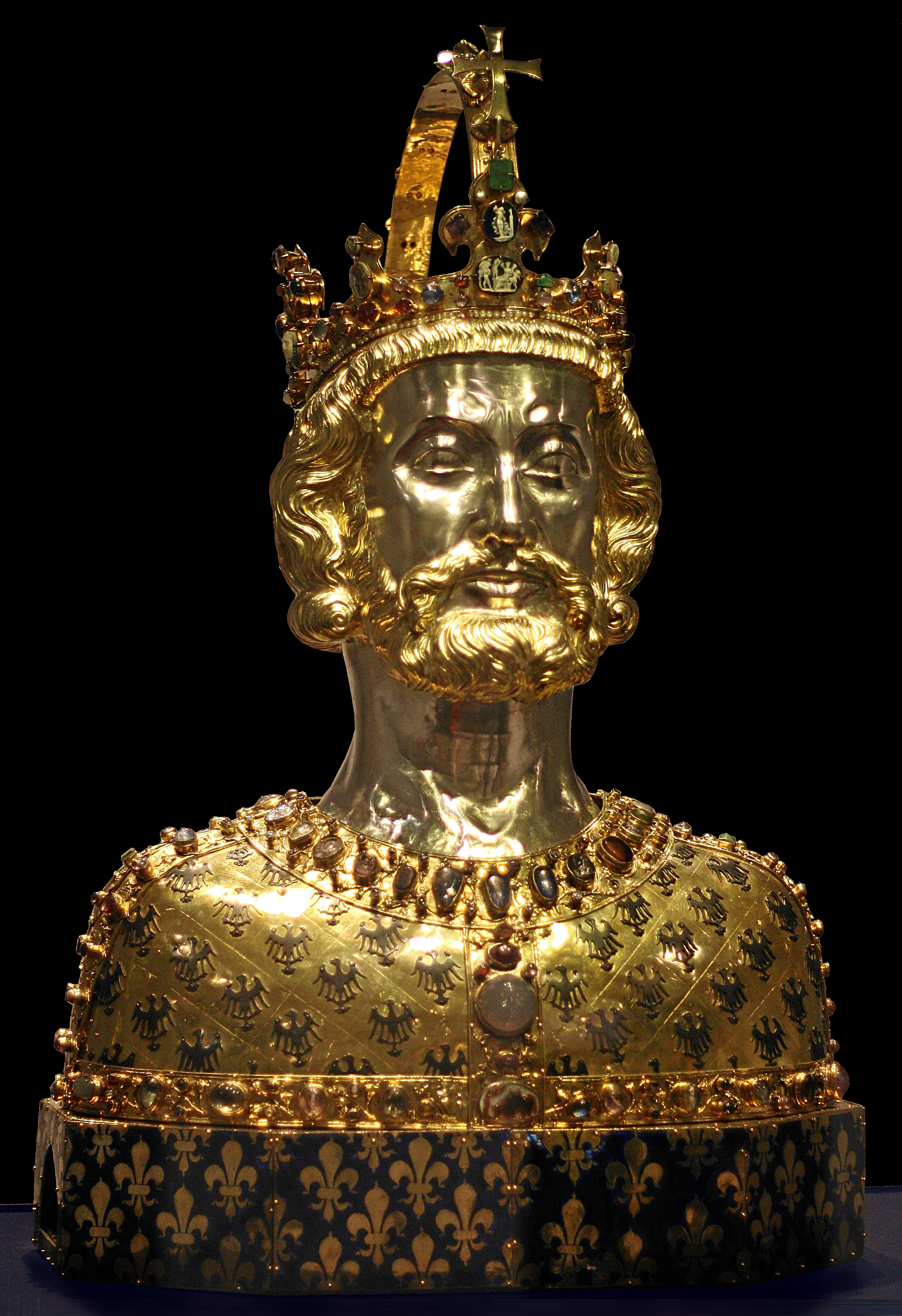
Imperial crown on the head of the Charlemagne reliquary in Aachen

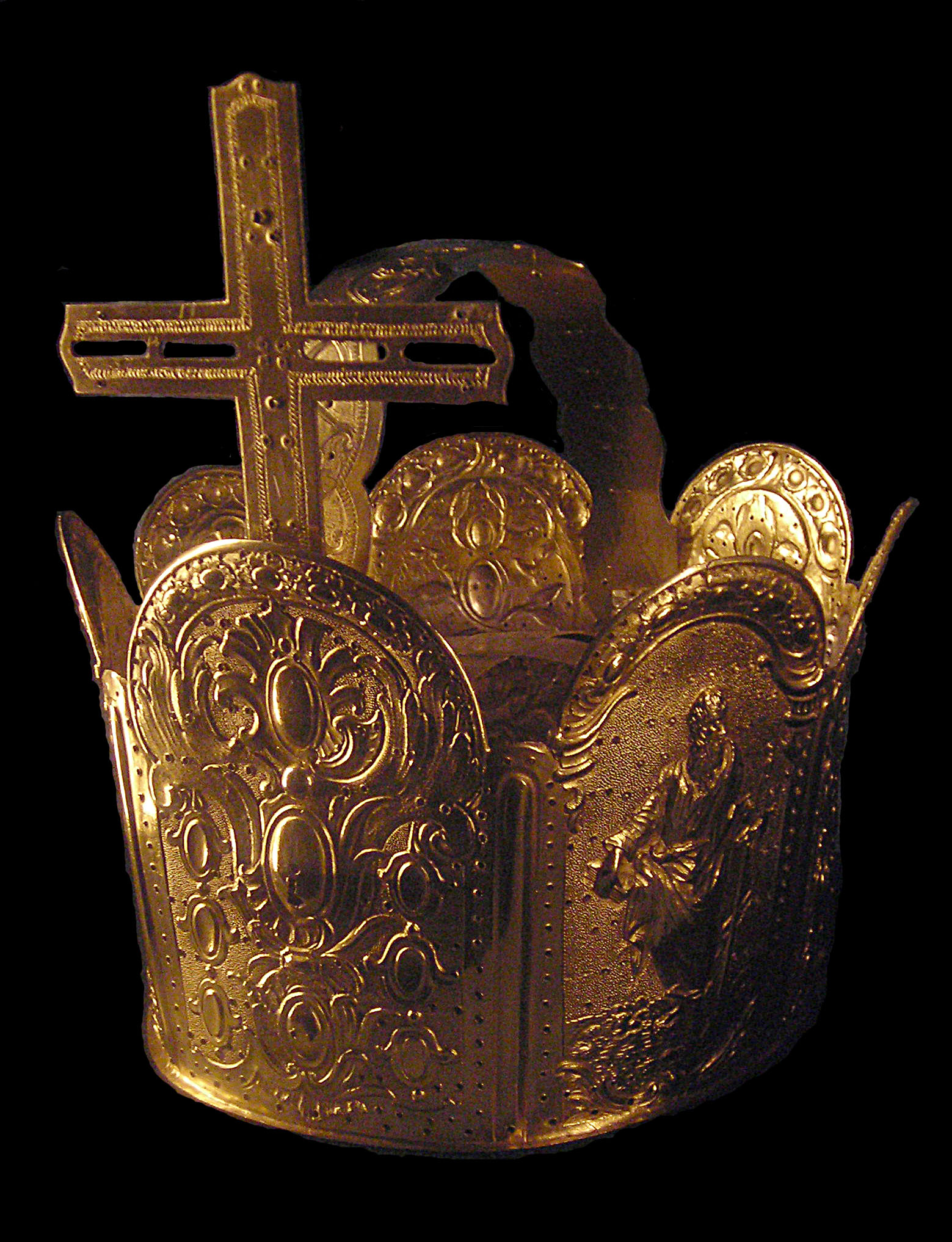
The larger of the Imperial Crowns of Charles VII, made in Augsburg

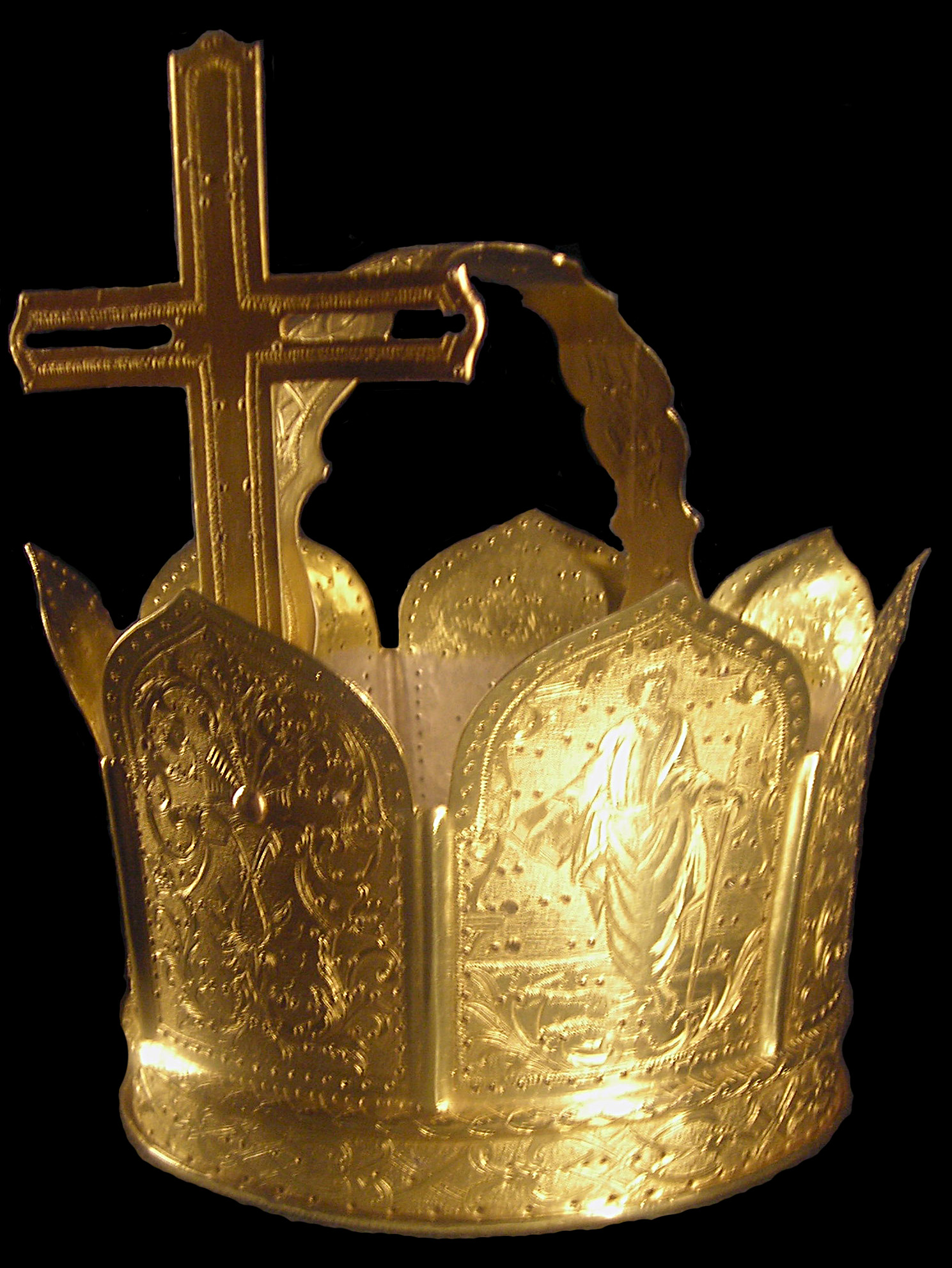
The smaller of the Imperial Crowns of Charles VII, made in Frankfurt

==== Imperial crowns with single arch and attached mitre ====
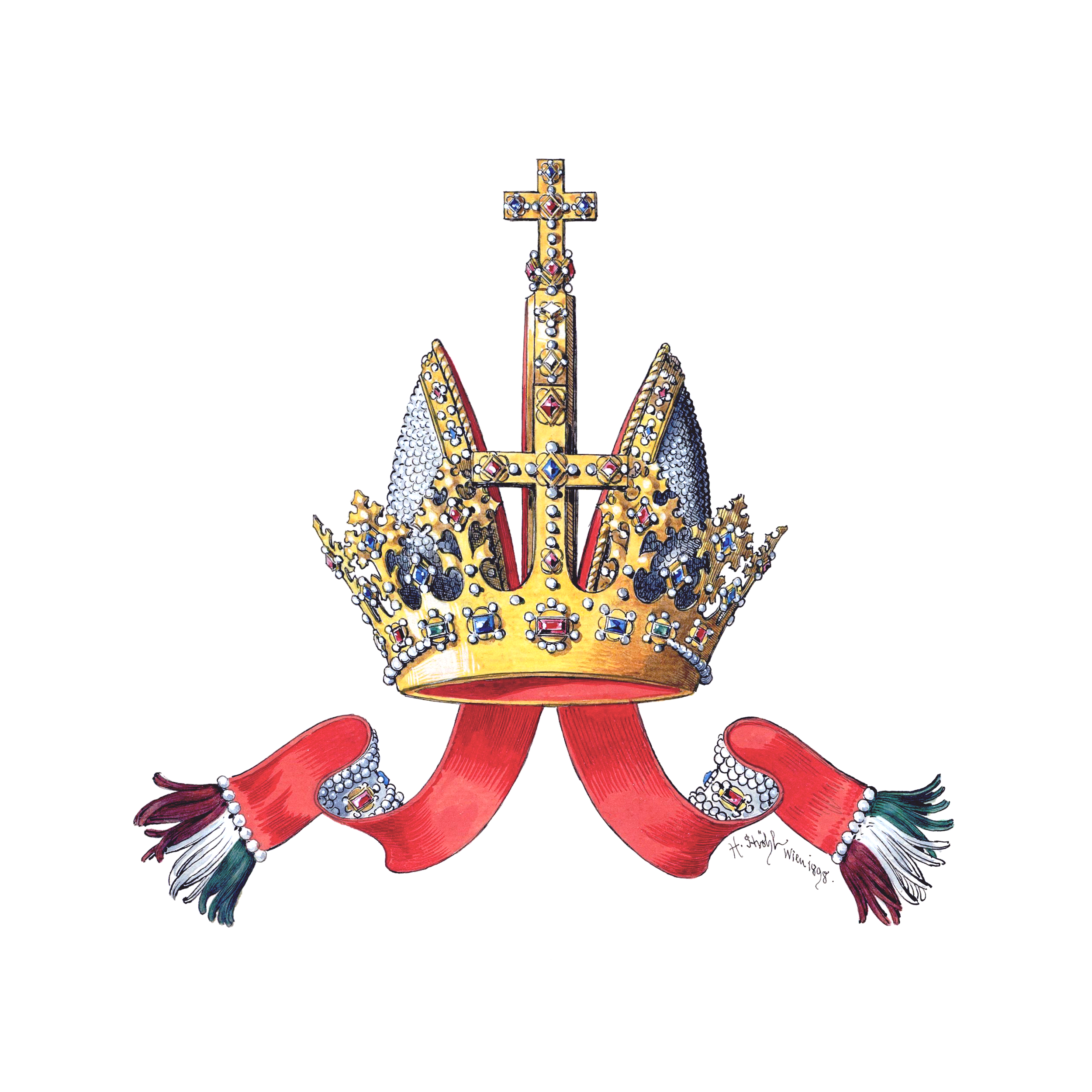
Personal Crown of Holy Roman Emperor Frederick III depicted on his tomb.

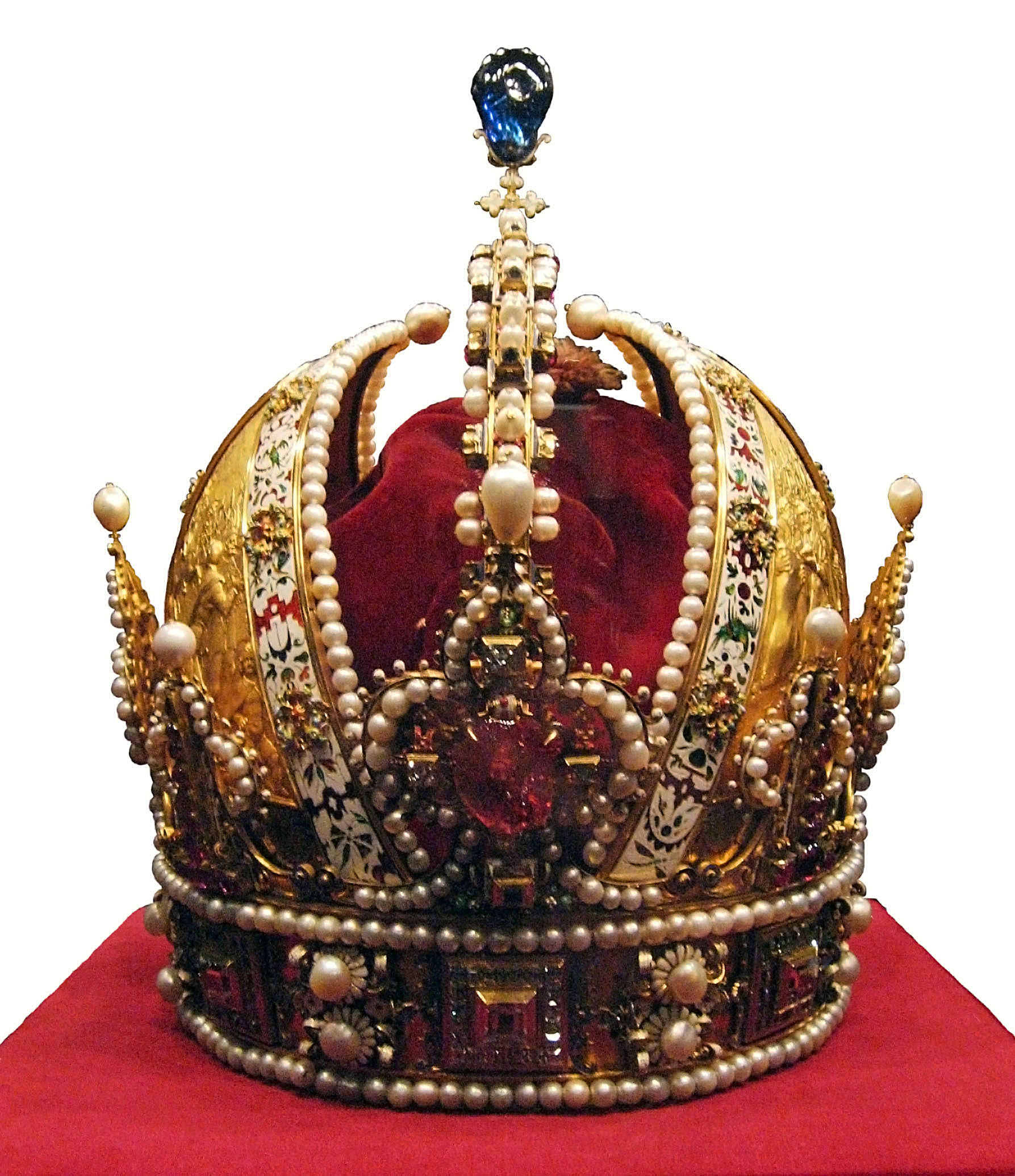
Personal Imperial Crown made for Holy Roman Emperor Rudolf II, later Imperial Crown of Austria.

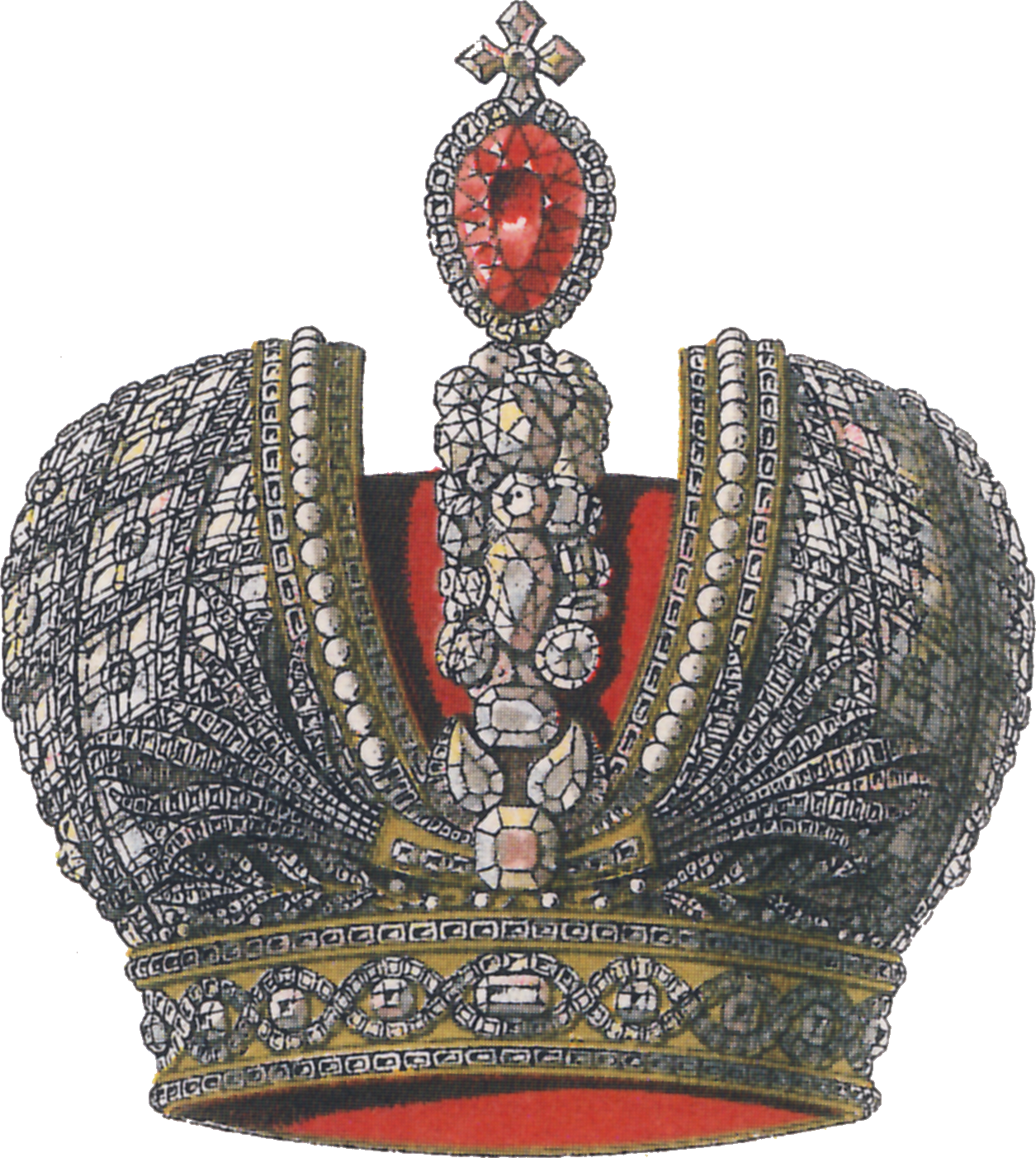
Imperial Crown of Russia — coronation crown of the Russian Tsars/Emperors.

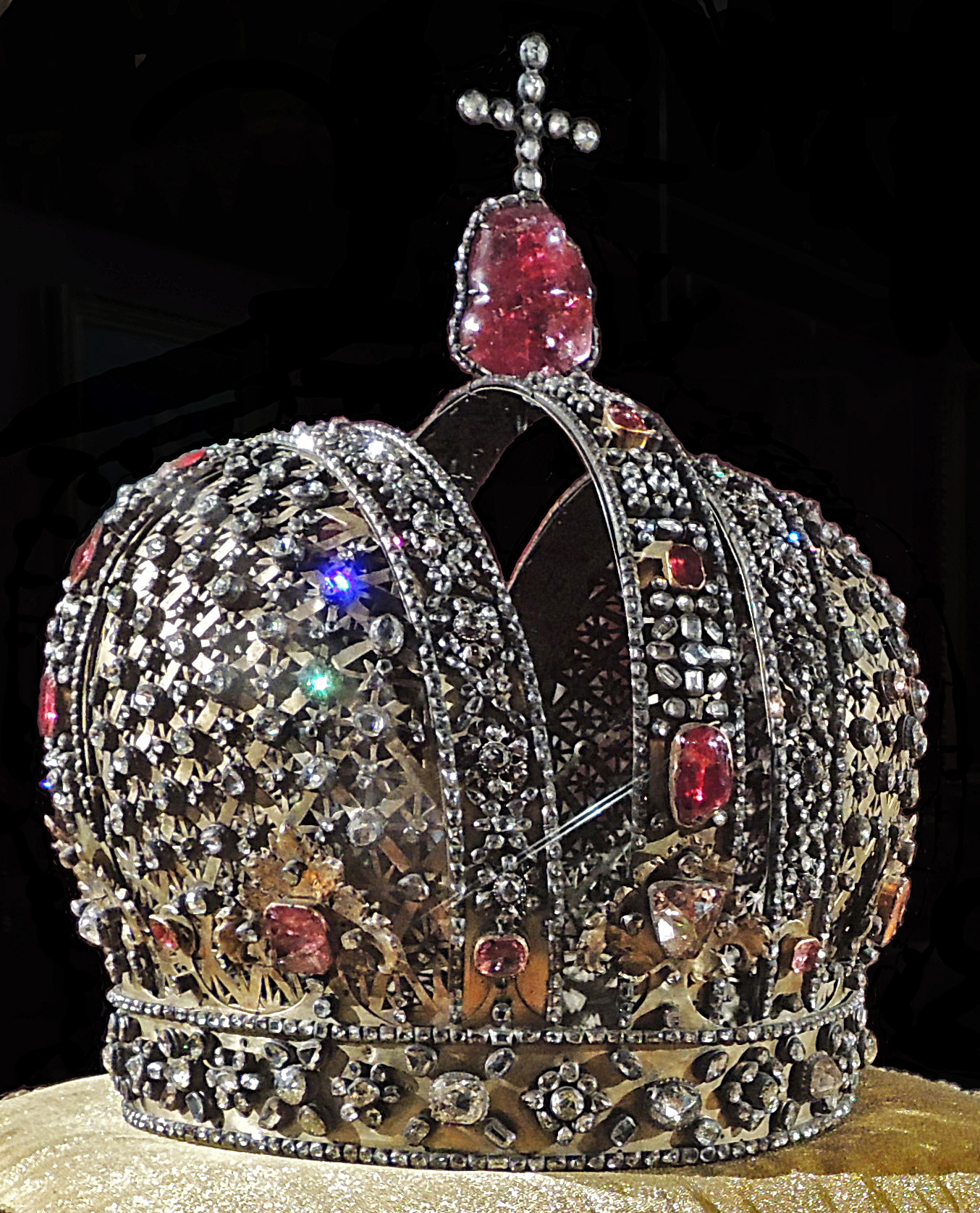
Crown of Anna of Russia

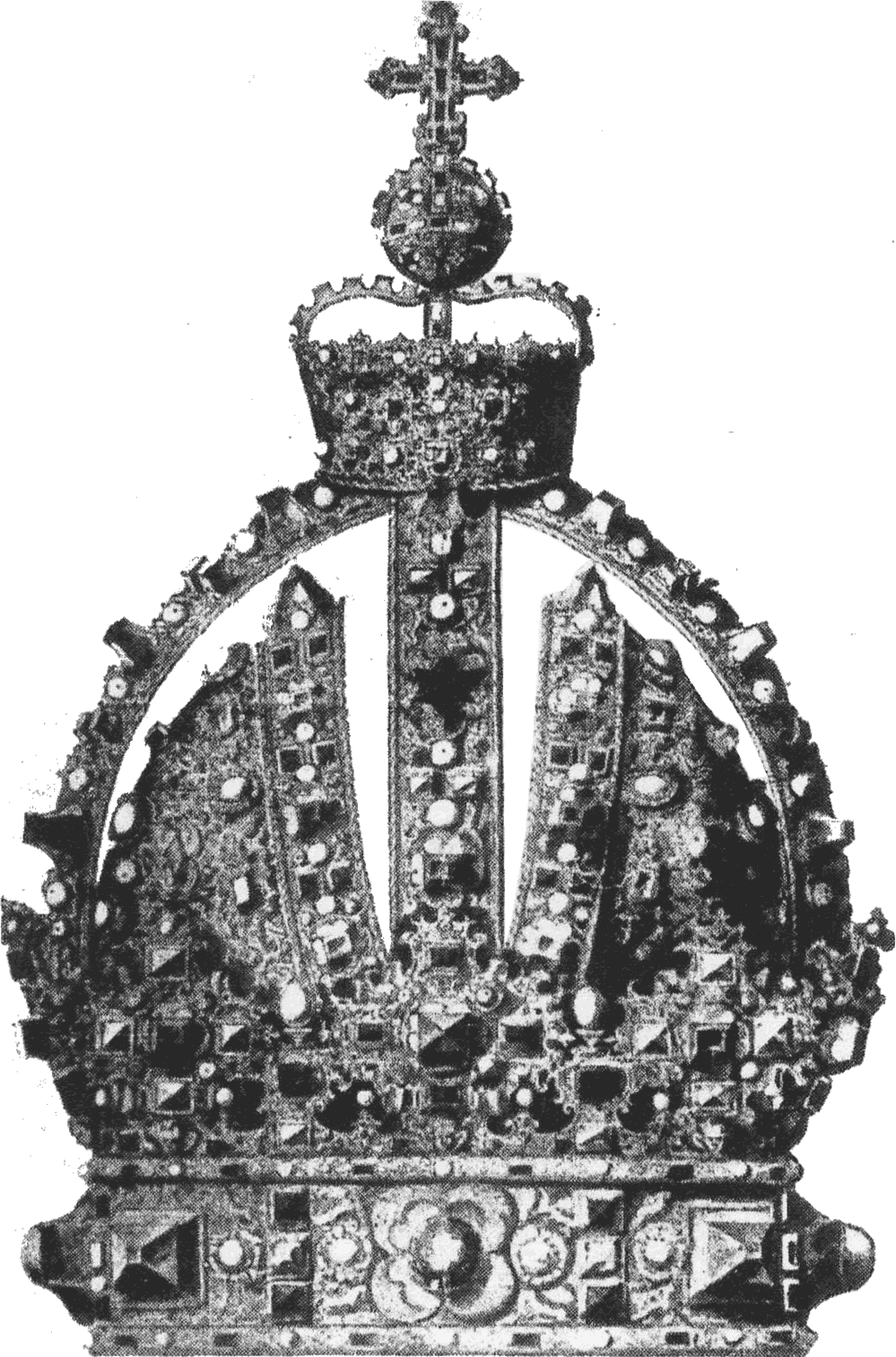
Never realized design for Christian IV of Denmark, 1594

=== Imperial crowns with high arches ===
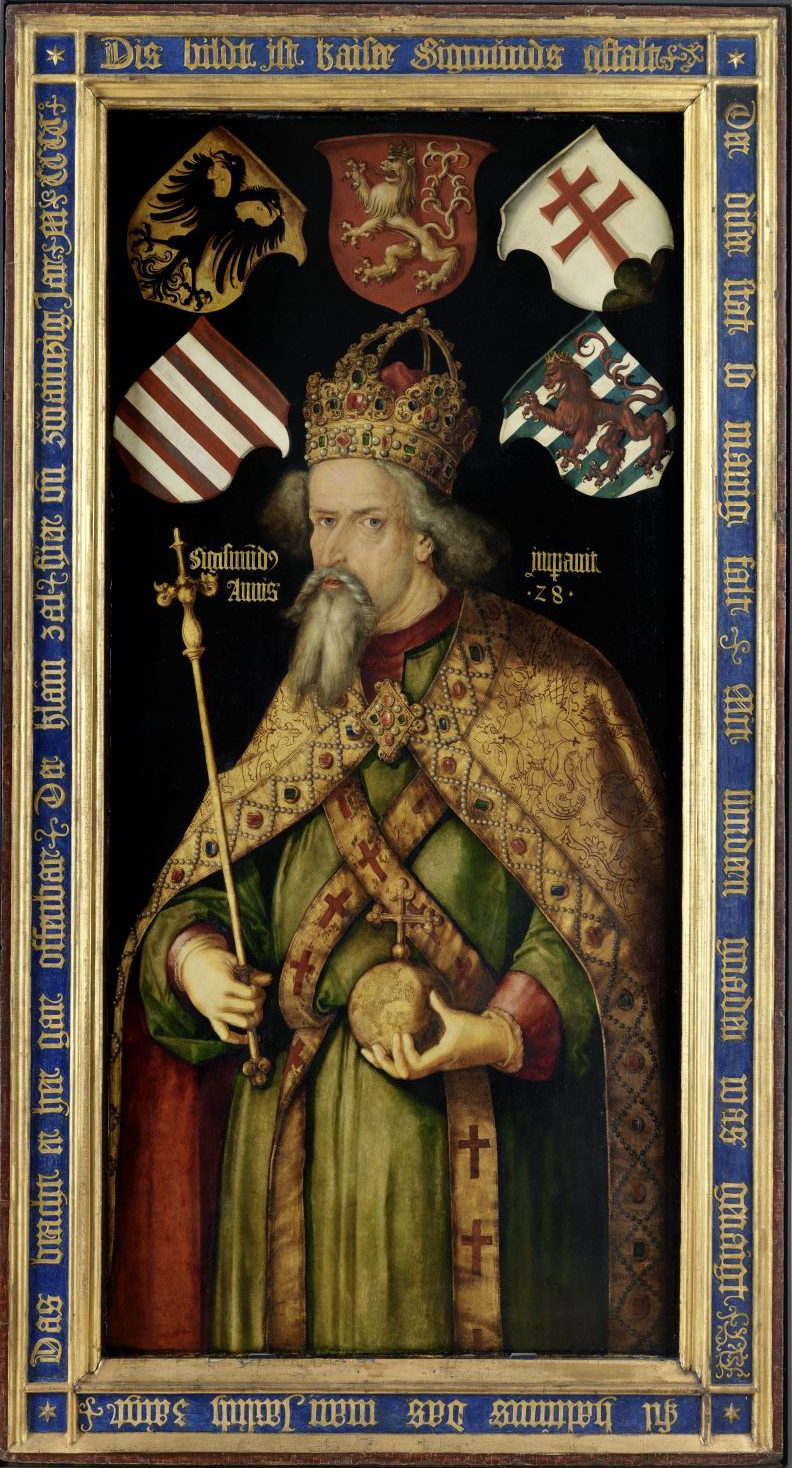
Dürer's portrait of Emperor Sigismund

=== Prussian-German imperial crowns ===
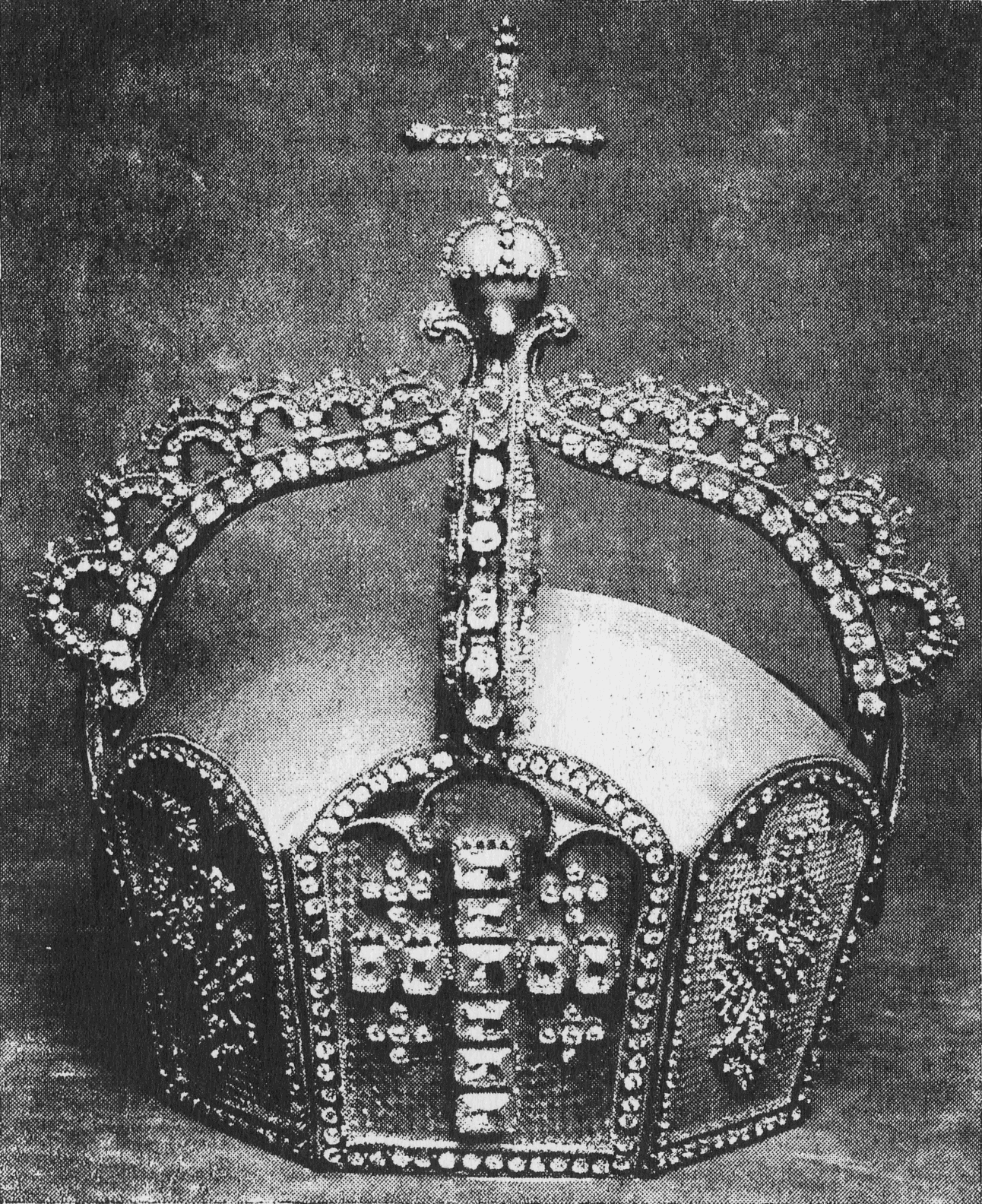
German State Crown, wooden model, 1872

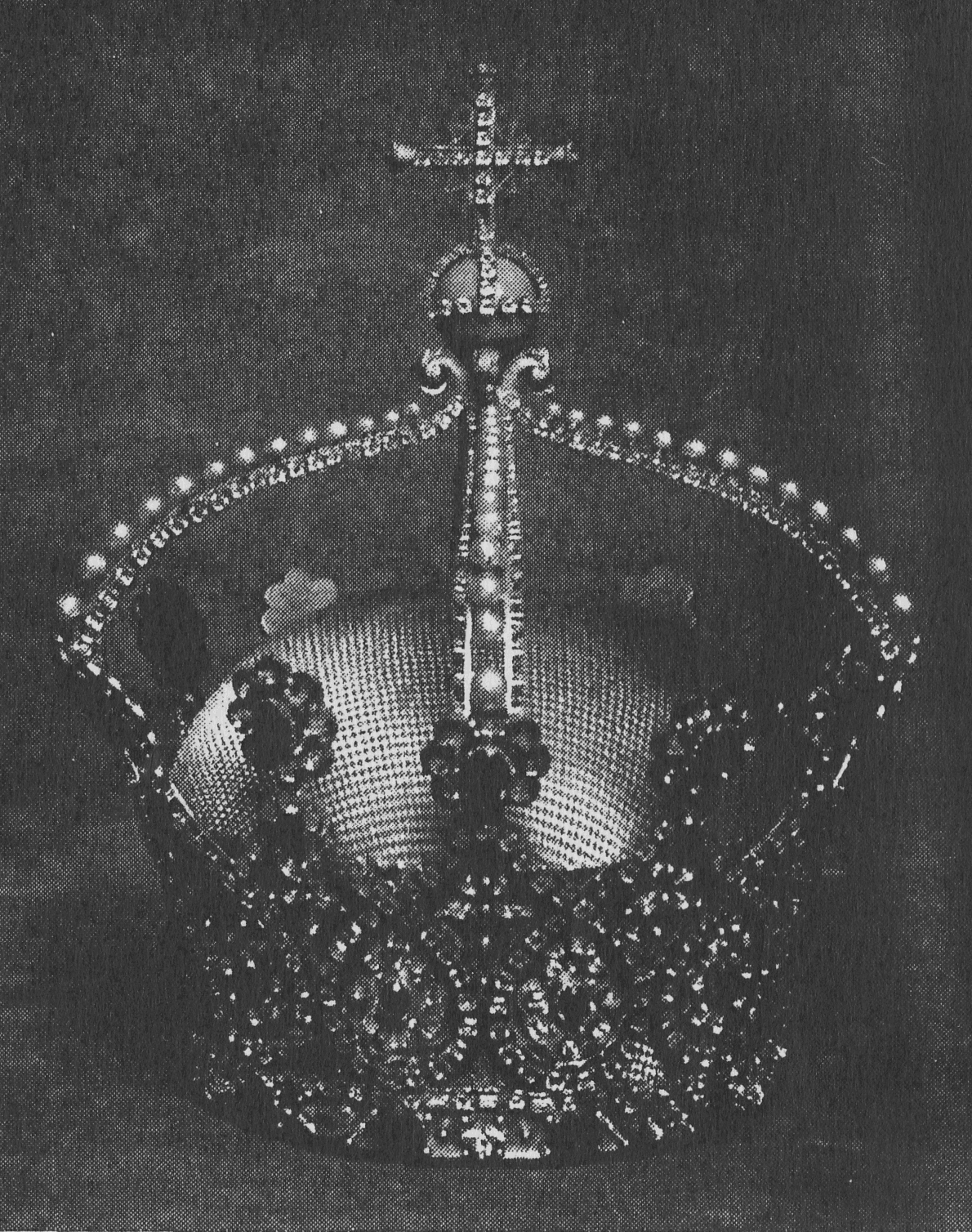
Empress Crown, wooden model, 1872

=== Napoleonic imperial crowns ===
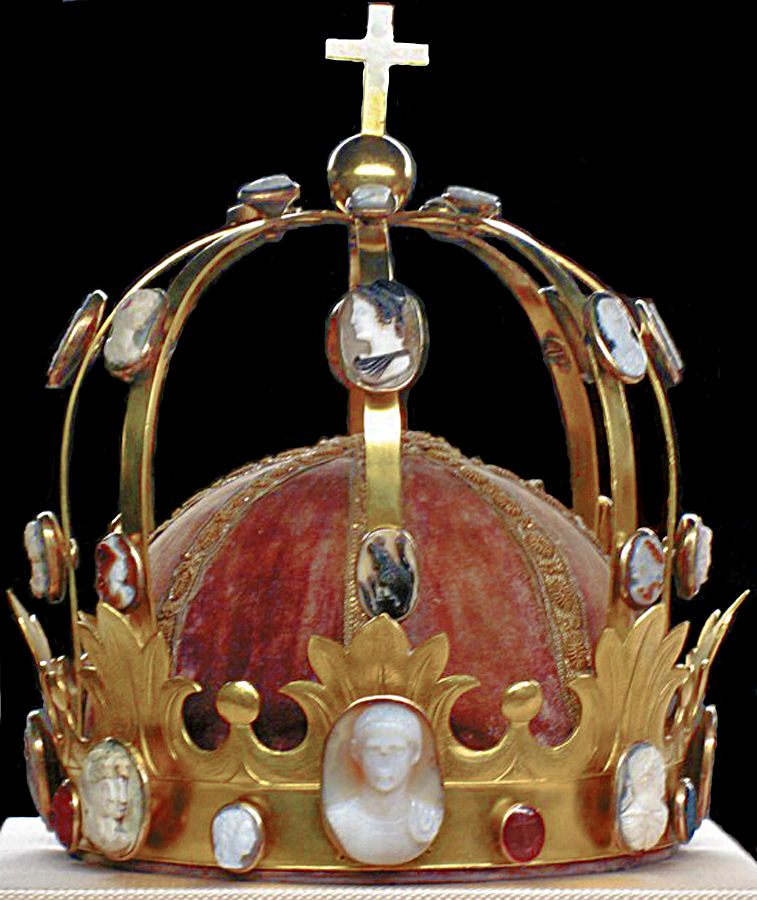
Imperial Crown of Napoleon Bonaparte, called the "Crown of Charlemagne"

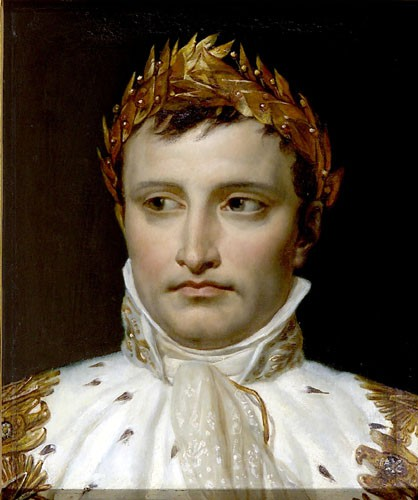
Napoleon Bonaparte with the Laurels crown (destroyed in 1819)

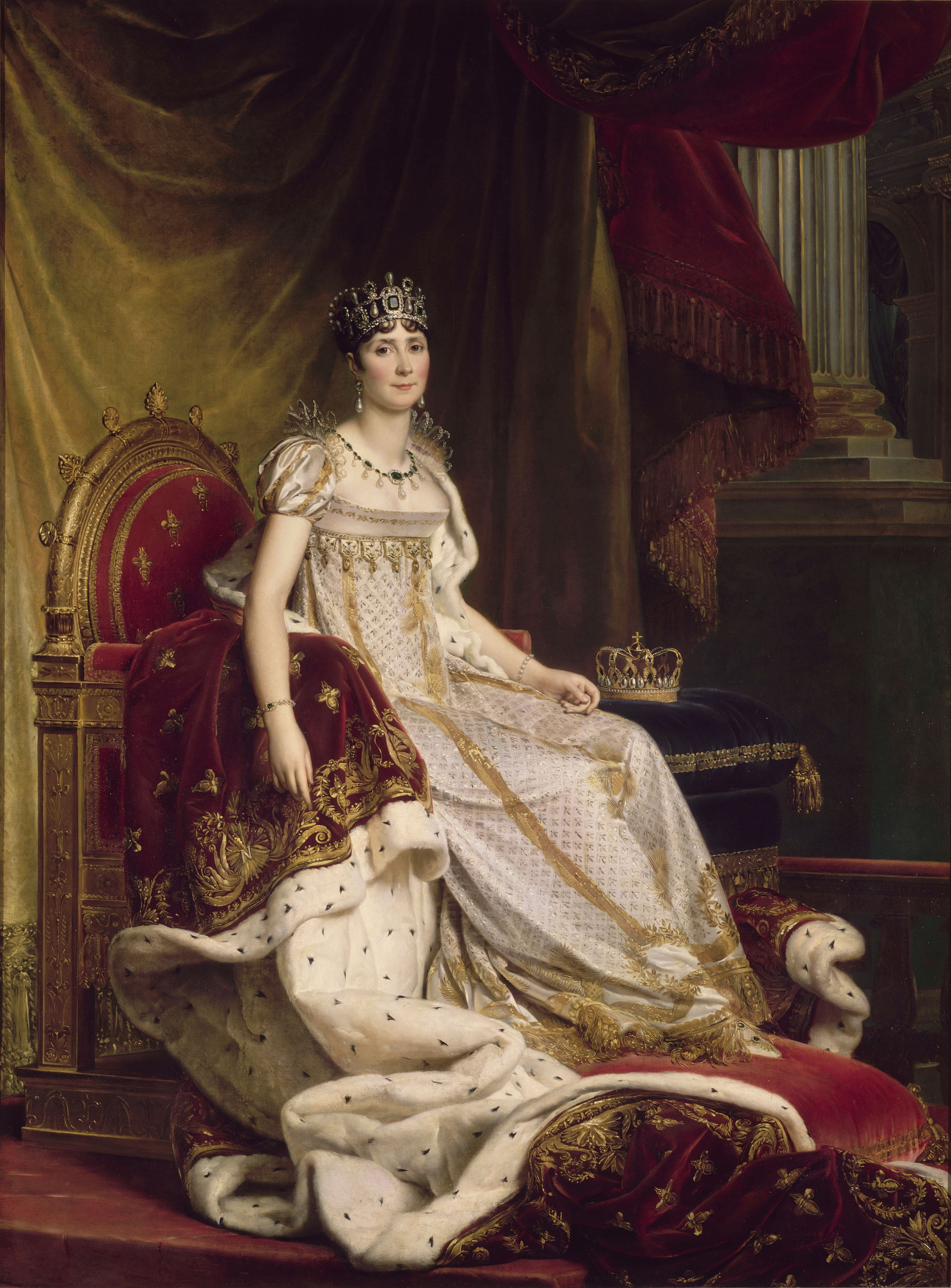
Empress Josephine with empress crowns (destroyed in 1819)

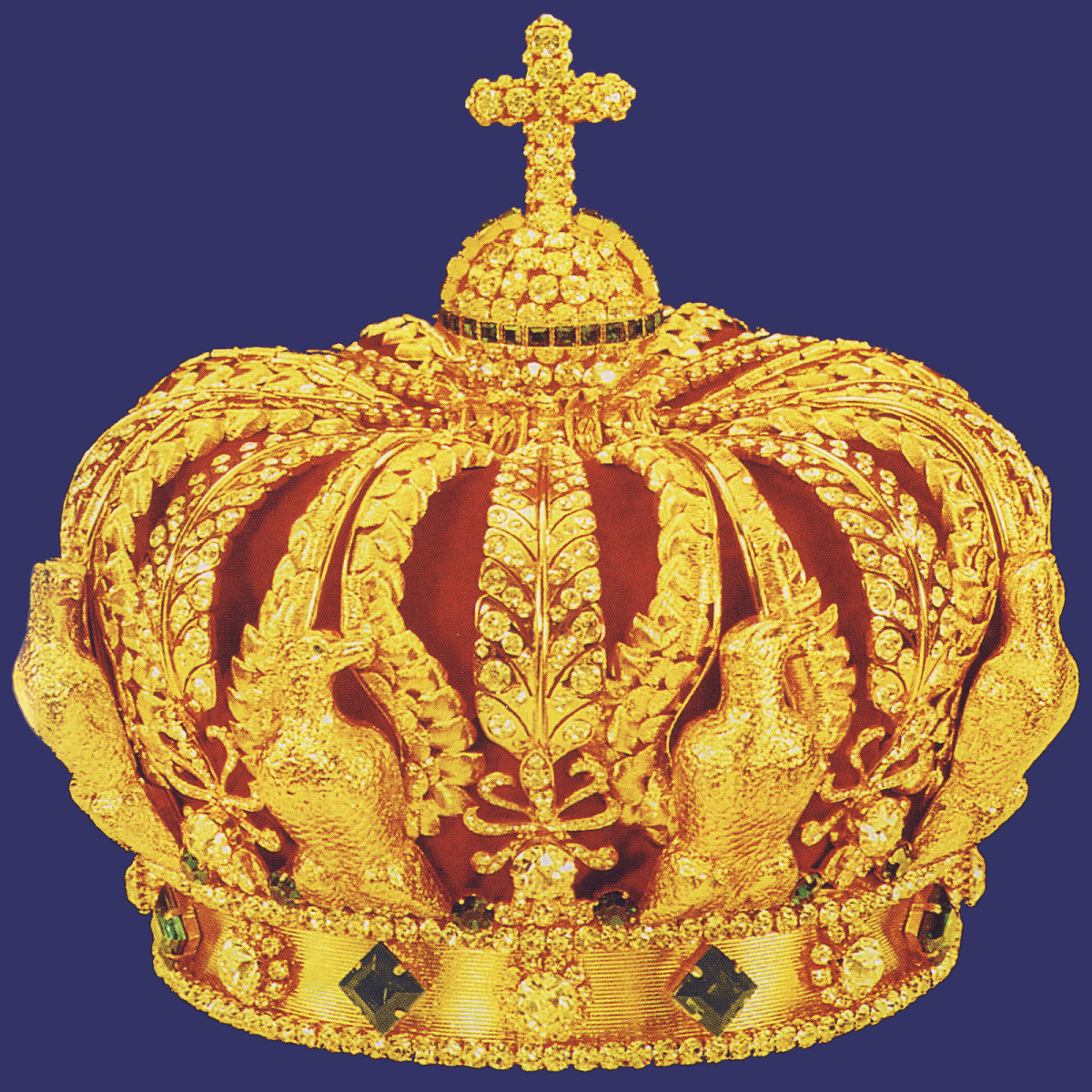
Crown of Napoleon III (destroyed in 1871); reproduction displayed at the Abeler collection of crowns and regalia in Wuppertal

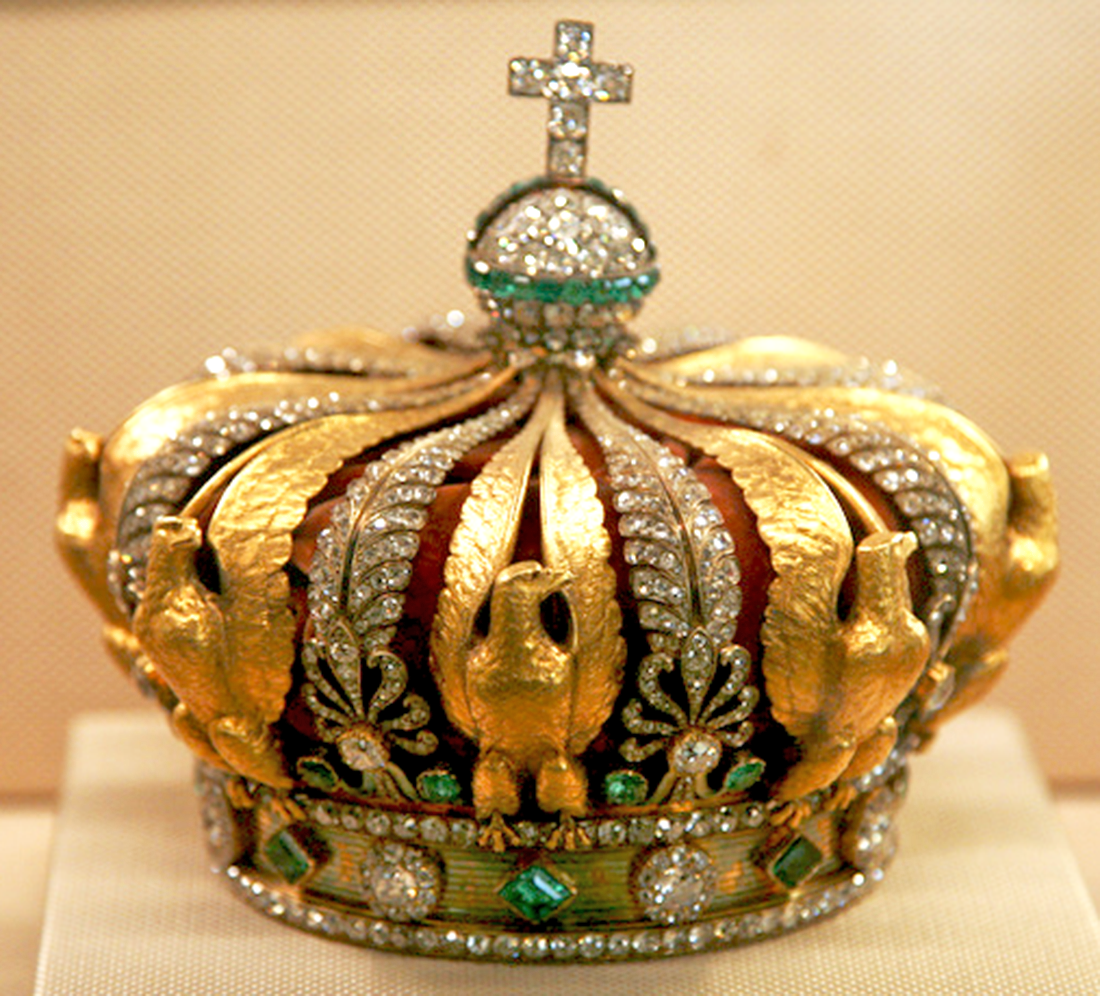
Crown of Empress Eugénie (damaged in 2025)

Imperial Crown of Mexico, Second Empire, partially modeled on French versions of Napoleon III’s crown and the Crown of Empress Eugénie, as sponsors

=== Imperial crowns based on the design of European royal crowns ===
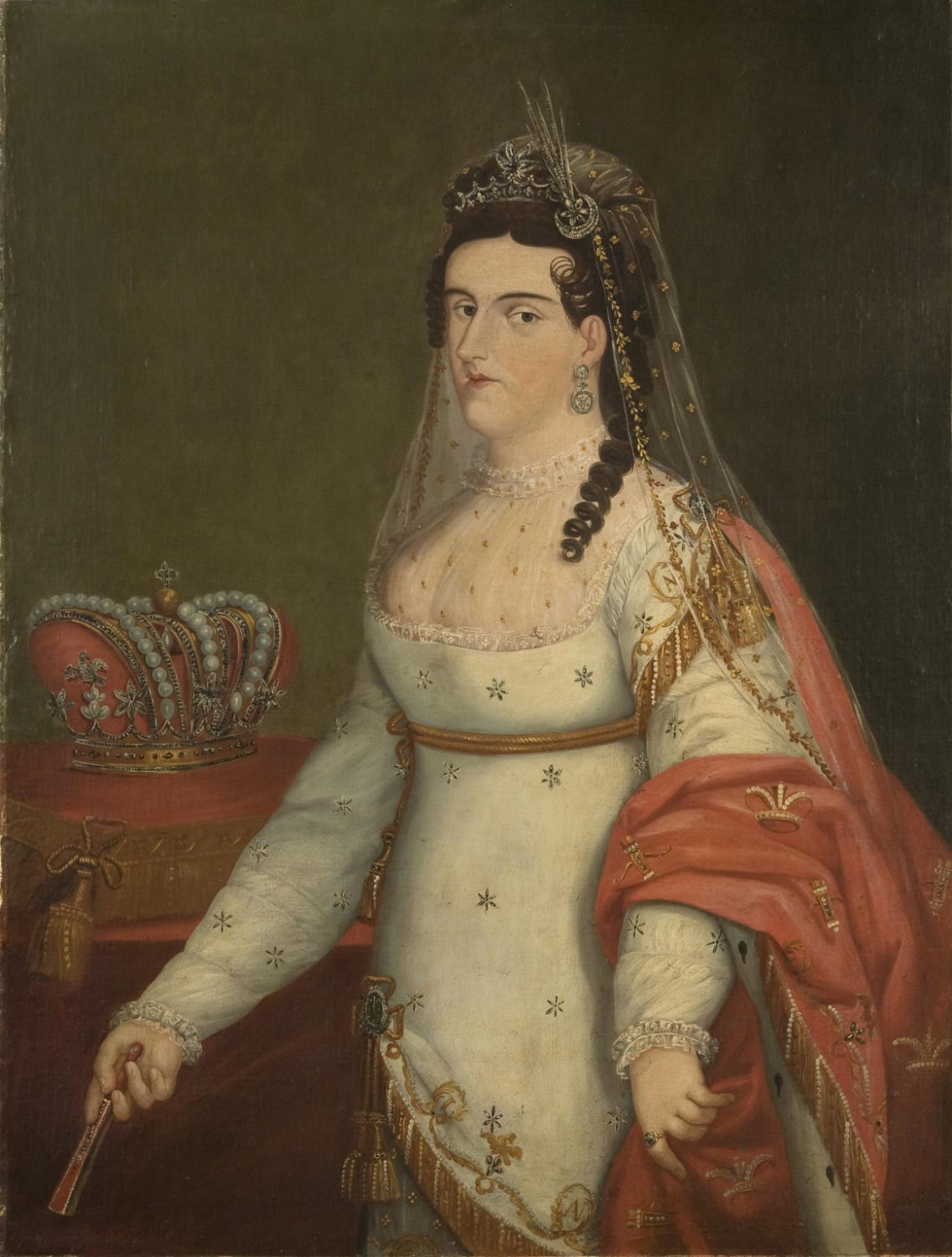
Empress Ana Maria of Mexico with the Crown of the First Mexican Empire

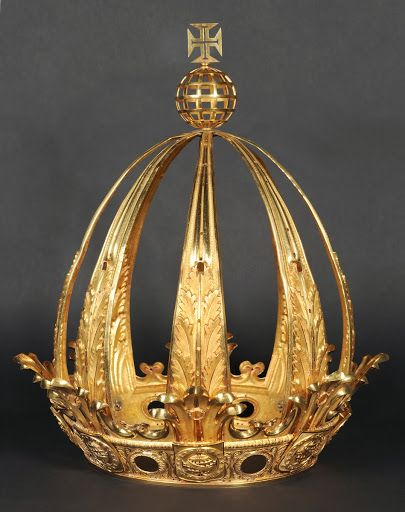
Brazilian Imperial Crown of Pedro I

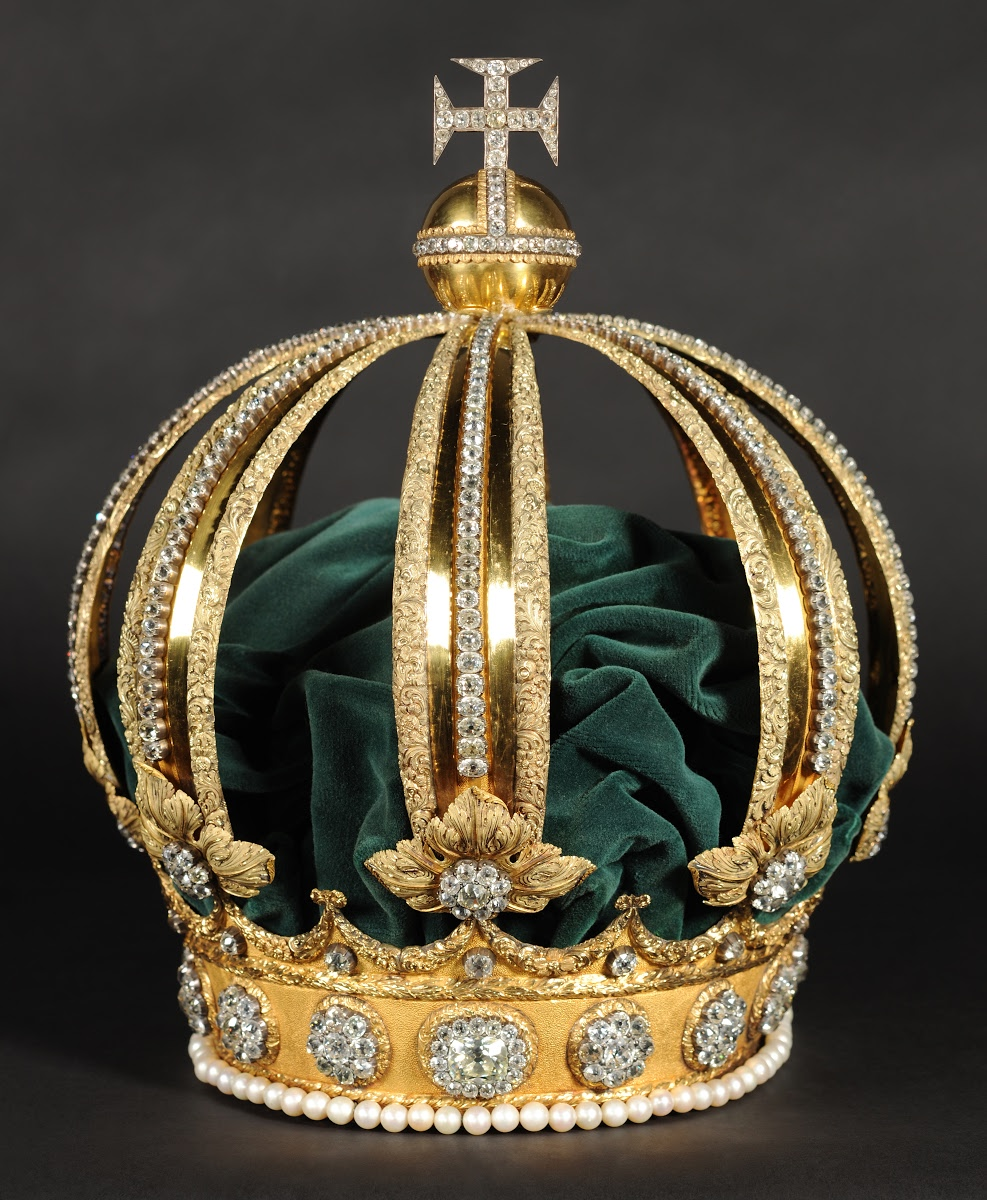
Brazilian Imperial Crown of Pedro II

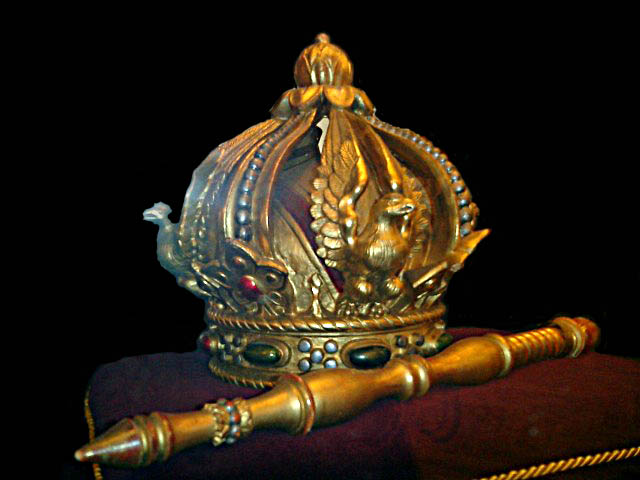
Design of the Imperial Crown of Mexico seen in paintings of Maximilian I of Mexico during the Second Mexican Empire

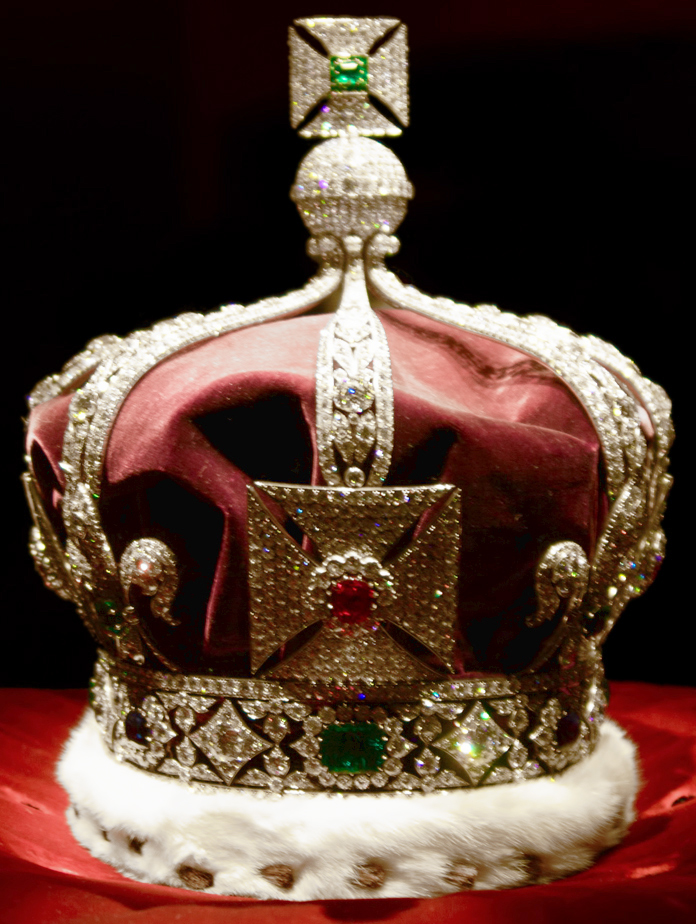
Imperial Crown of India — the Imperial Crown worn by King George V at the Delhi Durbar in 1911.

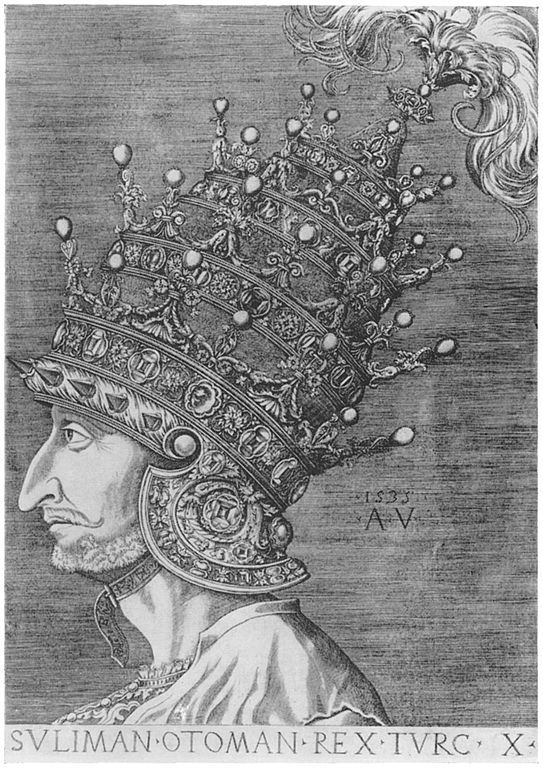
Süleyman the Magnificent's Venetian Helmet (destroyed and lost)

=== Other imperial crowns without European origin or influence ===
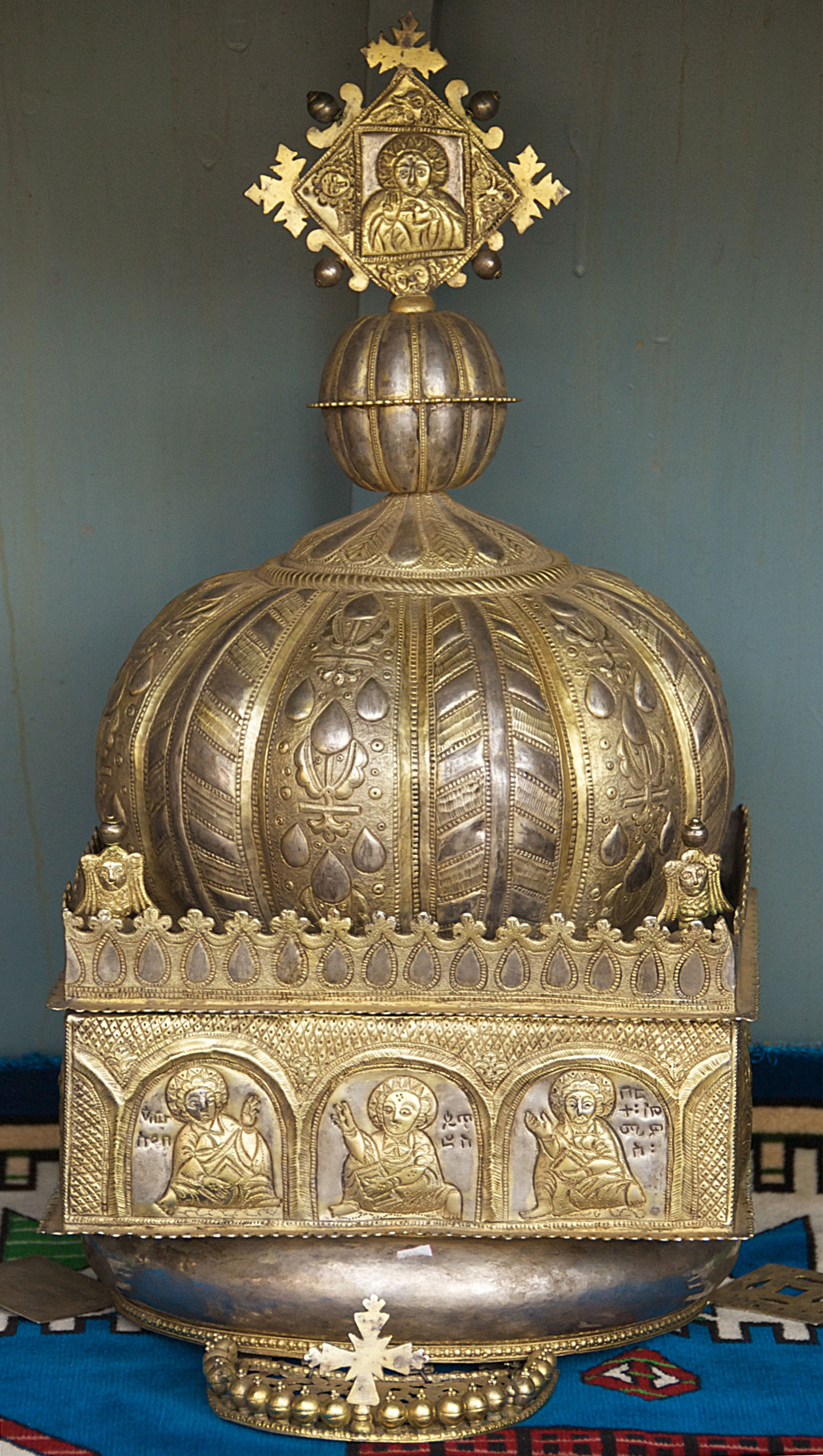
Imperial Ethiopian crown

==== Imperial Crowns of Iran ====
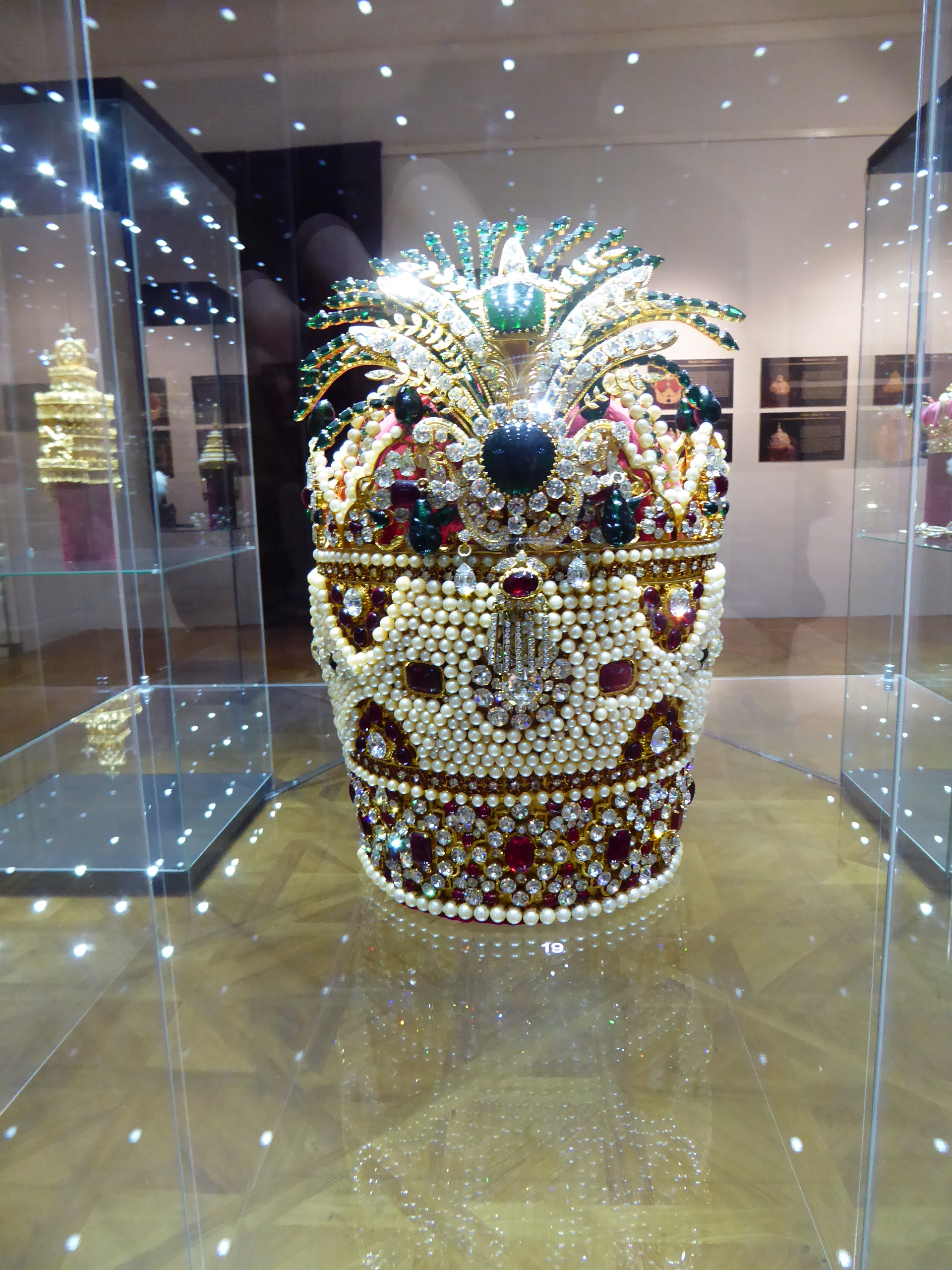
Kiani Crown, Imperial Crown in of the Qajar dynasty (1789–1925)

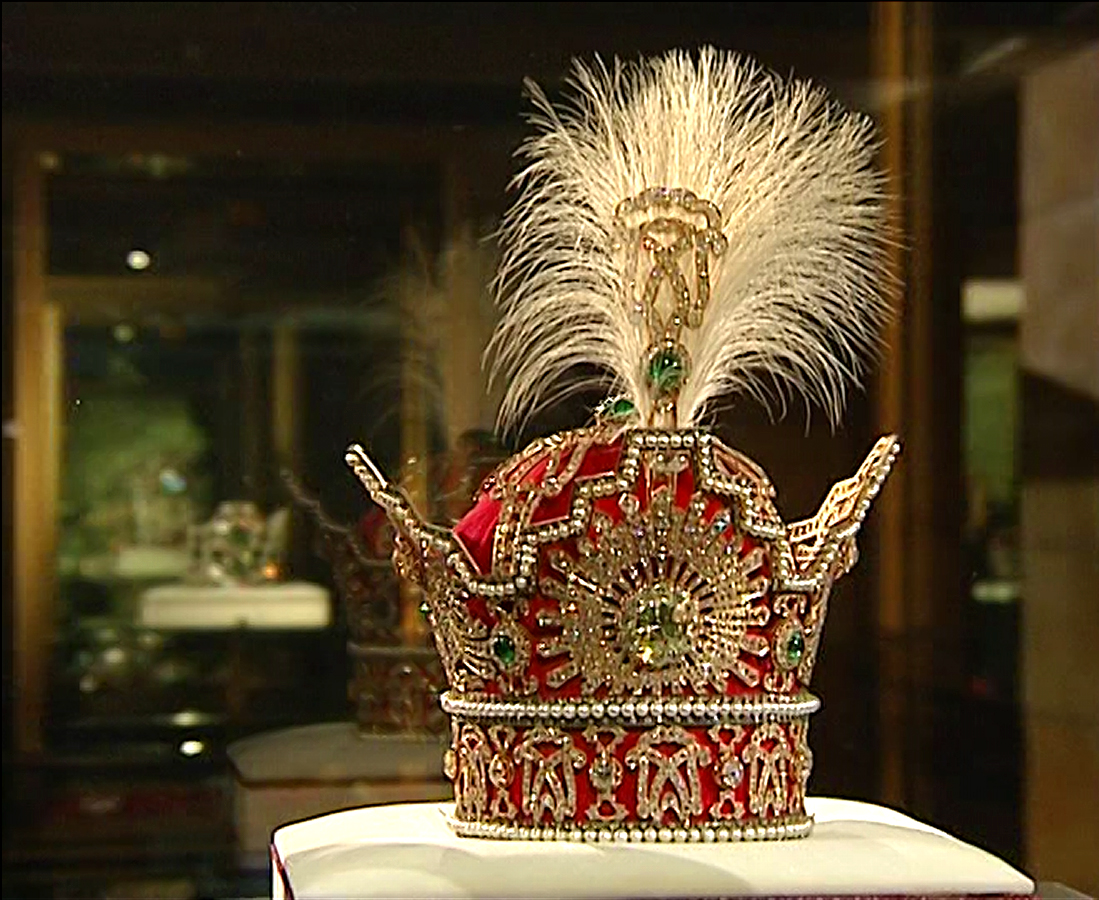
Pahlavi Crown, Imperial Crown of the Pahlavi dynasty (1925–1979)

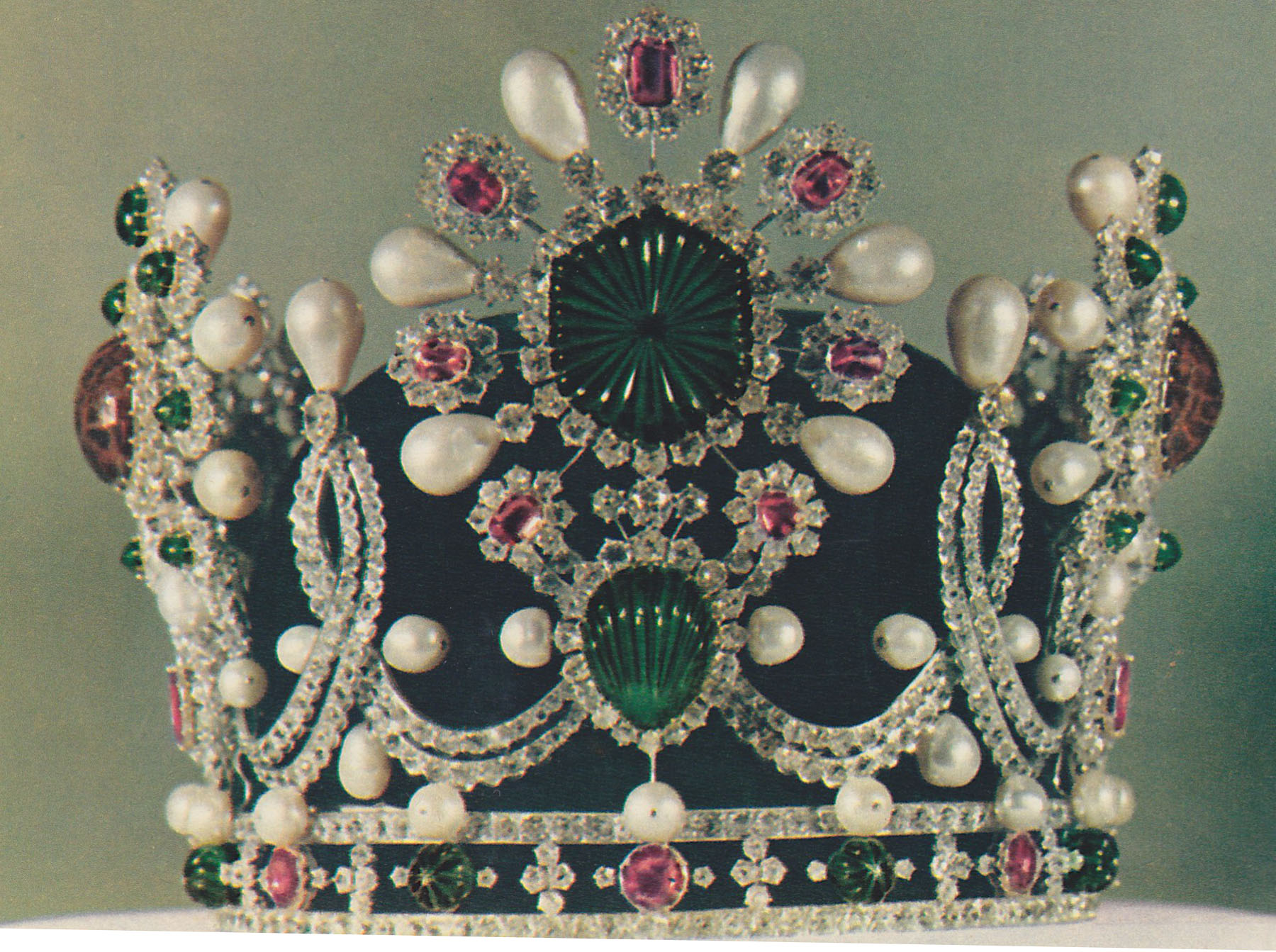
Empress's Crown, Imperial Crown of Empress Consort Farah Pahlavi

==== Imperial Crowns of China ====
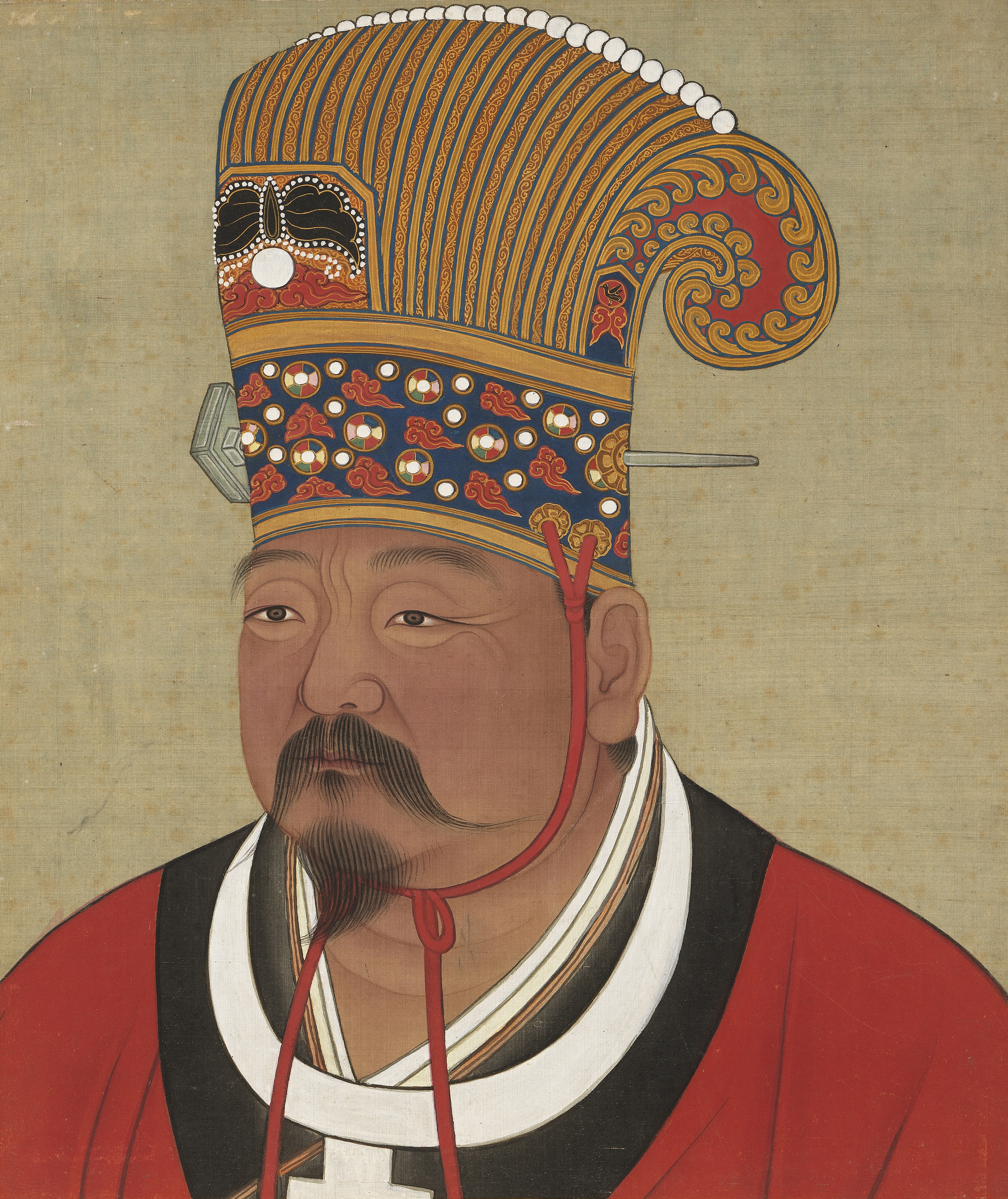
Imperial Crown for Ceremonial Use by Emperor Xuanzu of the Song Dynasty, China

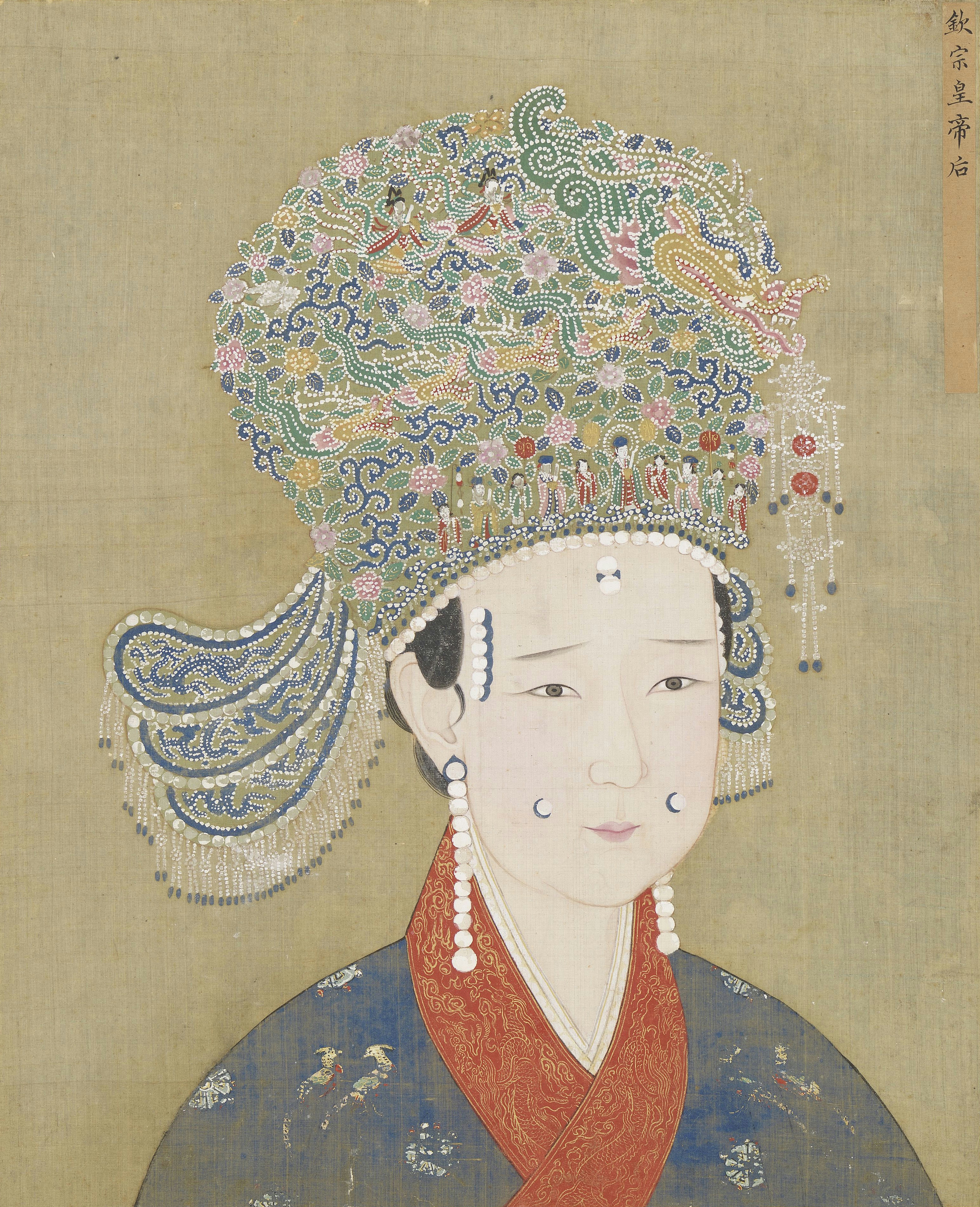
The ceremonial Fengguan of Empress Renhuai of the Song Dynasty, China

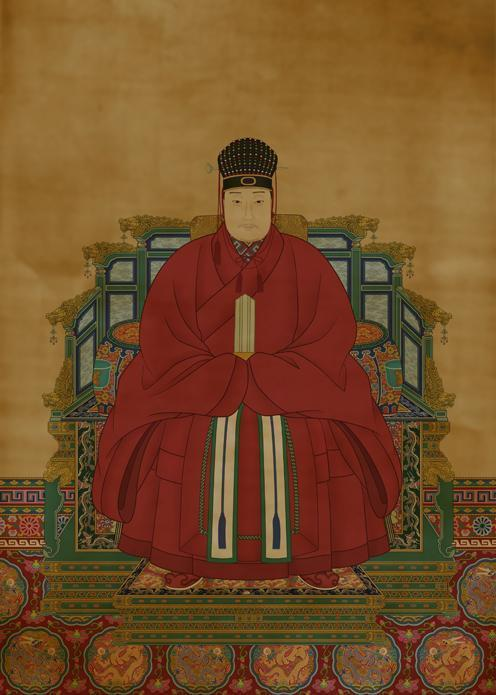
The ceremonial imperial crown used by Ming Dynasty emperors during court assemblies, China

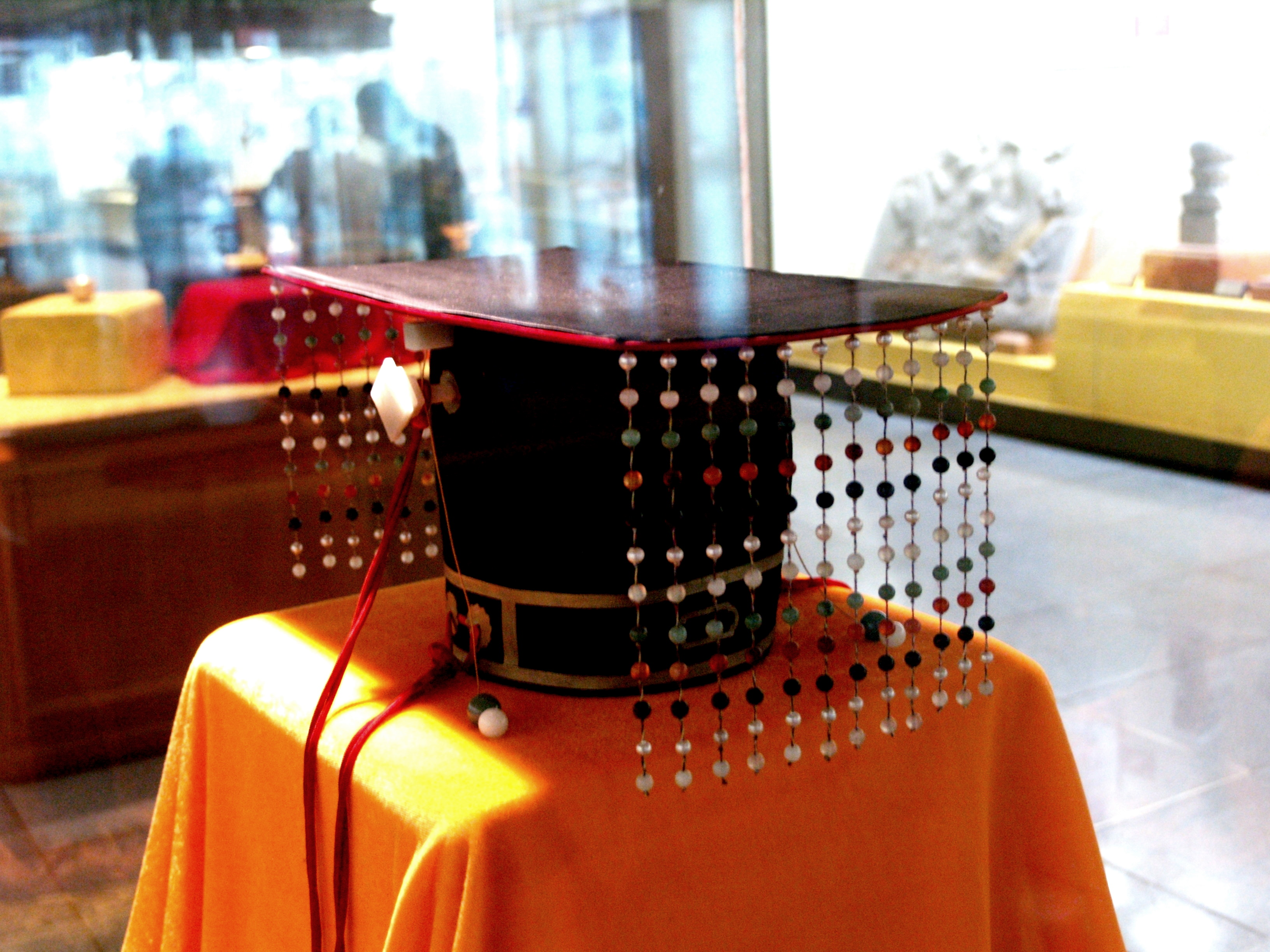
Ming Dynasty Emperor Imperial Crown for full ceremonial dress, China

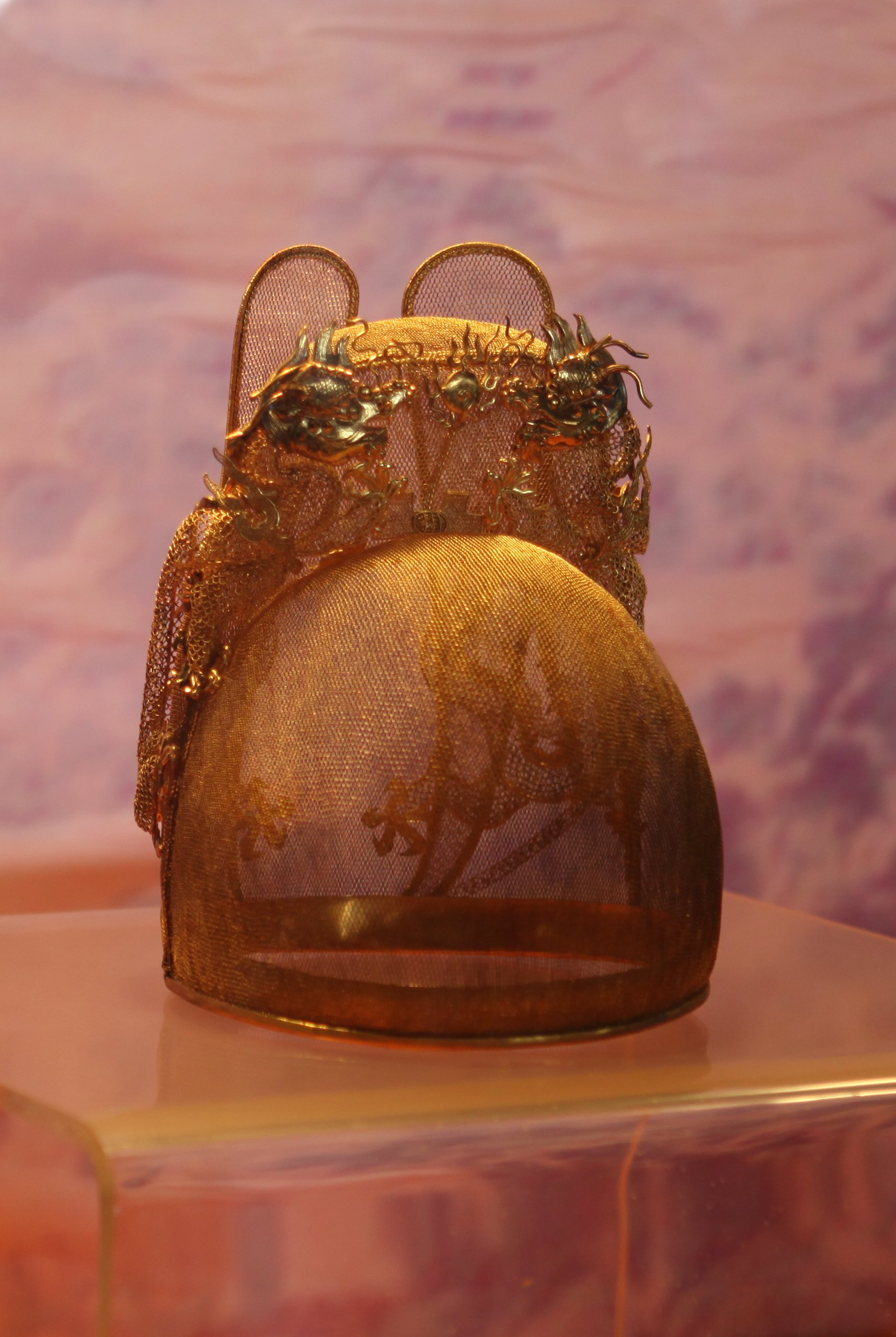
Ming Dynasty Emperor Gold Funeral Crown, China

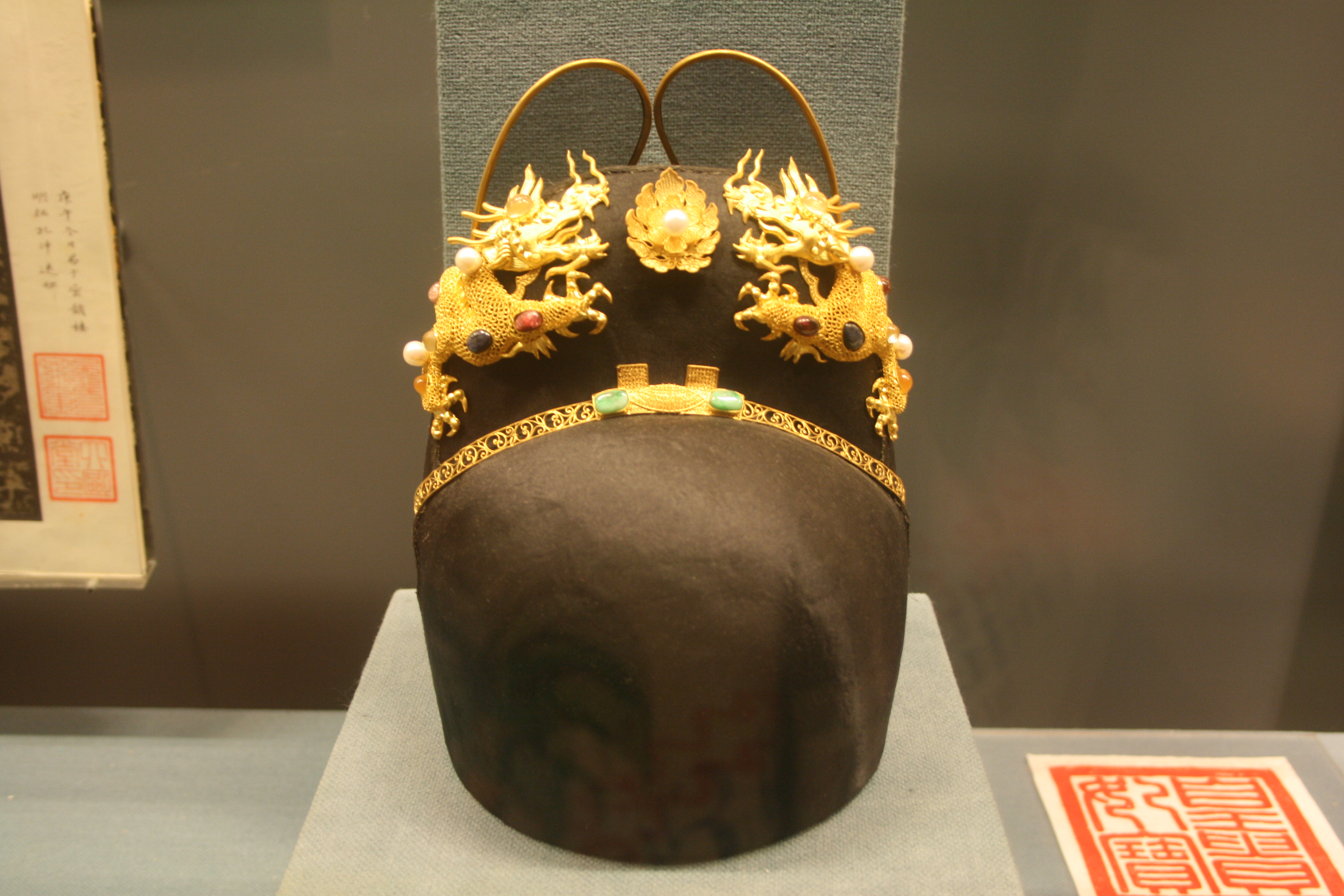
Crowns used daily by Ming Dynasty emperors, China

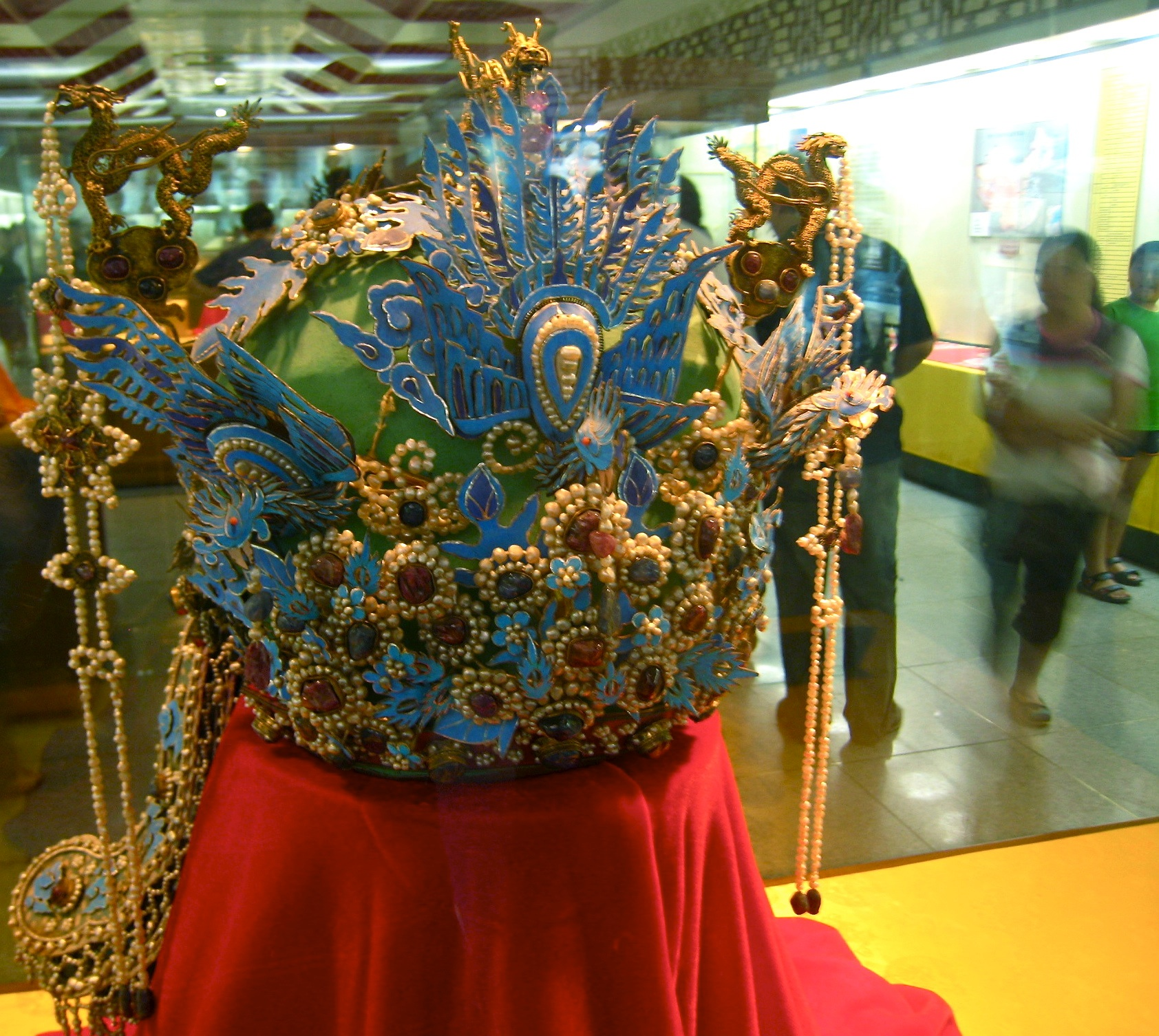
Ming Dynasty Empress Fengguan, China

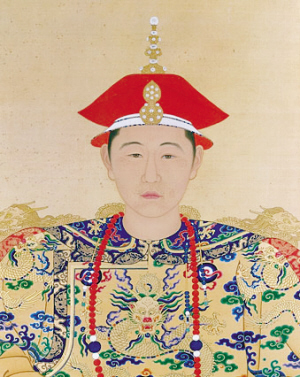
Kangxi Emperor of Qing dynasty wearing Imperial Crown, China

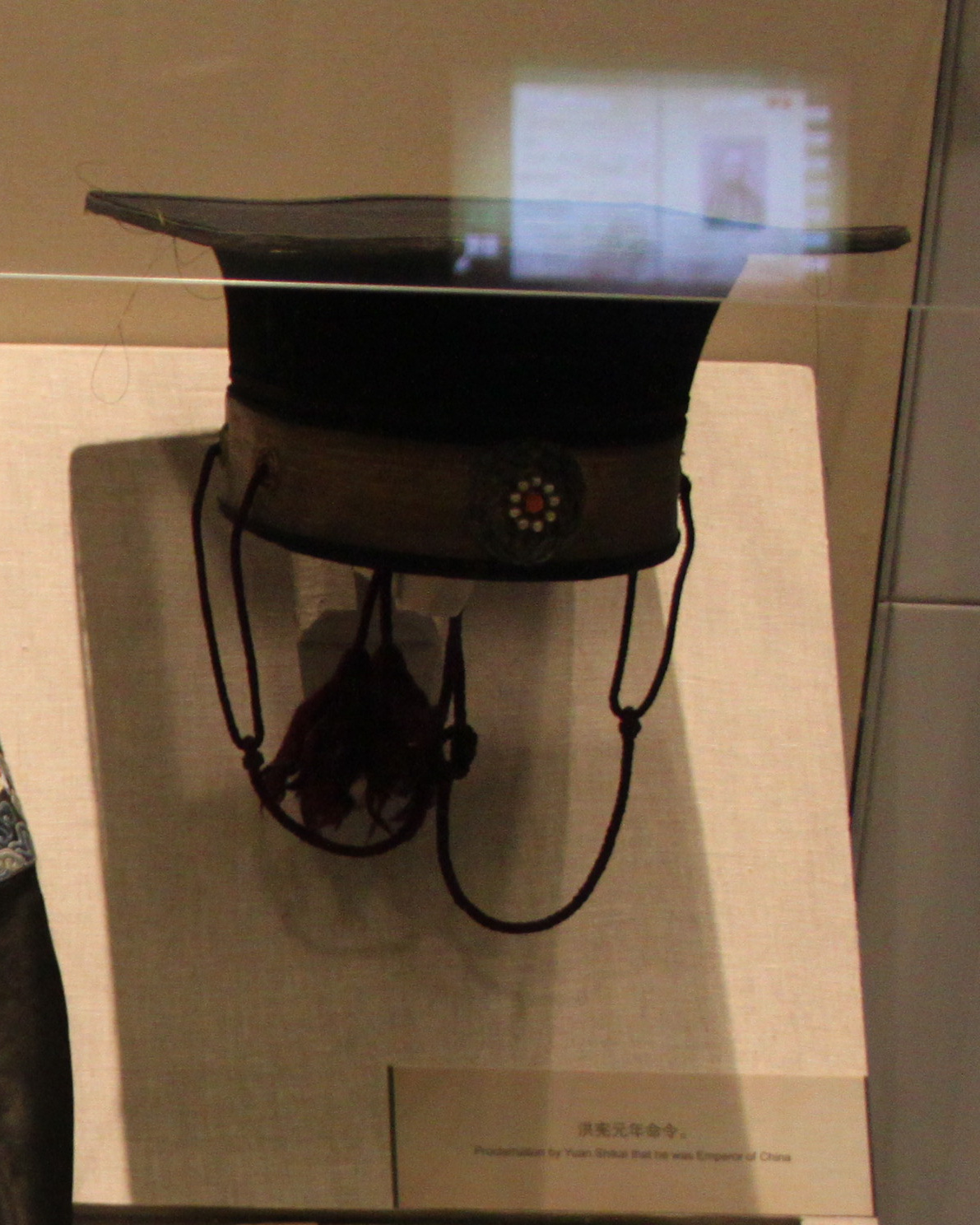
Imperial Crown of the Empire of China — worn by Yuan Shikai when he proclaimed himself emperor in 1915.

===== Other Imperial Crowns of Chinese Origin or Influence =====
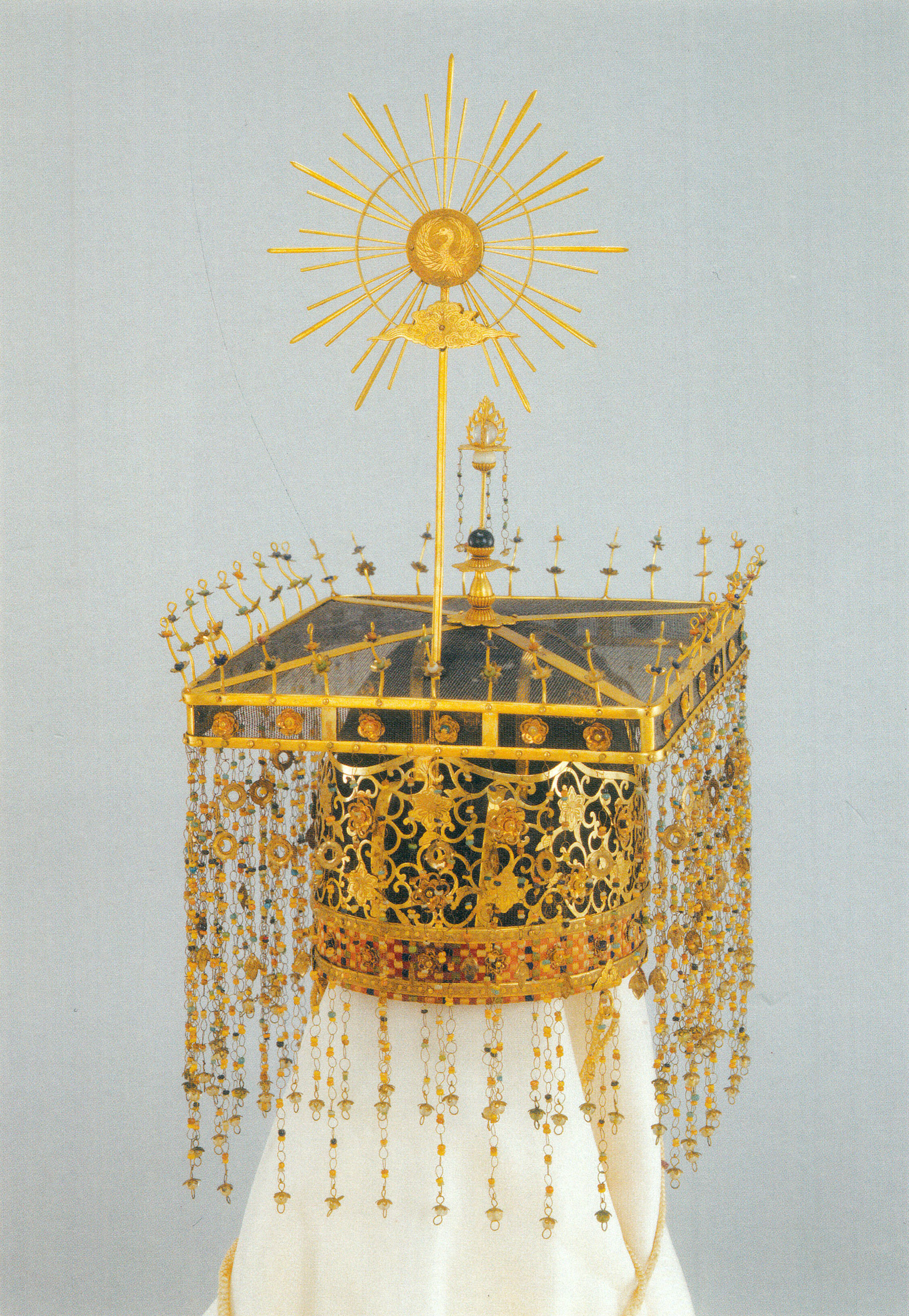
Imperial Crown of Japanese Emperor Kōmei, 19th century

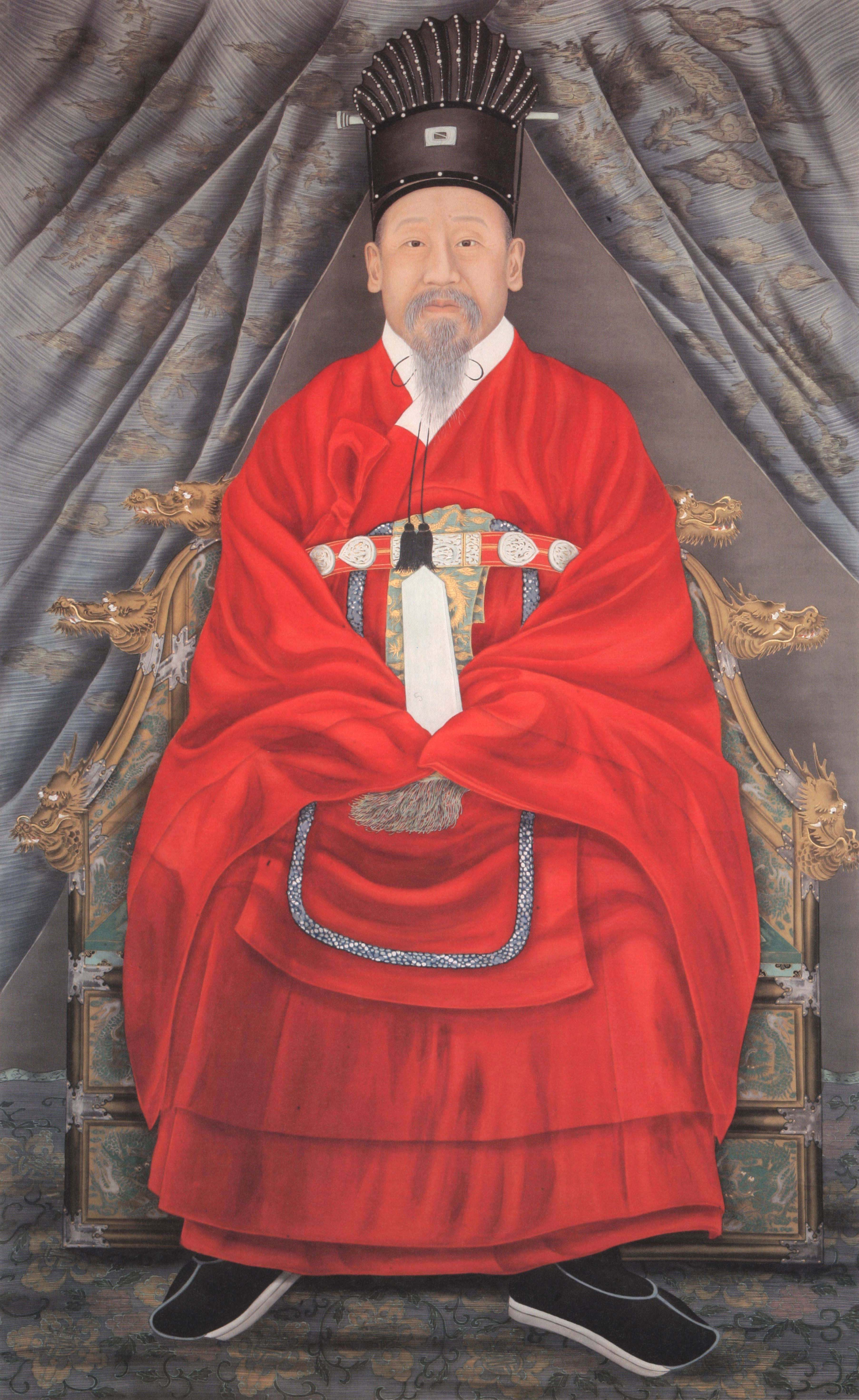
Emperor Gojong of Korean Empire wearing Imperial Crown

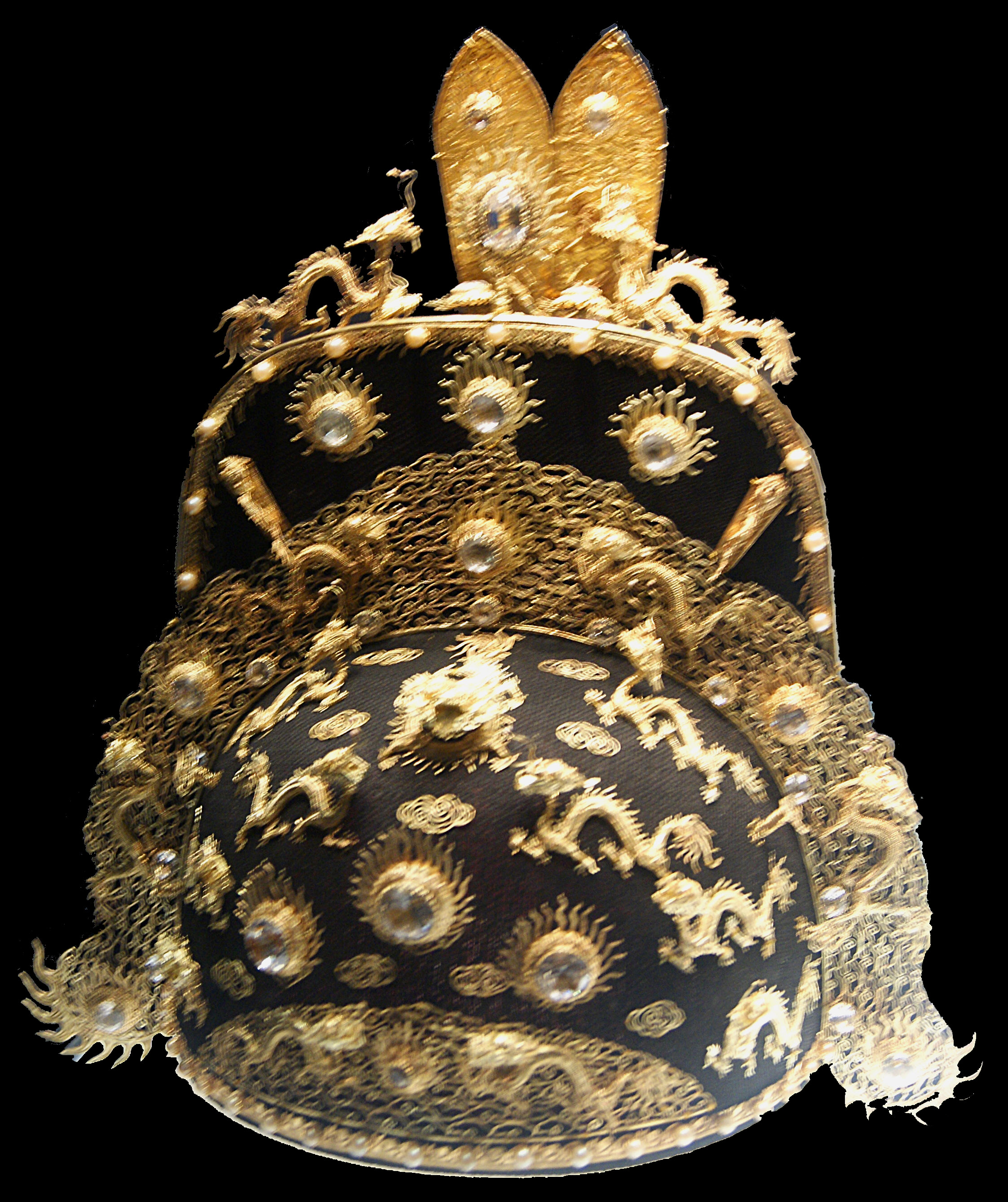
Vietnamese Nguyen dynasty Imperial Crown

== Heraldic imperial crowns ==
A list of prominent examples of depictions of imperial crowns displayed atop heraldic achievements or as heraldic charge includes:

Holy Roman Empire
Older design
(with high arches)

Holy Roman Empire
Modern design
(with an arch and mitre)
Often considered as the generic design of the imperial crowns

Holy Roman Empire, variant especially common in the Spanish heraldic tradition

Russian Empire

Austrian Empire

Ethiopian Empire

Iran (Qajar)

Iran (Pahlavi)

First French Empire

Second French Empire

Brazilian Empire

First Mexican Empire

Second Mexican Empire

German Empire
Heraldic representation changed in 1889

England/United Kingdom/Commonwealth Realms

Central African Empire

== Legal usage ==
Because Pope Clement VII would not grant Henry VIII of England an annulment of his marriage to Catherine of Aragon, the English Parliament passed the Act in Restraint of Appeals (1533) in which it was explicitly stated that

Where by divers sundry old authentic histories and chronicles it is manifestly declared and expressed that this realm of England is an empire, and so hath been accepted in the world, governed by one supreme head and king, having the dignity and royal estate of the imperial crown of the same.

The next year the Act of Supremacy (1534) explicitly tied the headship of the church to the imperial crown:

The only supreme head in earth of the Church of England called Anglicana Ecclesia, and shall have and enjoy annexed and united to the imperial crown of this realm.

During the reign of Mary I the First Act of Supremacy was annulled, but during the reign of Elizabeth I the Second Act of Supremacy, with similar wording to the First Act, was passed in 1559. During the English Interregnum the laws were annulled, but the acts which caused the laws to be in abeyance were themselves, deemed to be null and void by the Parliaments of the English Restoration, so by act of Parliament The Crown of England and (later the British and UK crowns) are imperial crowns.

== See also ==
- Consort crown
- Coronation crown
- Royal crown
- State crown
