= Austrian Crown Jewels =

Regalia worn by archdukes and emperors of Austria

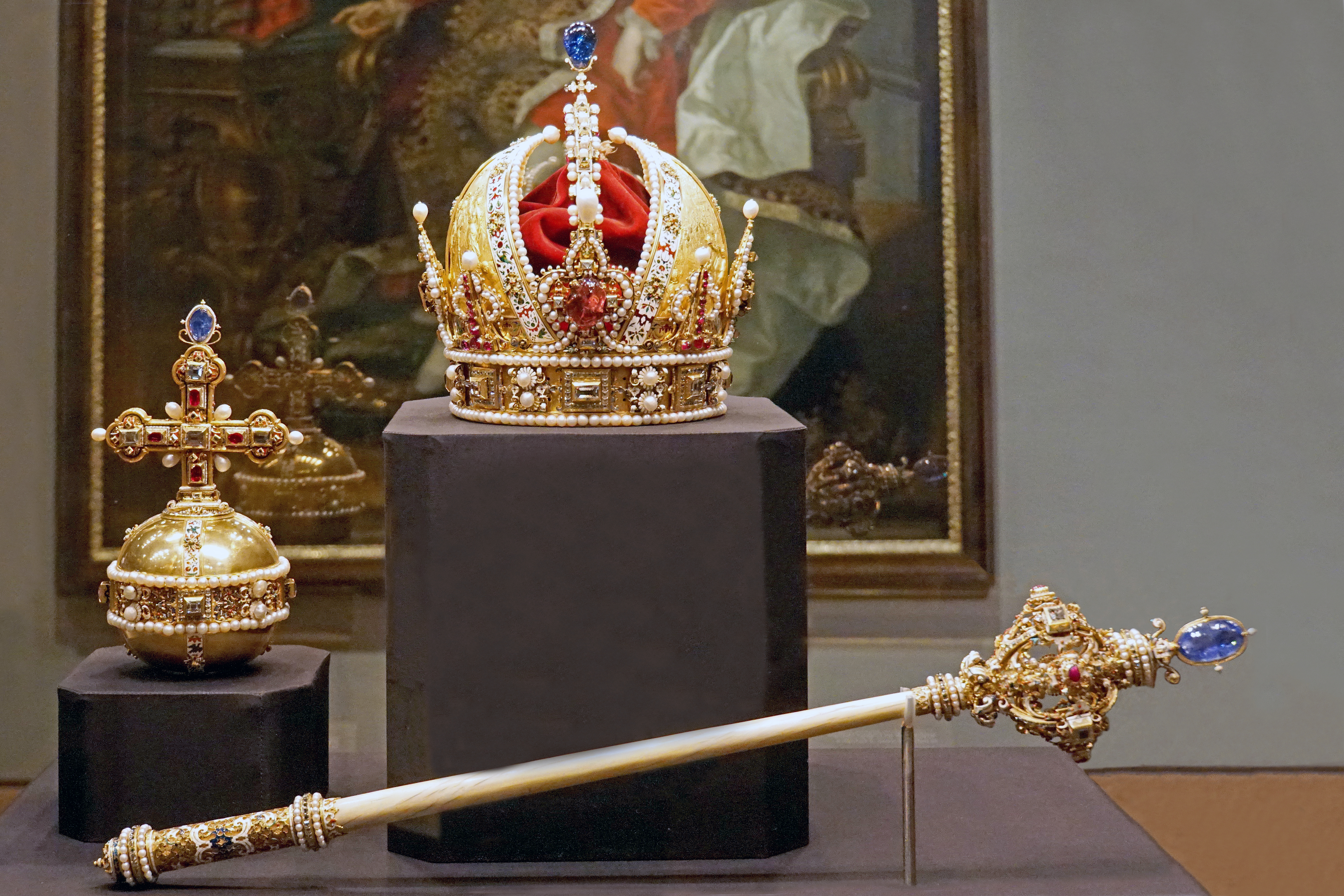
The Imperial Crown, Orb, and Sceptre of Austria

The Austrian Crown Jewels is the collective term for the regalia, insignia, crown jewels, jewellery and vestments owned and worn by the House of Habsburg rulers and members of the imperial family. These include the regalia of the Holy Roman Emperor, and later by the Emperor of Austria, during the coronation ceremony and other state functions. The term refers to the following objects: the crowns, sceptres, orbs, swords, rings, crosses, holy relics and royal robes, as well as several other objects connected with the ceremony. The collection dates from the 10th to the 19th centuries, and it reflects more than a thousand years of European history. The vast majority is kept in the Imperial Treasury at the Hofburg Palace in Vienna, Austria.

The most outstanding objects are the insignia of the hereditary Empire of Austria, later Austria-Hungary. They consist of the Imperial Crown, the Imperial Orb and Sceptre, the mantle of the Austrian Empire, and the Coronation Robes of the Kingdom of Lombardy–Venetia. The Imperial Crown, Orb, Cross, and Holy Lance of the Holy Roman Empire are also highlights. The first five parts are called the Weltliche Schatzkammer (secular/worldly treasury) and the ecclesiastical part the Geistliche Schatzkammer (spiritual treasury). The Schatzkammer is under the administration of the Kunsthistorisches Museum (Museum of Fine Arts).

== Insignia of the Austrian hereditary homage ==
Austria began as a small march and was later elevated to a duchy, then archduchy. The house of Babenberg and later the Habsburg dynasty were the margraves, dukes and later archdukes of this fiefdom. After the death of the last Babenberg duke, Frederick II in 1246, King Ottokar II of Bohemia took over for a while. He was, however, defeated by the King of the Romans Rudolf of Habsburg in 1278, with the help of his sons Albert and Rudolf. Rudolf then installed his son Albert as Duke of Austria. The enthronement ceremony of the new Archduke of Austria was not an actual coronation, but more a ceremony of homage by the estates. In the German language, this ceremony is called the Erbhuldigung. The estates in parliament swore obedience to their new ruler, and he in turn guaranteed their rights and upheld their privileges. However, in this ceremony sovereign insignia were also used.

The Insignia consist of the Austrian archducal hat or archducal coronet, which was made for Joseph II's entry into Frankfurt for his coronation as King of the Romans in 1764. The orb and the sceptre were in use as the royal insignia of the Kingdom of Bohemia until the early 17th century.

- The archducal hat is kept today at the Klosterneuburg Monastery in Lower Austria.
- The ducal hat of Styria is kept at the Landesmuseum Joanneum in Graz, Styria.

== Insignia of the Empire of Austria ==
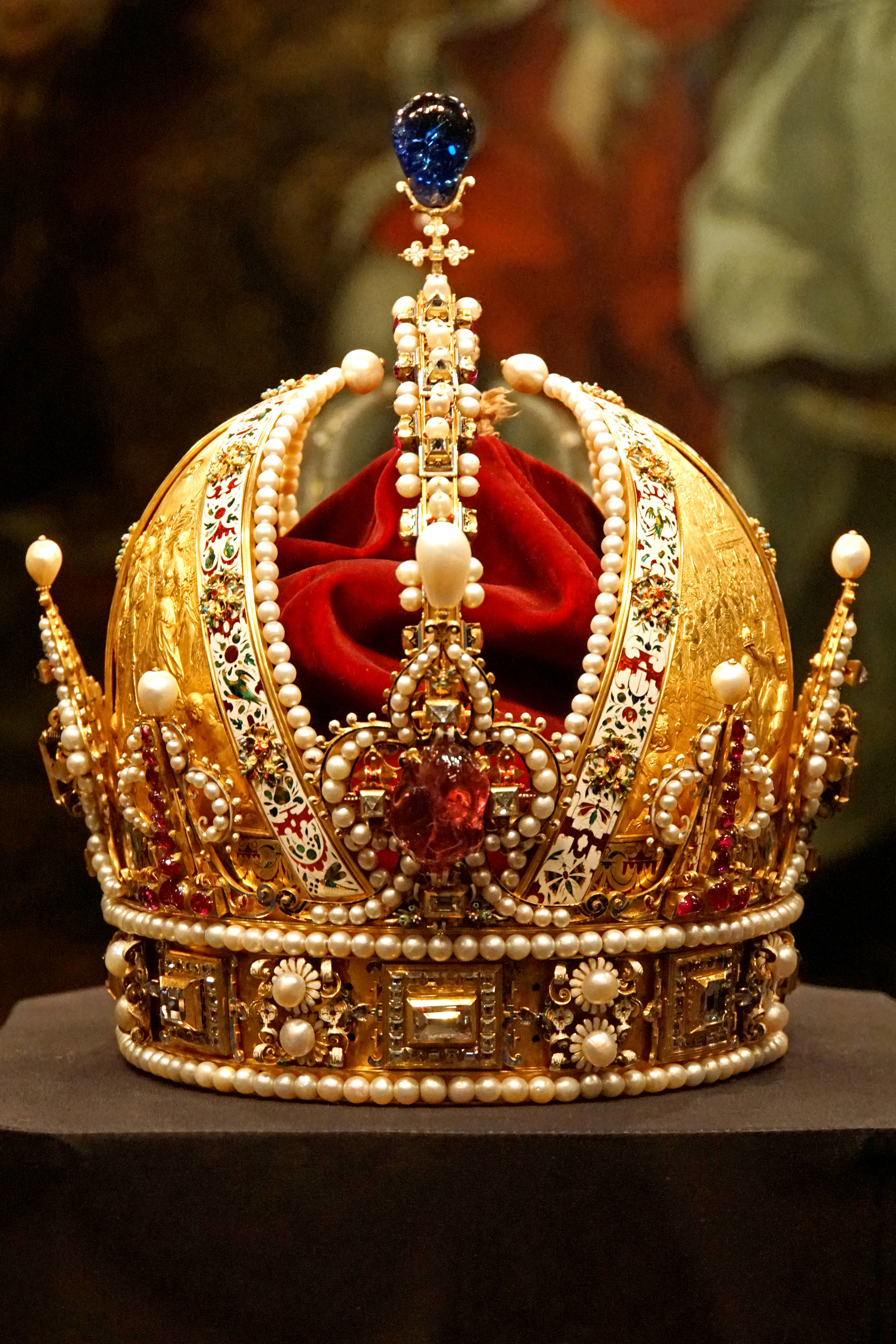
Imperial Crown

Among the most important regalia of the Austrian Empire are the following:

- The Crown of Rudolf II, later Crown of the Austrian Empire, (made by Jan Vermeyen in Prague in 1602). It is made of pure gold, partially enamelled and studded with diamonds, rubies, spinel rubies, sapphires, pearls, and cushioned with velvet.

The crown and the insignia of the Holy Roman Empire were kept at Nürnberg and were used only for coronation ceremonies. For all other occasions the emperors had to commission personal crowns, which (except for this one) have survived only in illustrations. This crown was originally the personal crown of emperor Rudolf II. It is one of the most important works of the European goldsmith's art. Luckily this personal crown was spared the fate of many other crowns and not broken up after the death of the emperor in 1612.

The Rudolphian crown has three distinct, principal elements, which symbolise the right to rule: the circlet with its fleurs-de-lis mounts in the shape of a royal crown (Rudolf II was the King of Bohemia and Hungary), the high arch descending from the imperial crown, and the golden mitre symbolising the divine right of the emperor to rule. The pearls run in rows like lights. The crown is topped by a bluish-green emerald which symbolises heaven.

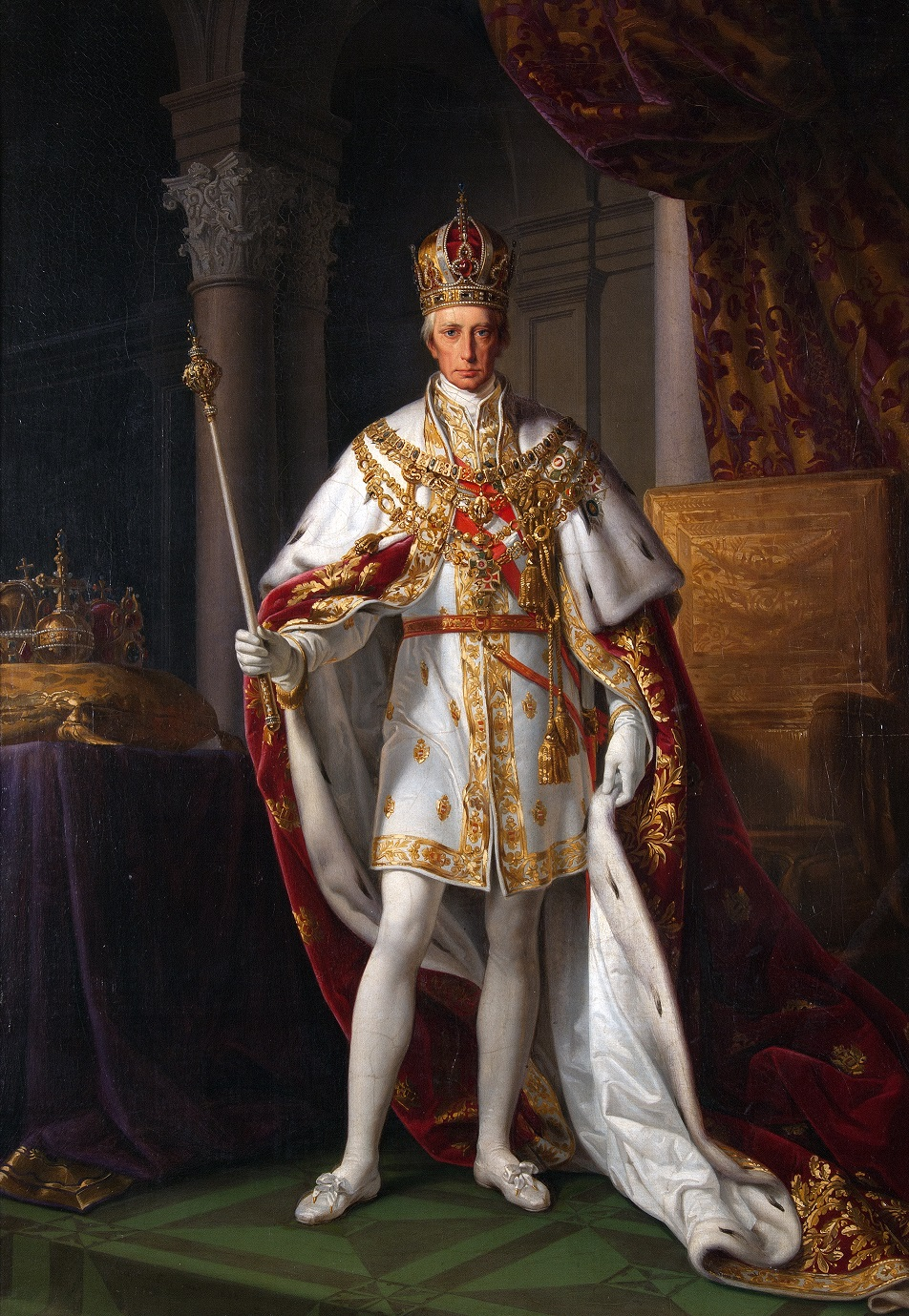
Emperor Francis I wearing the Imperial Mantle and regalia, c. 1830

In the four spherical triangles of the golden mitre, Rudolf is depicted in his four principal offices and titles: as victor over the Turks (Imperator), his coronation as Holy Roman emperor in Regensburg (Augustus), his ride up the coronation hill after his coronation as king of Hungary in Pozsony (in modern Slovak "Bratislava", in present-day Slovakia), and his procession at his coronation as king of Bohemia in Prague. The inscription inside the arch reads: RVDOLPHVS II ROM[ANORVM] IMP[ERATOR] AVGVSTUS HVNG[ARIAE] ET BOH[EMIAE] REX CONSTRVXIT MDCII (tr. "Rudolf II, Emperor of the Romans, Augustus, King of Hungary and Bohemia, made this in 1602").

The choice and number of the stones used have allegorical and mystical significance. Eight diamonds decorate the crown: eight is a holy number referring to the octagonal body of the imperial crown; the diamond is a symbol of Christ.

Under threat from Napoleon, emperor Francis II dissolved the thousand-year old Holy Roman Empire and proclaimed the Austrian Empire on August 11, 1804. He did not use the crown of the Holy Roman Empire but the old crown of Rudolf II as the crown of the new empire.

For more detailed information, see Imperial Crown of Austria.

- The Imperial Orb and Sceptre (made by Andreas Osenbruck in Prague, between 1612 and 1615) were commissioned by emperor Matthias, the successor to Rudolf II. Both insignia were made out of the same material as the crown, and followed the same concept. They are also partially enameled, and studded with rubies, sapphires and pearls.
- The Mantle of the Austrian Empire (designed by Philipp von Stubenrauch (1784–1848) and executed by Johann Fritz, Master Gold Embroiderer, in Vienna in 1830) was commissioned by emperor Francis I for the coronation of his son, Ferdinand, as younger King of Hungary. The mantle is made out of red velvet, ermine, and white silk, and pranked with a gold-embroidered scatter pattern formed of double eagles with the Austrian arms. The border is decorated with oak and laurel leaves.
- The Coronation Robes of the Kingdom of Lombardy–Venetia (also designed by Philipp von Stubenrauch and executed by Johann Fritz in Vienna in 1838) are patterned similar to the Mantle of the Austrian Empire, but made out of blue and orange velvet, with white moiré, gold and silver embroidery, ermine and lace. The edging of the mantle is accompanied by a line of medallions in which the Iron Crown of Lombardy is displayed. Parallel to this runs a broad ornamental border composed of sprays of palm fronds, oak and laurel leaves.

After Napoleon's downfall and the Congress of Vienna, the Kingdom of Lombardy–Venetia was created under Austrian rule. When emperor Ferdinand I was to be crowned King of Lombardy and Venetia in Milan on 6 September 1838, the question arose as to the choice of appropriate insignia and coronation vestments. Only the Iron Crown already existed. The rest of the insignia and vestments had to be newly commissioned. When the Austrians were forced to withdraw from Italy in 1859, the vestments were brought to Vienna.

== Habsburg-Lorraine Household Treasure ==
The Household Treasure contains items from the daily life of the Habsburg monarchs. The collection is vast and only a few highlights are featured regularly.

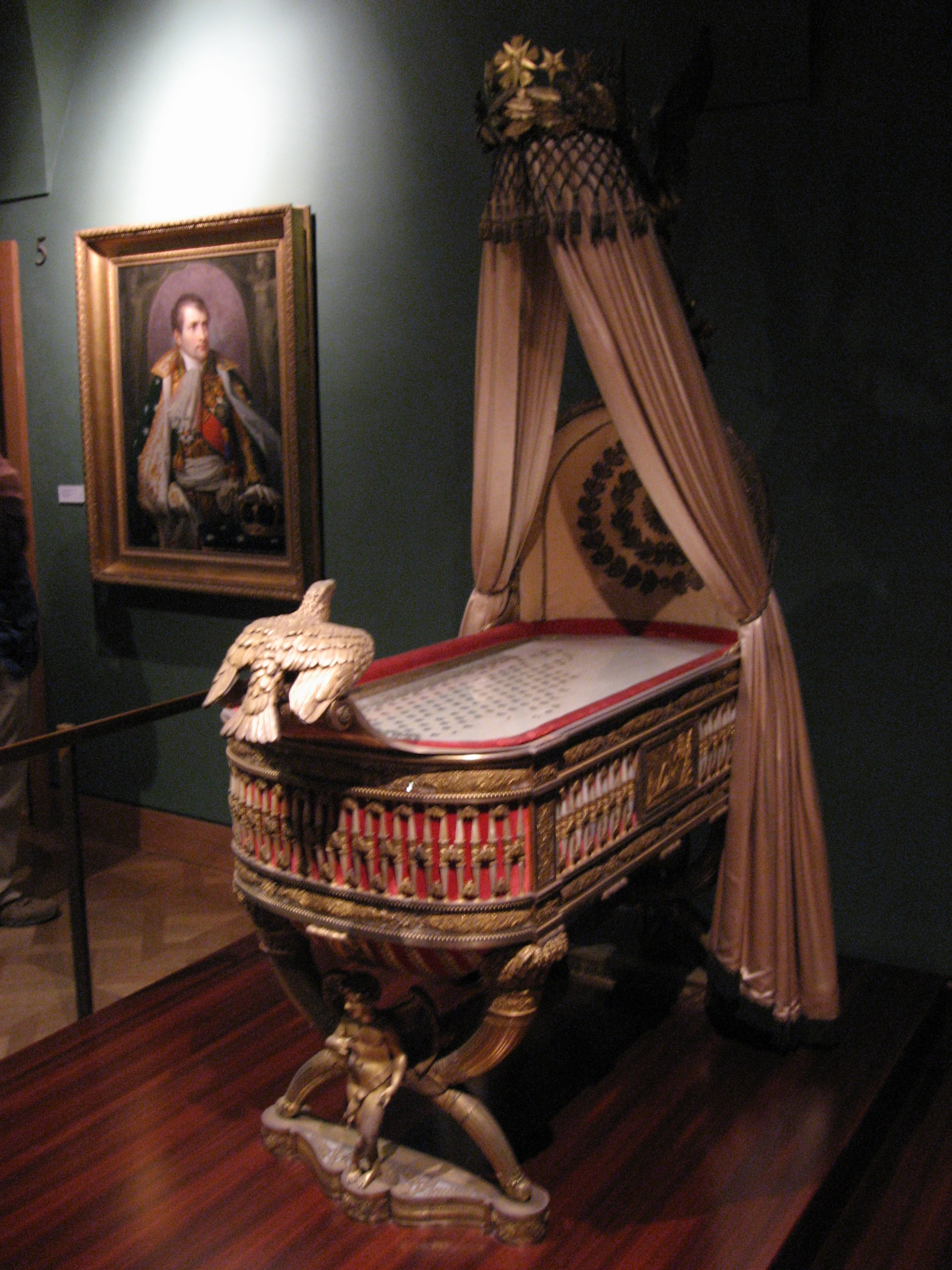
Cradle of the King of Rome

The Cradle of the King of Rome was commissioned by the city of Paris as a gift to Napoleon and his wife Empress Marie-Louise, on the birth of their son Napoleon II. It was built by Pierre-Paul Prud'hon, Henri-Victor Roguier, Jean-Baptiste-Claude Odiot and Pierre-Philippe Thomire in Paris in 1811. The cradle is silver-gilt, and decorated with gold, mother-of-pearl, copper plates covered with velvet, silk and tulle with gold and silver embroidery, and signed on two of the feet: Odiot et Thomire and Thomire et Odiot. Angels hold a little baldachin over the head, and a bird sits at the foot. Bees, the symbol of the Bonaparte dynasty, decorate the sides. The cradle was more a horizontal throne with all its splendour, and a more practical cradle was also commissioned, which is in the Louvre today.

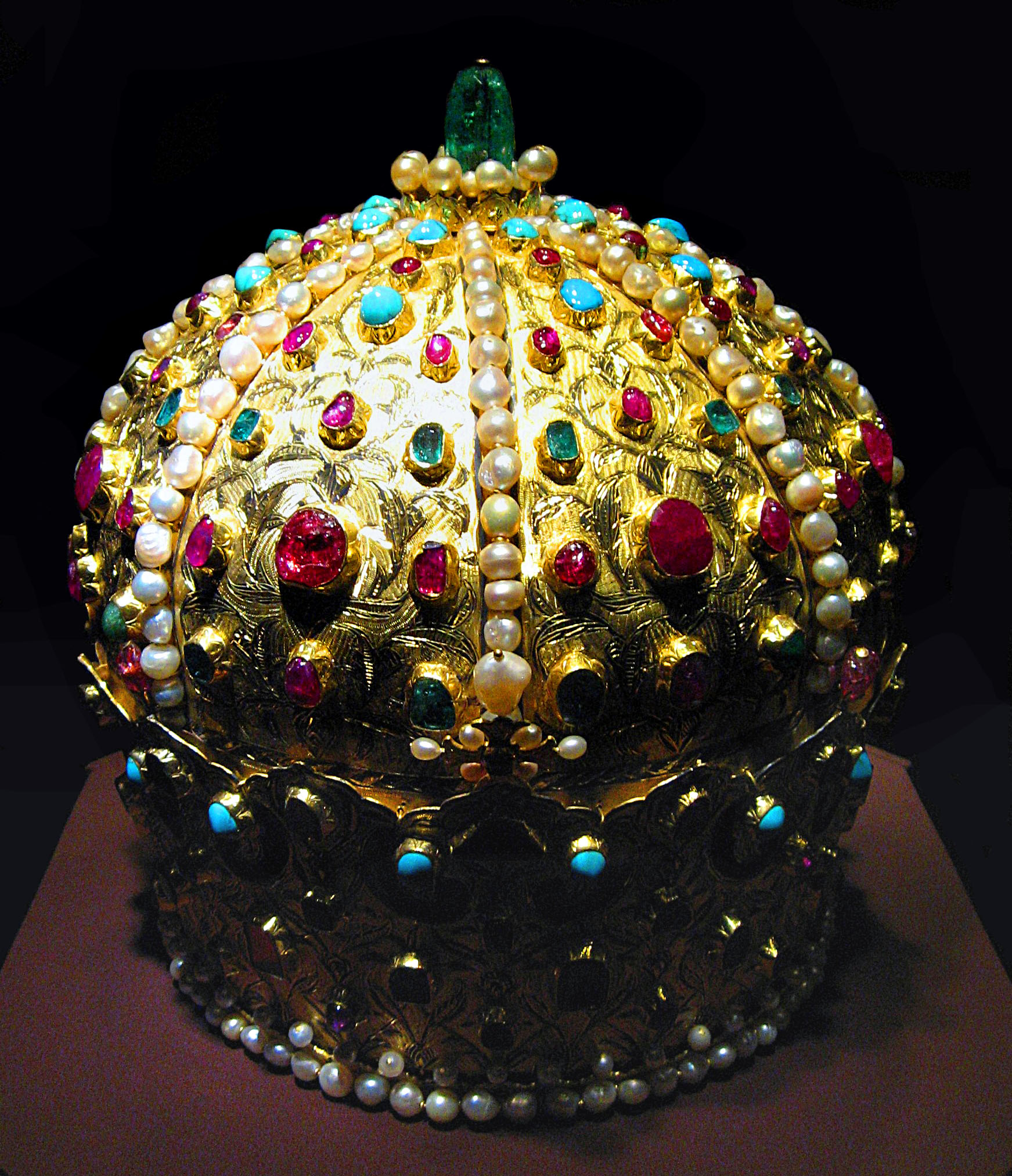
Crown of Stephen Bocskai, Imperial Treasury, Hofburg Palace, Vienna

Another notable item listed in the Household Treasure is the Crown of István Bocskay. This Transylvanian prince sided with the Ottoman Turks during their wars with the Habsburg empire. As a sign of their gratitude, the Ottomans sent him a crown, probably a Persian production from the 17th century. After his death, it was brought to Vienna in 1609. It is made out of gold, studded with precious stones and pearls, and laid in with silk. As crowns were not in use in the Ottoman Empire, it was modeled after the Byzantine kamelaukion (closed bonnet-like headdress), similar to those used in the Orthodox church. The crown has two main parts: a broad circlet with a wreath of fleurs-de-lis and a closed, spherical helmet rising from it. The frontal lily bears a Greek cross.

More items are:

- Precious christening table clothes, robes, candles.
- Golden baptismal ewers and basins from Spain.
- An emerald Unguentarium commissioned by emperor Ferdinand II and produced in Prague in 1641 by Dionysio Miseroni. It is made out of a single piece of 2,680 carats (536 g) emerald, and enamelled with gold.
- Precious stones such as the Hyacinth "La Bella", and jewelry.

== Insignia of the Holy Roman Empire ==
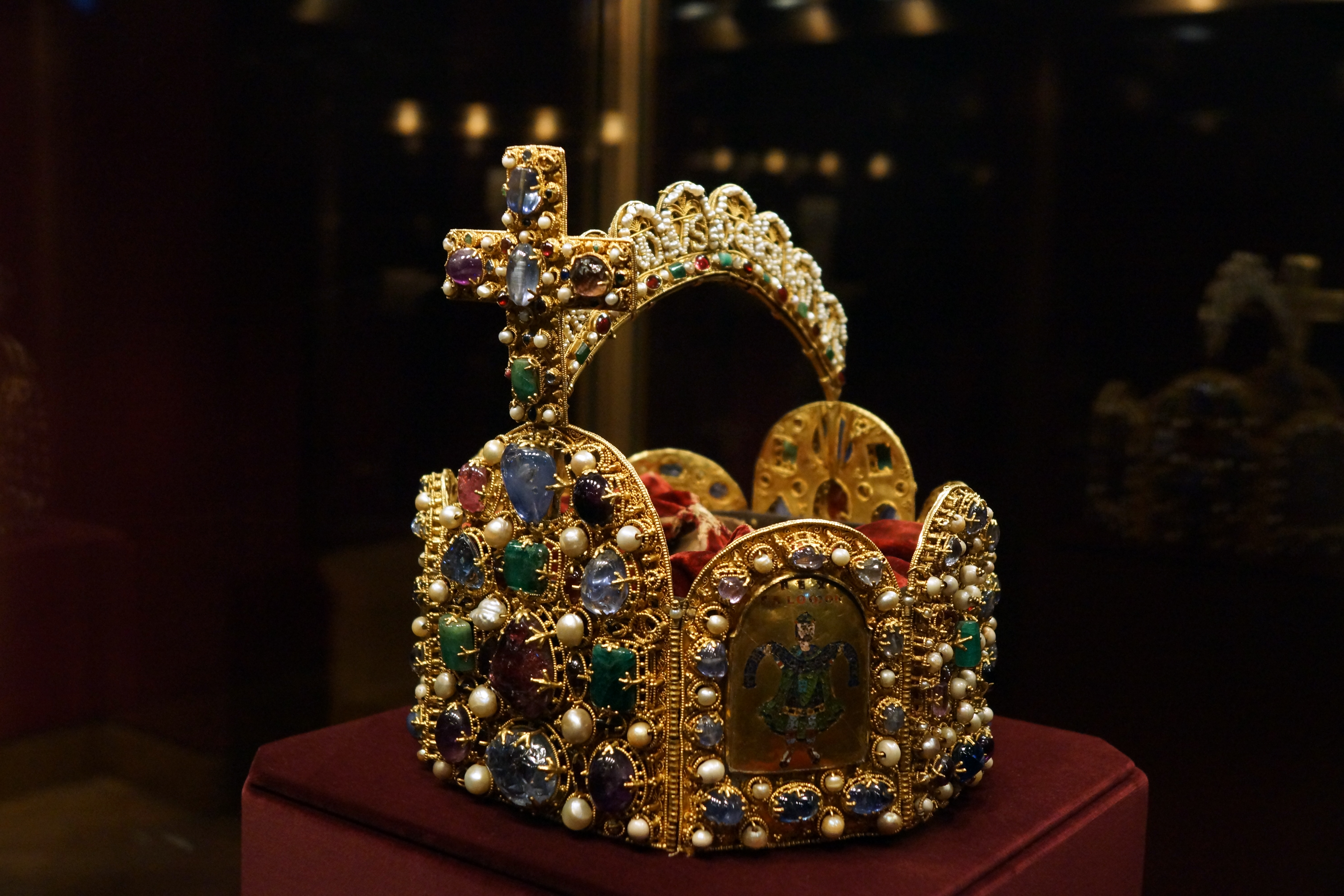
Imperial Crown of the Holy Roman Empire, Imperial Treasury, Vienna

The Imperial Regalia are the insignia of the Holy Roman Empire. After 1438, the Holy Roman Empire was ruled by the House of Habsburg, with only one brief exception. From 1508, after his election, the German King no longer called for the coronation by the Pope either, but considered himself Roman emperor directly. The crown was probably used for the first time for the coronation of Konrad II; the last time was for Franz II in 1792.

The regalia were normally kept in Nuremberg, and a smaller part in Aachen. However, with the advance of the French in the French Revolutionary Wars, they were taken away in 1796 and brought to Vienna for safety. They have remained in the Schatzkammer ever since, even after the dissolution of the Holy Roman Empire in 1806. The cities of Aachen and Nuremberg tried many times, unsuccessfully, to reclaim the regalia. The regalia briefly left Vienna after the erstwhile Anschluss, when Hitler had them sent to Nuremberg in 1938. After the war they were found by American troops in a bunker and eventually returned in 1946.

The regalia are made up of many pieces, some of which are more than a thousand years old. It is one of the most important and complete collections of medieval royal regalia. Some of the most important items are listed below:

- Imperial Holy Bible
- St. Stephen's Purse
- Sword of Charlemagne
- Imperial Crown
- Imperial Cross
- Holy Lance
- Imperial Sword
- Imperial Orb
- Coronation Mantle
- Ceremonial Sword
- Imperial Sceptre
- Vestments
- Reliquaries

== Burgundian Inheritance and Order of the Golden Fleece ==
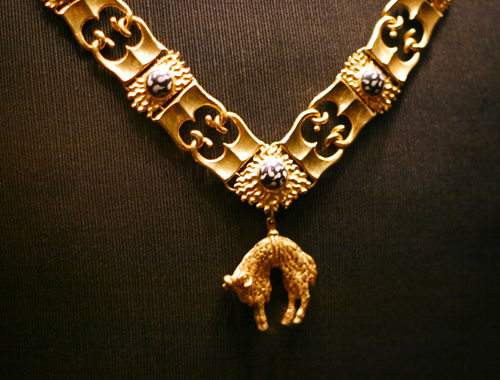
Neck Chain of a Knight of the Order of the Golden Fleece

- The Burgundian Inheritance are the items that are still left of the once-immense treasure of the dukes of Burgundy. It includes a precious pomp goblet that was created for Duke Philip the Good of Burgundy (ruled 1419–1467). It is set with gold and crafted out of single piece of rock-crystal.
- The Order of the Golden Fleece was one of the most prestigious orders in the Middle Ages and still exists today, alongside the Order of the Garter. The current head of the Order is Felipe VI. It was founded by Duke Philip the Good and Princess Isabella of Portugal in 1430. The Legend of the Golden Fleece goes back to antiquity, a well-known Greek myth, according to which Jason and the Argonauts stole the Golden Fleece from Colchis.

The collection houses various items of the Order, such as neck chains of the knights, the Potence (Chain of Arms) of the Herald of the order, the liturgical vestments, altars, etc.

== Ecclesiastical Treasury ==
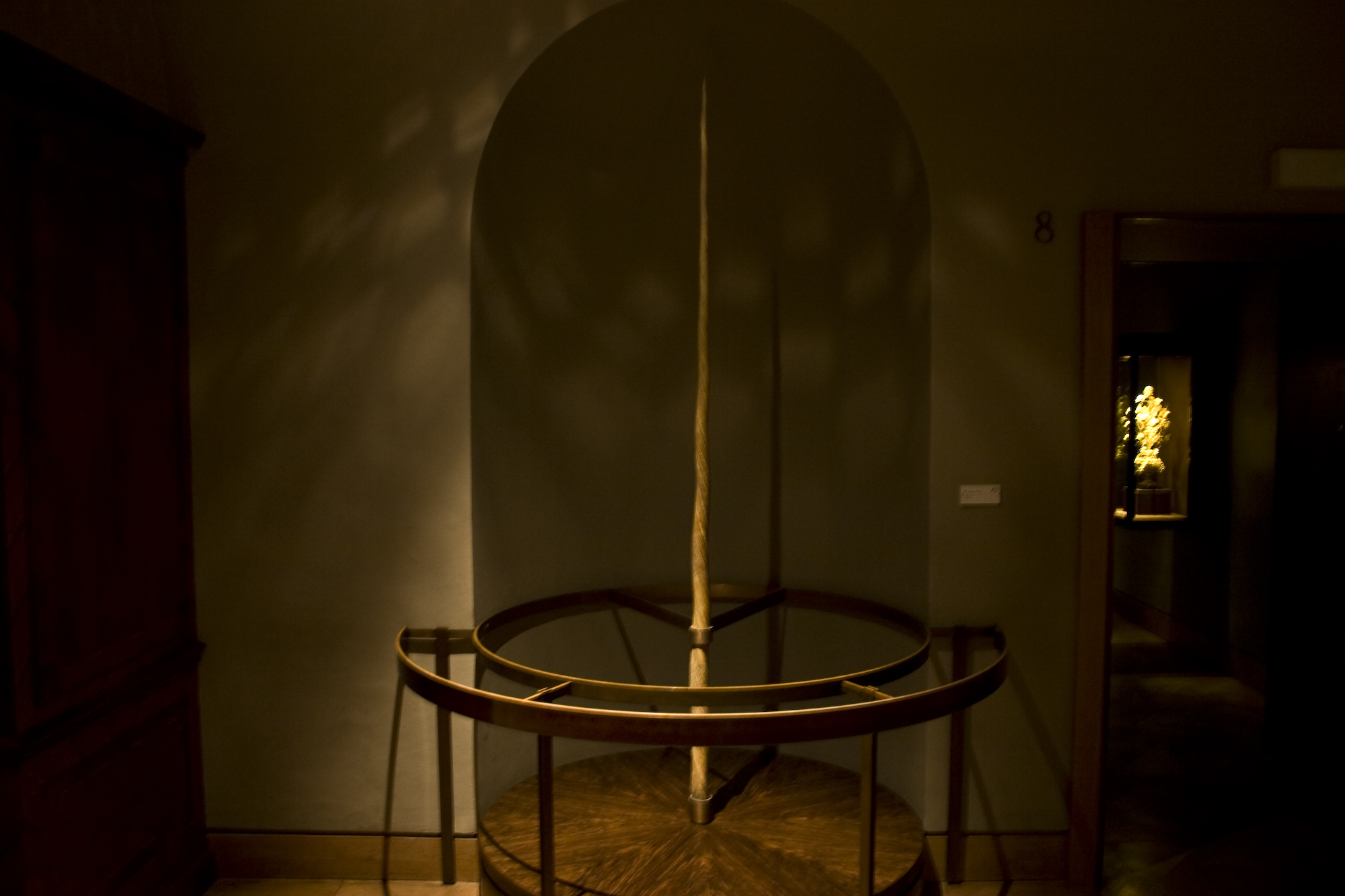
The Ainkhürn (horn of a unicorn)

The Ecclesiastical Treasury (Geistliche Schatzkammer) contains various pieces such as crosses, altars, reliquaries, icons, holy statues, and other items that were used for prayer by the court and the Habsburgs. The collection is vast, so only a limited number of items are on permanent exhibition, the rest are shown in cycles.

- The Reliquary Cross of King Louis I of Hungary is a double-cross made out of gold with silver-gilt, enamel, and precious stones. In it, pieces of the True Cross of Christ are said to be preserved under rock-crystal. This reliquary cross used to belong to King Louis of Hungary, and was probably produced either in Hungary or Naples, probably between 1370 and 1382.
- The House Altar of Jasper was made by Ottavio Miseroni in Prague, probably around 1620.
- The Reliquary with a Nail from the Cross was made in Augsburg in the mid-17th century.
- The Feather Picture of the Virgin Mary was made by the Purépecha Indian artist Juan Baptiste Cuiris in Michoacán (Pátzcuaro), Mexico, around 1550–1580. It is a picture of the Virgin Mary, made completely out of sparkling Hummingbird and parrot feathers. The Mexican Indian artists from Amentaca were famous for their traditional skills in producing art out of feathers. There are all in all seven feather-pictures in the treasury, making it the largest collection of such specific items. It belonged to the collection of Emperor Rudolf II.
- The Ainkhürn (horn of a unicorn) was originally thought to be the horn of a unicorn and was considered more valuable than gold, since magical healing powers were ascribed to it. The hilt of a sword was made from it, as well as a tankard. In reality, the horn probably came from a Narwhal.
- The Agate Bowl (Achatschale) is a bowl whose inscriptions are said to refer to Jesus Christ. It was at one time regarded as the Holy Grail.

== Others ==
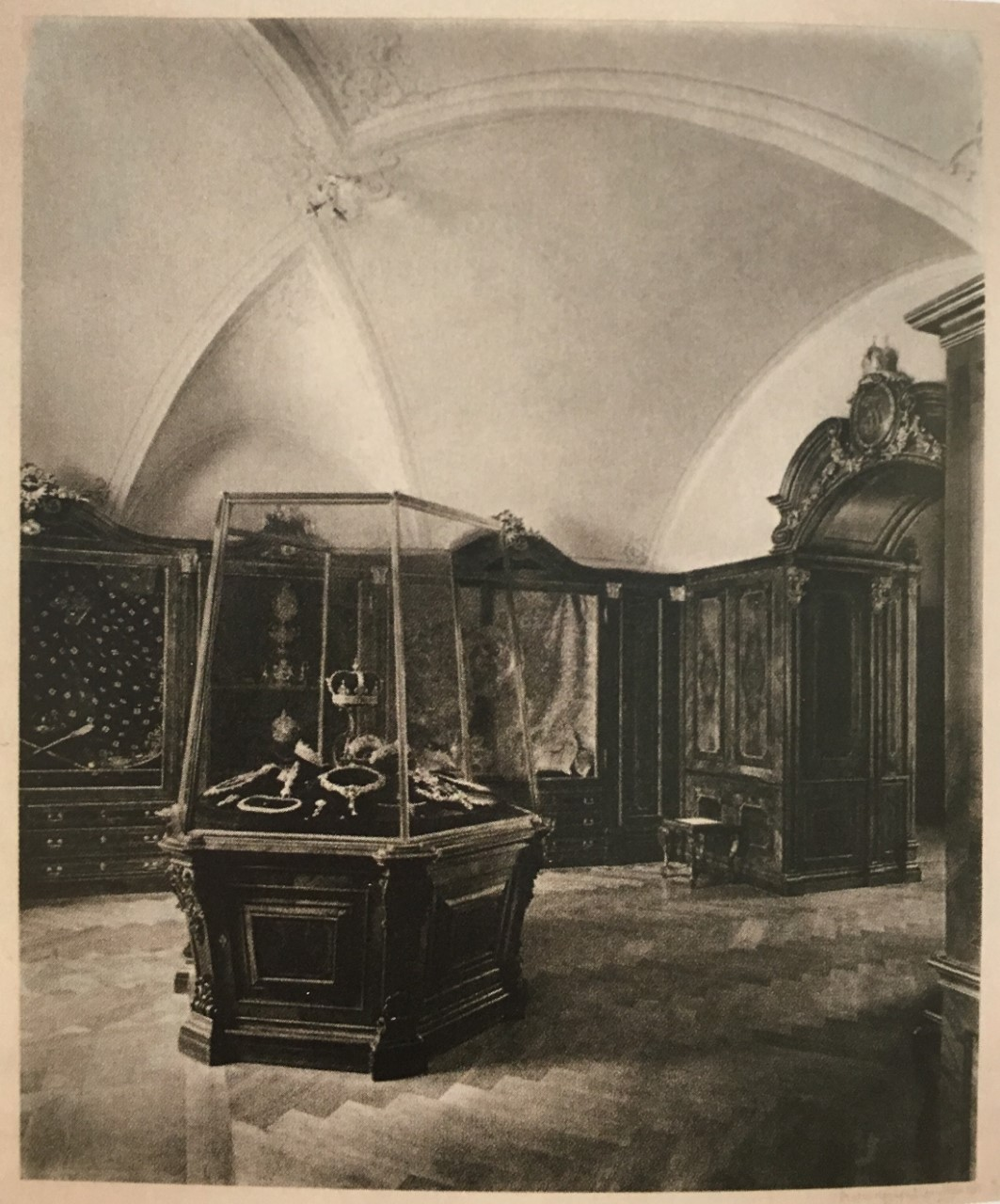
Imperial Treasury with display case XIII with parts of the crown jewels that are missing since 1918

Various pieces were personal items of members of the imperial family such as jewellry, necklaces, and tiaras. Many of these were kept in the Imperial Treasury as well but some items were taken out after 1918, such as the Florentine Diamond.

== See also ==
- Bohemian crown jewels
- Hungarian crown jewels
- Wittelsbach Diamond
