= Coronation cloak =

One of the imperial regalia of the Holy Roman Empire

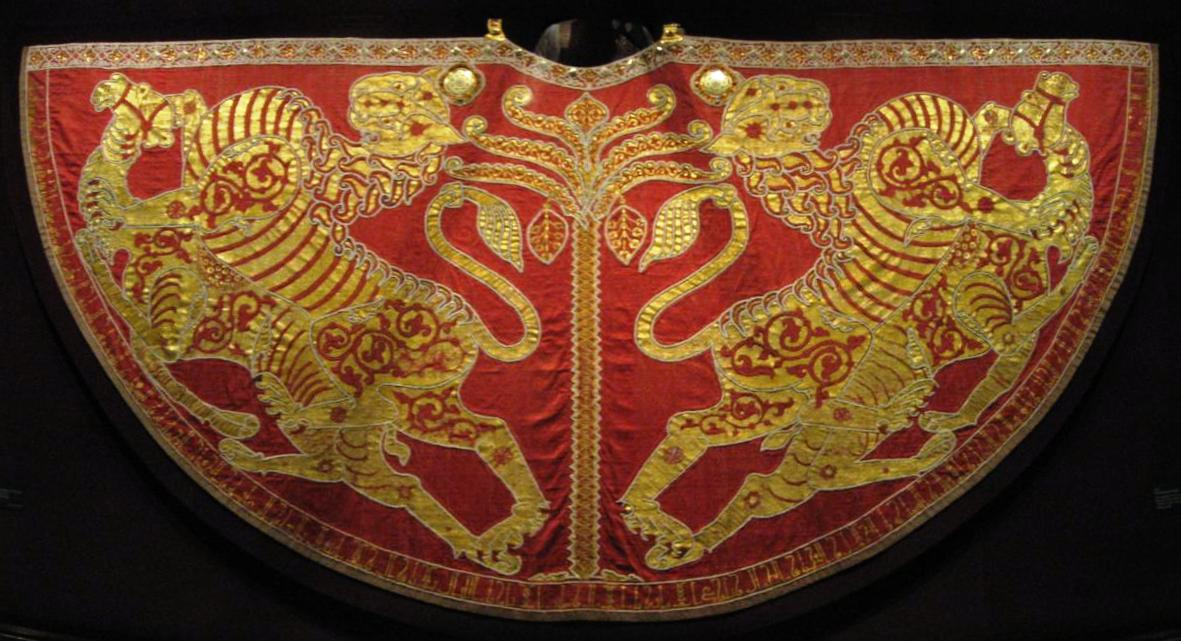
The Coronation Mantle, today in the Secular Treasury of the Vienna Hofburg

The Coronation cloak or pluviale (Latin for mantle) was one of the Imperial Regalia of the Holy Roman Empire and was the main piece of the coronation regalia of the Roman-German emperors.

The Arab-Norman work from a 12th-century Sicilian workshop was used for most coronations of the Roman-German emperors from the 13th century until the end of the old empire. The mantle is on display today in the Imperial Treasury of the Vienna Hofburg, together with the other coronation insignia such as the imperial crown, imperial sword and imperial orb.

== Shape, ornamentation and symbolism ==
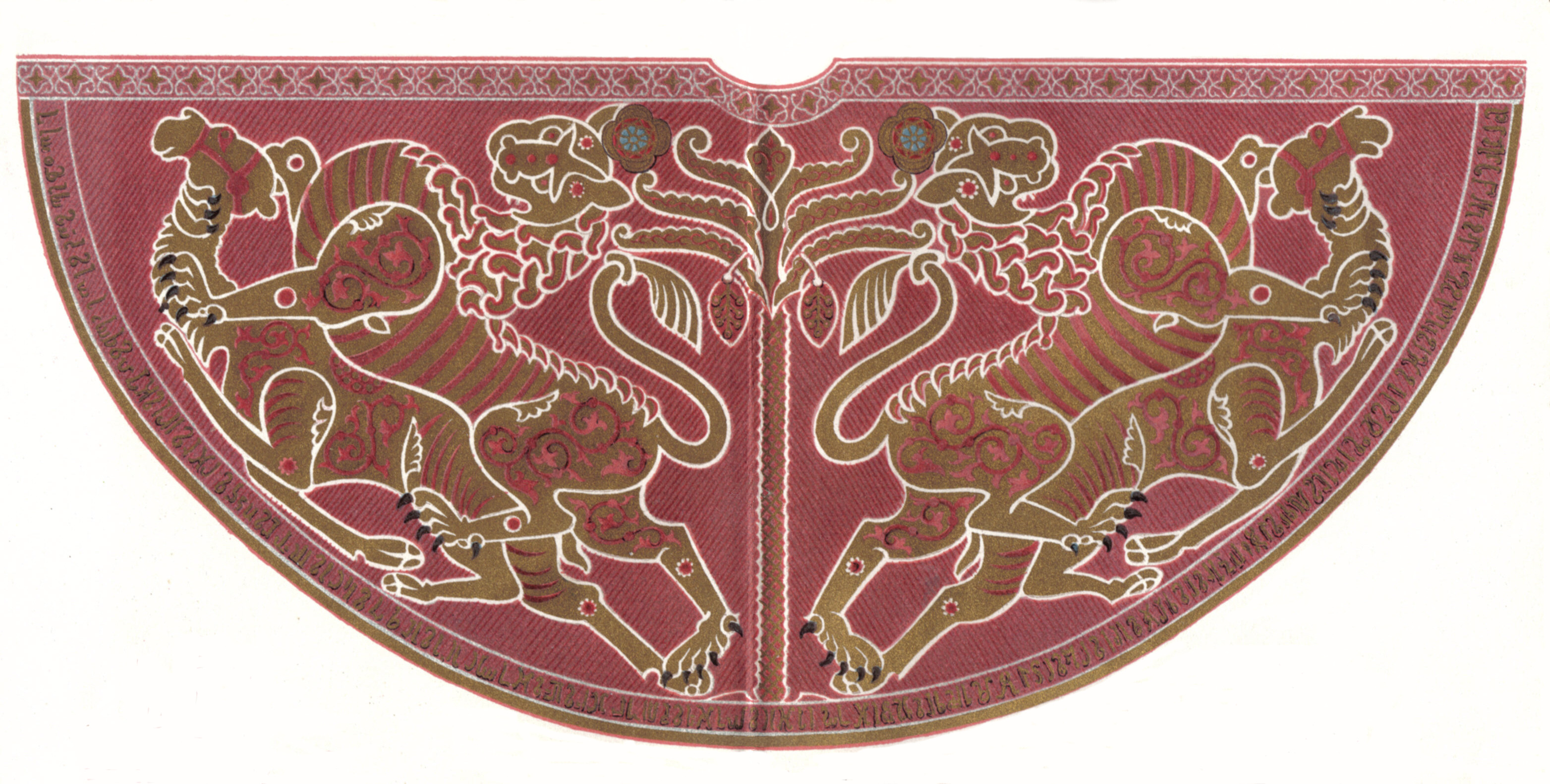
Detailed description of the coronation mantle in Meyers Konversations-Lexikon from 1893

The outer shape of the coronation mantle reflects the various cultural influences that shaped 12th century Sicily: those of Latin and Greek-Byzantine Christianity and Islam. The pleasure of stylizing ornamentation played an important role in the sense of style of both the Arab-Muslim population group and the Norman conquerors.

The coronation mantle is a semi-circular, open cloak that reaches down to the ground. It was worn on both shoulders in the manner of a choir robe. It is 342 centimetres wide, made of red silk dyed with Indian redwood and kermes, the so-called samite, and is richly embroidered with gold threads, over 100,000 pearls and enamel plates. The cloak weighs a total of eleven kilograms.

The ornamental embroidery is a manifestation of royal power: two lions depicted in mirror image, each striking a camel. Between the two lions is a stylized palm tree in the style of a tree of life. The originally ancient oriental motifs were borrowed from Islamic art. The exact meaning of the motif is not clear. What is known is that the lion was often used to represent the power of the ruler and was the heraldic animal of the Hauteville, the Norman royal dynasty of Sicily. Most interpretations assume that the lions striking two camels symbolize the victory of the Normans over the Saracens, who had previously ruled Sicily. However, this is contradicted by the fact that the symbolic representation of the Arabs or Islam as a camel is not documented in medieval sources. Astrological connections have also occasionally been suspected. William Tronzo assumes that the embroidery is part of a Norman visual vocabulary and that the depiction on the cloak should therefore be interpreted as the camel being defeated by the lion as a symbol of bad rule.

Following the hem of the cloak is an embroidered Kufic inscription with good wishes for the wearer of the cloak. Although it is clearly legible, the translation and interpretation still raise questions that have not been fully answered. One possible translation is:

(This mantle) belongs to what has been worked in the royal workshop (ḫizāna), where happiness and honor, prosperity and perfection, merit and distinction have their seat, here in the royal workshop, which may enjoy good reception, splendid prosperity, great generosity and high splendor, fame and splendid endowment, and the fulfillment of wishes and hopes; Here, where the days and nights may pass in pleasure, without end and change; in the feeling of honor, attachment and encouraging participation in happiness and in the preservation of welfare, support and due activity; in the capital of Sicily in the year 528 of the Hejra.

The inscription is written in a form of Arabic rhyming prose, the Saj', which is mainly used in the Koran. The year 528 in the Islamic calendar corresponds to the year 1133 or 1134 in the Christian calendar.

The lining of the cloak is made of colorful Italian damask interwoven with gold and silver threads. It was apparently added to the cloak in the 16th century at the instigation of the council of the imperial city of Nuremberg, where the imperial regalia were kept at the time. The council decided to have the mantle relined for the coronation of Charles V in Aachen in 1520. This work was carried out in the Nuremberg convent of the Poor Clares.

The original lining, which consists of two parts, can still be found under this newer lining. The largest part of the inner mantle is covered by a silk fabric with strangely tiered ornaments, intertwined dragon bodies, birds, people, green tendrils and golden flowers on a shining gold background. Five pieces of gold brocade are sewn along the straight border, which were probably made at the same time as the rest of the cloak. Like the lion motif on the outside, the depictions on the original lining have not yet been satisfactorily interpreted.

== Significance of the mantle in the coronation ceremony ==
The donning of the mantle during the coronation ceremony was highly symbolic in the Middle Ages.The term investiture, which at that time referred to the introduction to a high ecclesiastical office or a new feudal estate, goes back to the Latin word investire for to clothe. Clothing a ruler in new, clerical vestments (paraments) not only made him stand out from the mass of subjects for all to see, but above all documented his transition from the secular to the clerical state. For medieval kingship had been surrounded by a strong sacred aura since Merovingian times. The semicircular shape of the mantle derived from the clerical liturgical garment, the cope.

In an era still largely devoid of writing and reliant on universally understood symbols, the donning of new vestments by the emperor or king documented his entry into the spiritual, sacred sphere. The donning of the coronation mantle was the climax of this part of the coronation ceremony. Only then were the insignia of his temporal power, such as the sceptre and imperial sword, bestowed upon him.

Even though the popes had long since denied secular rulers a priestly dignity since the time of Frederick II at the latest, the religious symbolism of the investiture remained of great importance to the laity.

== History ==
=== Origin and first mentions ===
Thanks to the embroidered inscription, the coronation mantle is one of the imperial regalia whose origin is largely certain. The Altdorf university professor Johann Heinrich Schulze first succeeded in translating the inscription in 1728. According to this, the mantle was created in the year 528 of the Islamic calendar. This corresponds to the year 1133/34 of the Gregorian calendar. Therefore, the not infrequently used term coronation mantle of Roger II is incorrect, as it links the first owner with the later function. Roger II was crowned king in 1130 - before the mantle was made.

Roger II of Sicily, from the Norman Hauteville dynasty, was a patron of the arts and literature. He gathered Arab and Byzantine scholars, poets and artisans at his court in Palermo. The cloak was probably made in the famous royal workshop for Roger, where the Norman kings of Sicily traditionally had their representative jewelry made. The court workshops located in the king's palace or in its immediate vicinity, the Nobiles Officinae, comparable to the Islamic Tiraz workshops, formed a unique production site for works of treasure art. The works from this workshop feature a wealth of materials and an astonishing variety of motifs from a wide range of cultures.

This diversity resulted from the ethnic composition of Sicily's population at the time, consisting of Latins, Greeks and Arabs, as well as from the coexistence of Roman Catholic, Greek Orthodox, Muslims and Jewish believers. All of these ethnic and religious groups were represented in the royal workshops. The Greek-Byzantine craftsmen created goldsmiths' work and textiles. Work with ivory, bronze casting and embroidery were the domain of Saracen artists. In the architecture of this period, the cooperation between these population groups is visible in the Arab-Byzantine-Norman architectural style.

The precious red silk fabric was probably imported from Byzantium. According to a report by Otto of Freising, Byzantine silk weavers first came to Sicily in 1147, having been captured during an advance of the Sicilian fleet to Greece. The various fabrics used in the cloak are, on the whole, outstanding achievements in the art of weaving, which also feature rich figurative depictions.

It is not known whether and on what occasions Roger wore the cloak. No special ceremonial events have come down to us from the year the cloak was made. Although the design and the materials used suggest that it was created as a ceremonial garment, the magnificent piece is not mentioned in the sources of the Norman period.

=== Transfer to imperial ownership ===
Roger's daughter and heiress Constance of Sicily married the Roman-German Emperor Henry VI in 1186. Against the resistance of the population, the nobility and the Pope - Sicily was a papal fiefdom - he united the southern Italian territory with the Empire and had himself crowned King of Sicily in Palermo Cathedral in 1194.

He had the Norman crown treasure, the most famous piece of which is the coronation mantle, brought to Germany to the Hohenstaufen castle of Trifels in the Palatinate. It is said that 150 mules were needed for this transport. It is not certain whether the mantle reached Germany on this occasion, as it was never mentioned in sources before 1246.

As Henry VI's successor, Philip of Swabia may have worn the cloak for the first time at a coronation as Roman-German king. However, there is as little evidence for this as there is for the previously assumed use at the imperial coronation of Frederick II in Rome in 1220. More recent research assumes that Frederick wore the cloak with four nimbed eagles kept in Metz Cathedral on this occasion. The other pieces of imperial regalia from the Norman treasure - the shoes, the stockings and the alba - were probably used by Frederick on this occasion. He also had a pair of gloves made from red silk, which are now also part of the Imperial Regalia.

The cloak was first mentioned in the inventory of Trifels Castle in 1246 as an "imperial cloak with precious stones".

The fact that the mantle was strongly influenced by Islamic art and culture was no obstacle to its use at the coronation of the Christian Roman-German emperor. This probably had to do with its high material value and the splendid design, but above all with the color of the cloak. Because purple was already reserved for the emperor during the Roman Empire due to its rarity and preciousness.

Over the centuries, knowledge of the coat's origins was partially lost. In the German-language handover document of the imperial regalia to King Charles IV from 1350, the mantle is mentioned with the following description:

A red cloak of St. Charles with two robes of good stone, pearls and gold

This shows that both the coat and the imperial crown were wrongly attributed to Charlemagne, who was canonized in 1165.

=== Storage in Nuremberg ===
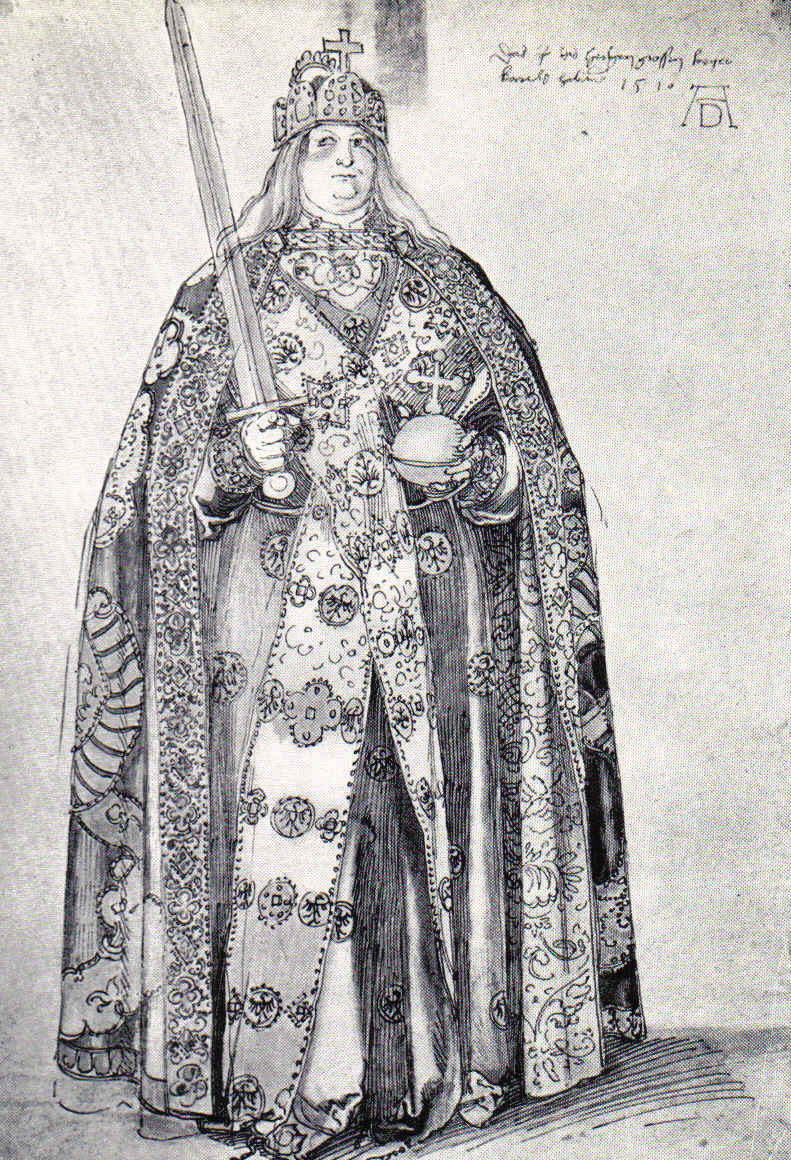
Sketch of the ideal image of Charlemagne with the imperial regalia, painted by Albrecht Dürer in 1513. The cloak is clearly visible.

The further history of the mantle is inextricably linked to that of the other Imperial Regalia.During the High and Late Middle Ages, the mantle was kept with these in various places in the Empire: first on the Trifels, later in Karlštejn Castle near Prague, then the main residence of the Luxembourg dynasty, or in the Imperial Abbey of Hersfeld.

In 1423, the Free Imperial City of Nuremberg was granted the privilege by the Roman-German King Sigismund of the House of Luxembourg to keep the Imperial Regalia for "eternal times, irrevocably and incontestably". This became necessary because the Hussite Wars meant that the former storage location in Prague was no longer safe. The imperial regalia were kept in a chest hanging in the choir of the Church of the Holy Spirit in Nuremberg until shortly before the end of the old empire. Once a year, they were publicly displayed at the so-called Heiltumsweisung.

On April 3, 1764, Joseph II was crowned Roman-German king in Frankfurt in the presence of his father, Emperor Franz I, while he was still alive. To mark the occasion, a second coronation mantle was made for Franz I, modeled on the first. The successful execution of this work is documented by an eyewitness account by Johann Wolfgang von Goethe in his work Dichtung und Wahrheit I,5:

The emperor's house regalia of purple silk, richly adorned with pearls and stones, as well as his crown, sceptre and orb caught the eye: for everything about it was new, and the imitation of antiquity tasteful.

However, Goethe was wrong to say that the crown was also a replica. On this occasion, Franz I wore the mitre crown of Emperor Rudolf II, which half a century later became the crown of the Austrian Empire.

=== Storage in Vienna ===
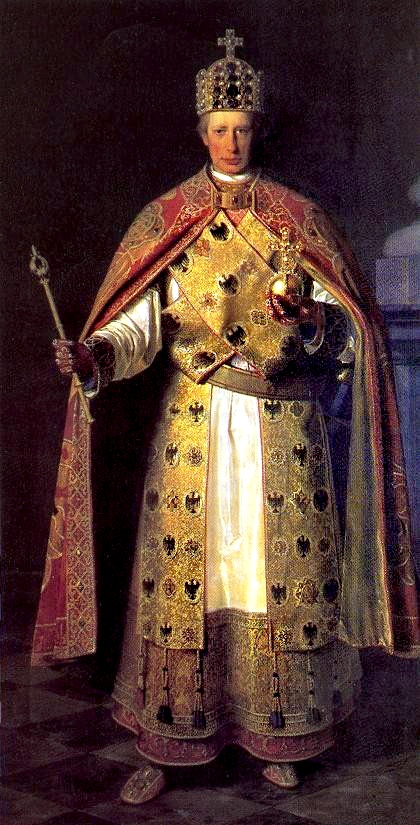
Emperor Franz II with the imperial insignia - coronation mantle in a painting by Ludwig Streitenfeld, 1874

In the course of the Coalition Wars that followed the French Revolution of 1789, Nuremberg was occupied by troops of General Jean-Baptiste Jourdan in 1796. In order to prevent the French conquerors from seizing the imperial regalia, the city council had already arranged for them to be transported to Regensburg, where they were handed over to the imperial commissioner at the Imperial Diet. The latter had them brought to Vienna in a secret operation in October 1800.

Shortly afterwards, Francis II, the last emperor of the Holy Roman Empire of the German Nation, also had the parts of the Imperial Treasure kept in Aachen brought to his residence city. In doing so, he wanted to prevent Napoleon Bonaparte from using them for his imperial coronation in 1804, thus lending his protectorate over the Confederation of the Rhine a legitimacy based on imperial traditions.

On the initiative of Nuremberg's Lord Mayor Willy Liebel, Adolf Hitler had the coronation mantle and the other imperial regalia moved to Nuremberg once again in 1938 in order to create a symbolic link to the then "City of the Nazi Party Rallies" and the ideas of a "Greater German Reich". After the Second World War, however, the American military government arranged for them to be returned to Vienna. Since 1946, they have once again been kept and exhibited in the Imperial Treasury of the Hofburg.

== Literature ==
- Hermann Fillitz: Die Insignien und Kleinodien des Heiligen Römischen Reiches. Schroll, Wien u. a. 1954.
- Ernst Kubin: Die Reichskleinodien. Ihr tausendjähriger Weg. Amalthea, Wien u. a. 1991, ISBN 3-85002-304-4.
- Karl-Heinz Rueß (Red.): Die Reichskleinodien. Herrschaftszeichen des Heiligen Römischen Reiches (= Schriften zur staufischen Geschichte und Kunst. Bd. 16). Gesellschaft für Staufische Geschichte, Göppingen 1997, ISBN 3-929776-08-1.
- Wilfried Seipel (Hrsg.): Nobiles Officinae. Die königlichen Hofwerkstätten zu Palermo zur Zeit der Normannen und Staufer im 12. und 13. Jahrhundert. Skira, Milano 2004, ISBN 3-85497-076-5.
