= Agate Bowl =

Coordinates: 48°12′24″N 16°21′56″E

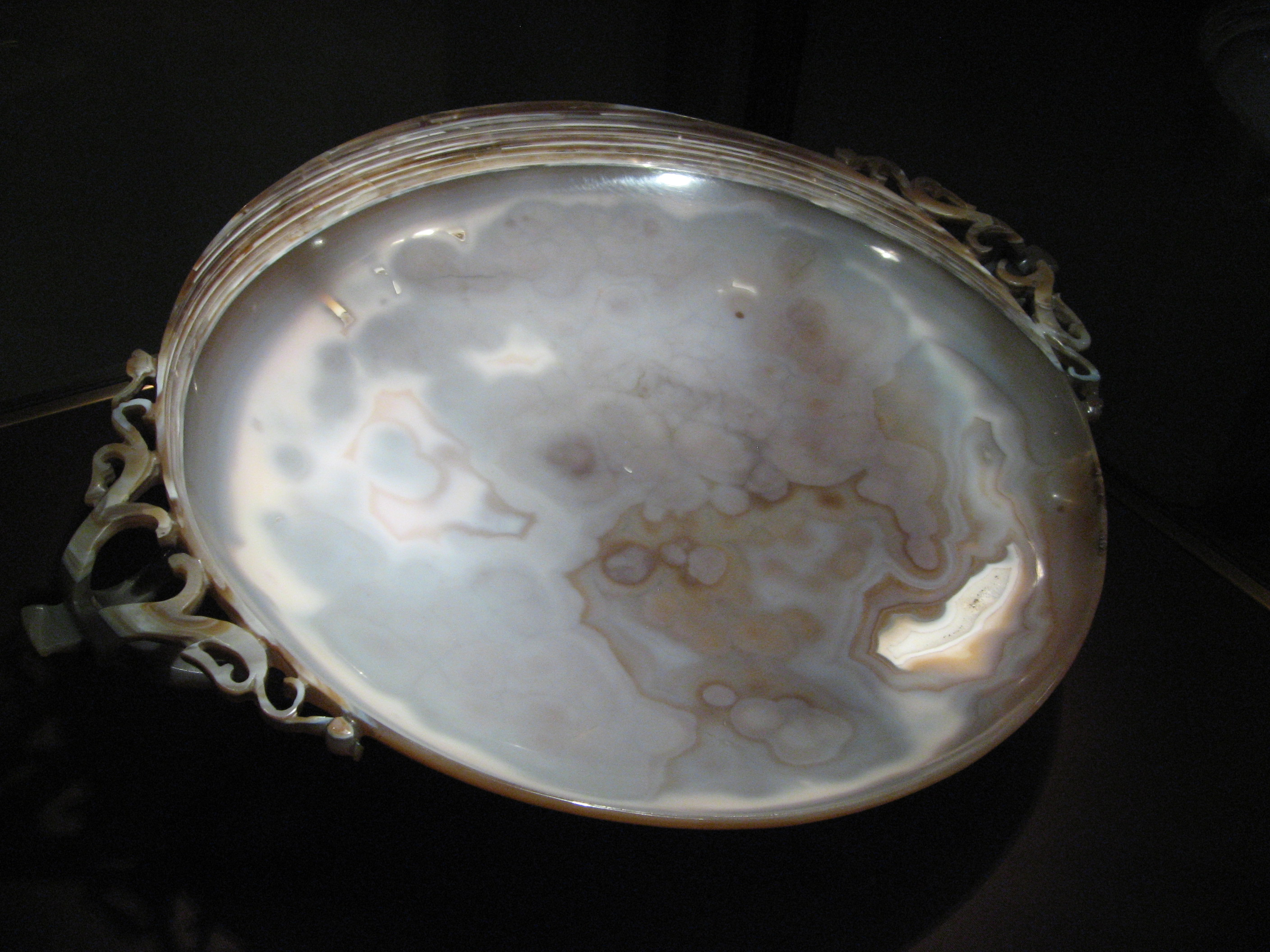
Agate Bowl, displayed in the Imperial Treasury at the Hofburg Palace in Vienna, Austria

The Agate Bowl (German: Achatschale) is a hardstone carving in the shape of a bowl cut out of a single piece of agate, possibly in the fourth century at the court of Constantine, and now displayed in the Imperial Treasury at the Hofburg Palace in Vienna, Austria. For centuries it was widely regarded as the "greatest masterpiece" and the "best and most important piece" in the collection. In 1564, Holy Roman Emperor Maximillian II and his brothers declared it by deed to be an "inalienable heirloom of the house of Austria". They valued this ancient precious stone carving, not just for its craftsmanship, but for a "natural miracle" in the stone itself that reveals a mysterious inscription—the name XRISTO (Christ) at the bottom of the bowl within the grain of the stone. It is now generally believed that the inscription inspired the legend that the bowl was the Holy Grail. The Agate Bowl is the largest carved stone bowl in the world.

== Description ==
The Agate Bowl is 76 cm (30 in) wide including the handles. The bowl is cut from a single, massive block of agate, the largest carved stone bowl in the world.

== History ==
The Agate Bowl dates from the fourth century and is believed to have been created at the court of Constantine. Its first documented reference is in a deed from 1564 written by Holy Roman Emperor Maximillian II and his brothers, declaring the bowl to be an "inalienable heirloom of the house of Austria", to be owned by the entire House of Habsburg. In 1619, an inventory of the estate of Holy Roman Emperor Matthias records, "the word KRISTO is to be seen in quite large letters in the nature of the stone".

From the seventeenth to the twentieth century, documented descriptions of an inscription B.XRISTO.RI.XXPP was seen as a reference to Jesus Christ. Because the writing seemed to be neither painted nor carved in the bowl, but appeared in the natural veining of the stone itself, the Agate Bowl was regarded a relic, even considered to be the Holy Grail.

In 1951, after the relic was restored, the inscription was reinterpreted by art historian Rudolf Egger to read ARISTO, the name of the stone cutter.
