= Imperial Treasury, Vienna =

Museum in Austria

Coordinates: 48°12′24″N 16°21′56″E

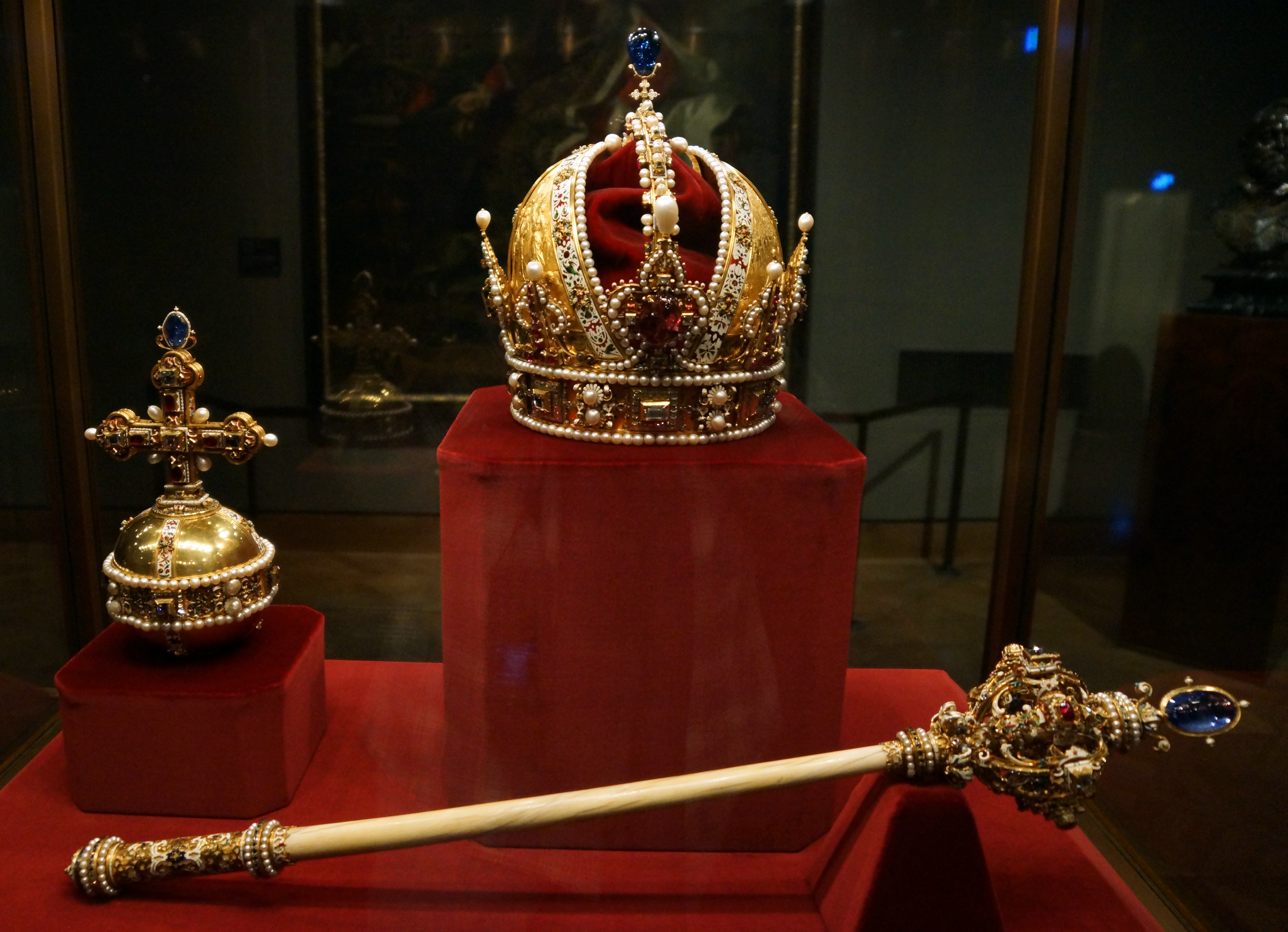
Imperial Crown, Orb, and Sceptre of Austria, kept in the Imperial Treasury at the Hofburg Palace in Vienna.

The Imperial Treasury (German: Kaiserliche Schatzkammer) at the Hofburg Palace in Vienna, Austria contains a valuable collection of secular and ecclesiastical treasures covering over a thousand years of European history. The entrance to the treasury is at the Schweizerhof (Swiss Courtyard), the oldest part of the palace, which was rebuilt in the sixteenth century in the Renaissance style under Holy Roman Emperor Ferdinand I. The Imperial Treasury is affiliated with the Kunsthistorisches Museum, and houses in 21 rooms a collection of rare treasures that were compiled by the Imperial House of Habsburg over the course of centuries, including the Imperial Crown, Orb, and Sceptre of Austria, and the Imperial Regalia of the Emperors and Kings of the Holy Roman Empire, including the Imperial Crown of the Holy Roman Empire.

The Imperial Treasury is divided into two collections: the secular collection and the ecclesiastical collection. The secular collection contains numerous imperial artifacts from the House of Habsburg, including jewels and precious stones that due to their unique size could not be fitted into the imperial crowns. Like all secular treasuries, it was designed to attest to the political power and geographical reach of their owners. The ecclesiastical collection contains numerous religious treasures, including relics and objects ascribed to the private ownership of saints.

== Secular collection ==
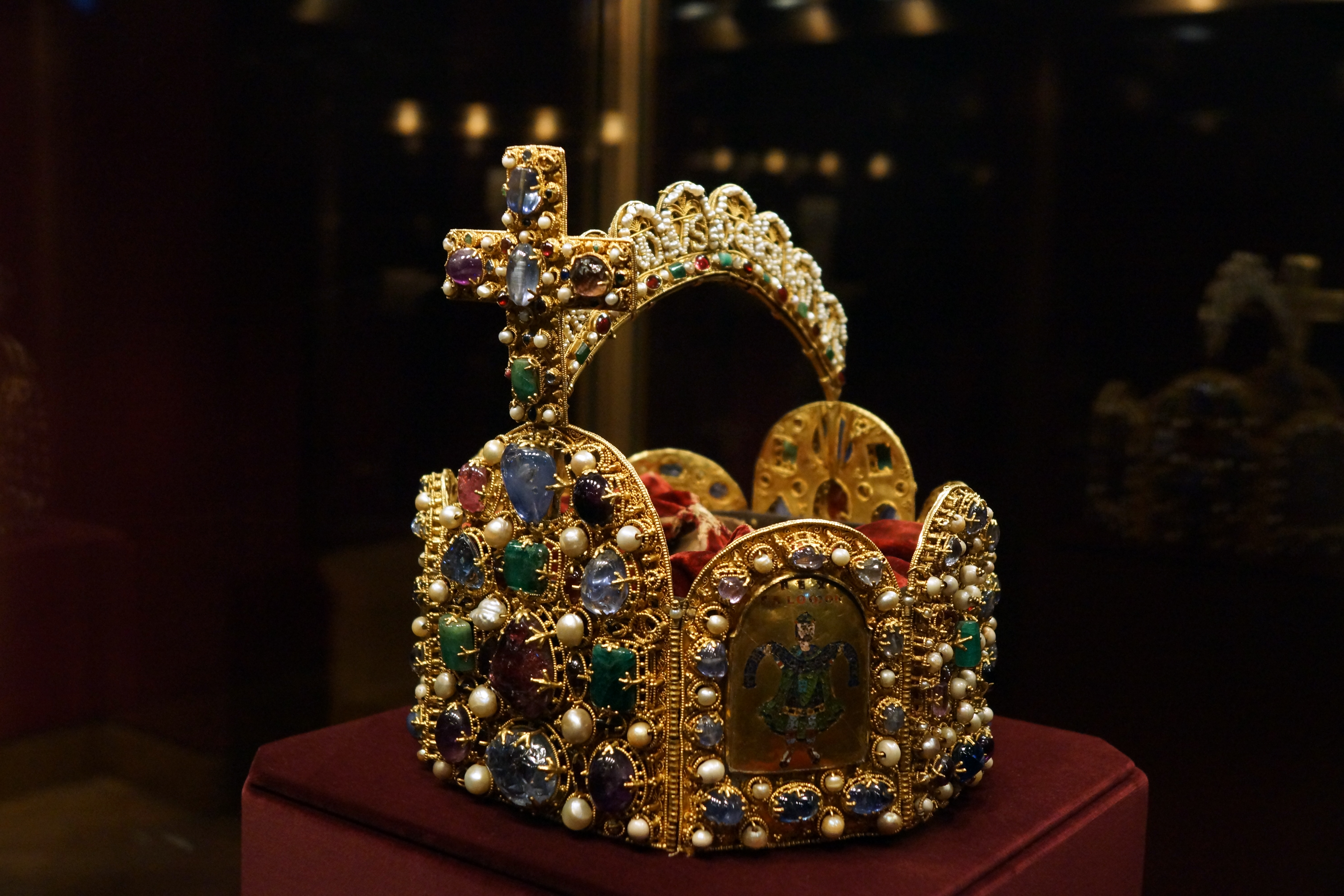
Imperial Crown of the Holy Roman Empire, kept in the Imperial Treasury at the Hofburg Palace in Vienna

The Imperial Treasury collections were set up from 1556 by the scholar Jacopo Strada, court antiquarian of Ferdinand I. In the eighteenth century, Maria Theresa had the Habsburg treasures moved to its present location, covering up the fact that the dynasty's assets had been largely affected by the expensive wars against rivaling Prussia. The Imperial Regalia arrived in the last days of the Holy Roman Empire around 1800 from Nuremberg, where they had been kept since 1424, in order to save them from the advancing French troops under Napoleon. After the Austrian Anschluss of 1938, the Nazi authorities took them back to Nuremberg. At the end of World War II, they were returned to Vienna by the US forces. The display was completely renovated in 1983–1987.

The Treasury is divided into two sections - secular and ecclesiastical. The secular museum contains a collection of royal objects:

- The Imperial Regalia (Reichskleinodien): insignia and jewels of the Holy Roman Empire, including the Imperial Crown, the Imperial Sceptre, and the Imperial Sword;
- The Austrian Crown Jewels, comprising the personal crown of Emperor Rudolf II, which with the proclamation of the Austrian Empire in 1804 became the Imperial Crown of Austria, with sceptre and globus cruciger, the regalia worn by Emperor Ferdinand I of Austria on the occasion of his coronation as King of Lombardy–Venetia in 1835, as well as the vestments and other precious items of the Order of Saint Stephen of Hungary and the Military Order of Maria Theresa;
- The regalia of the Archduchy of Austria with the cord casing of the archducal hat made for the coronation of King Joseph II in 1764;
- The Burgundian Treasury, part of the dowry of Mary the Rich at her wedding with Archduke Maximilian I in 1477.
- The original insignia of the Kingdom of Bohemia, the scepter and the orb.
- The treasury of the Order of the Golden Fleece from the heritage of Mary's father Duke Charles the Bold.

On display are various valuable gems, including one of the world's largest emeralds. Part of the treasury are also the crown of the Transylvanian prince Stephen Bocskay and the two "inalienable heirlooms of the House of Austria": a giant narwhal tooth which was thought to be the horn of a unicorn (Ainkhürn) and the Agate bowl from Late Antiquity which was thought to be the legendary Holy Grail; furthermore the Napoleonica artifacts of Napoleon II and his mother Marie Louise.

== Ecclesiastical collection ==
The ecclesiastical collection contains numerous devotional images and altars, mostly from the Baroque era.

== Gallery ==
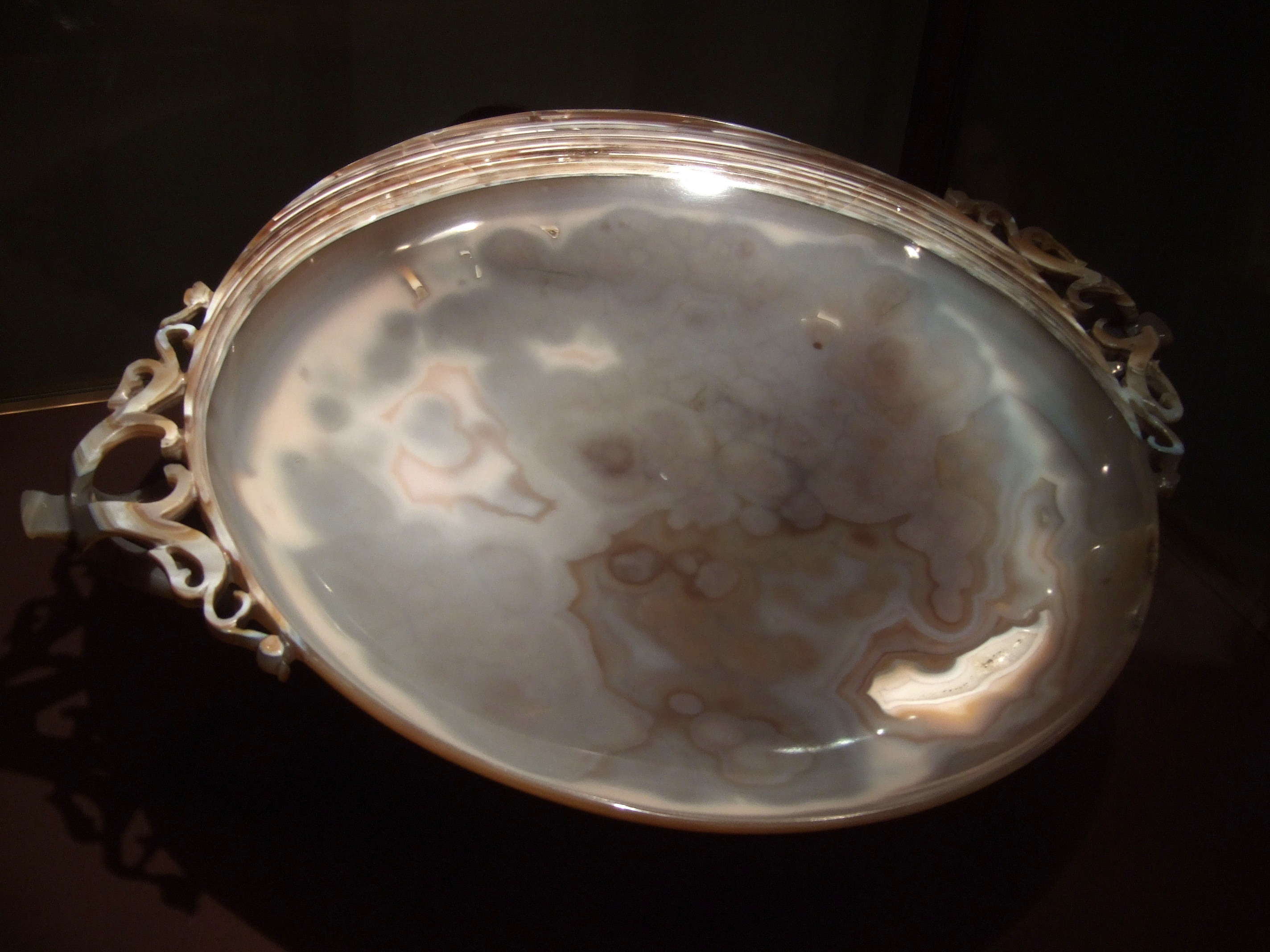
Agate bowl

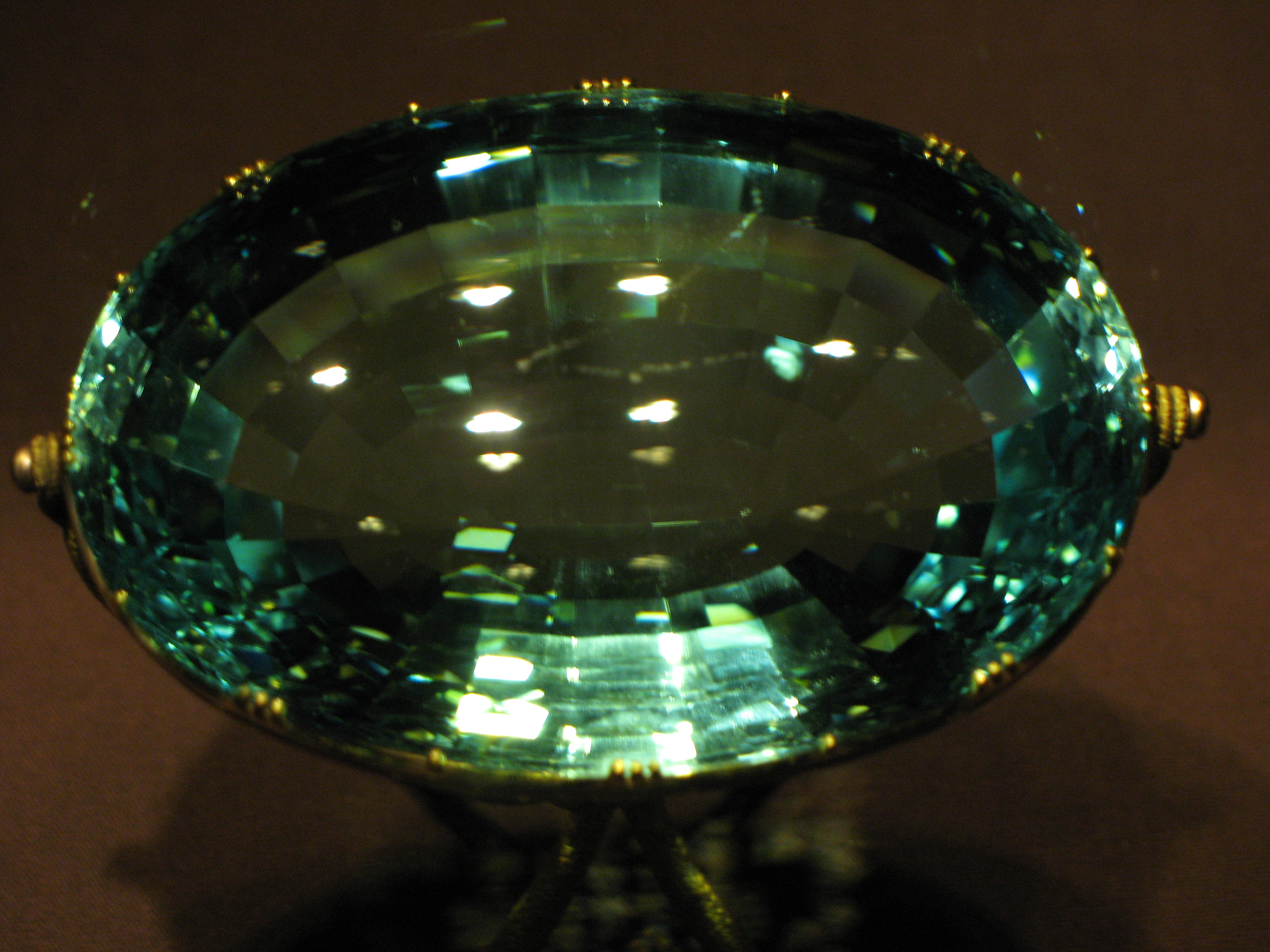
Aquamarine

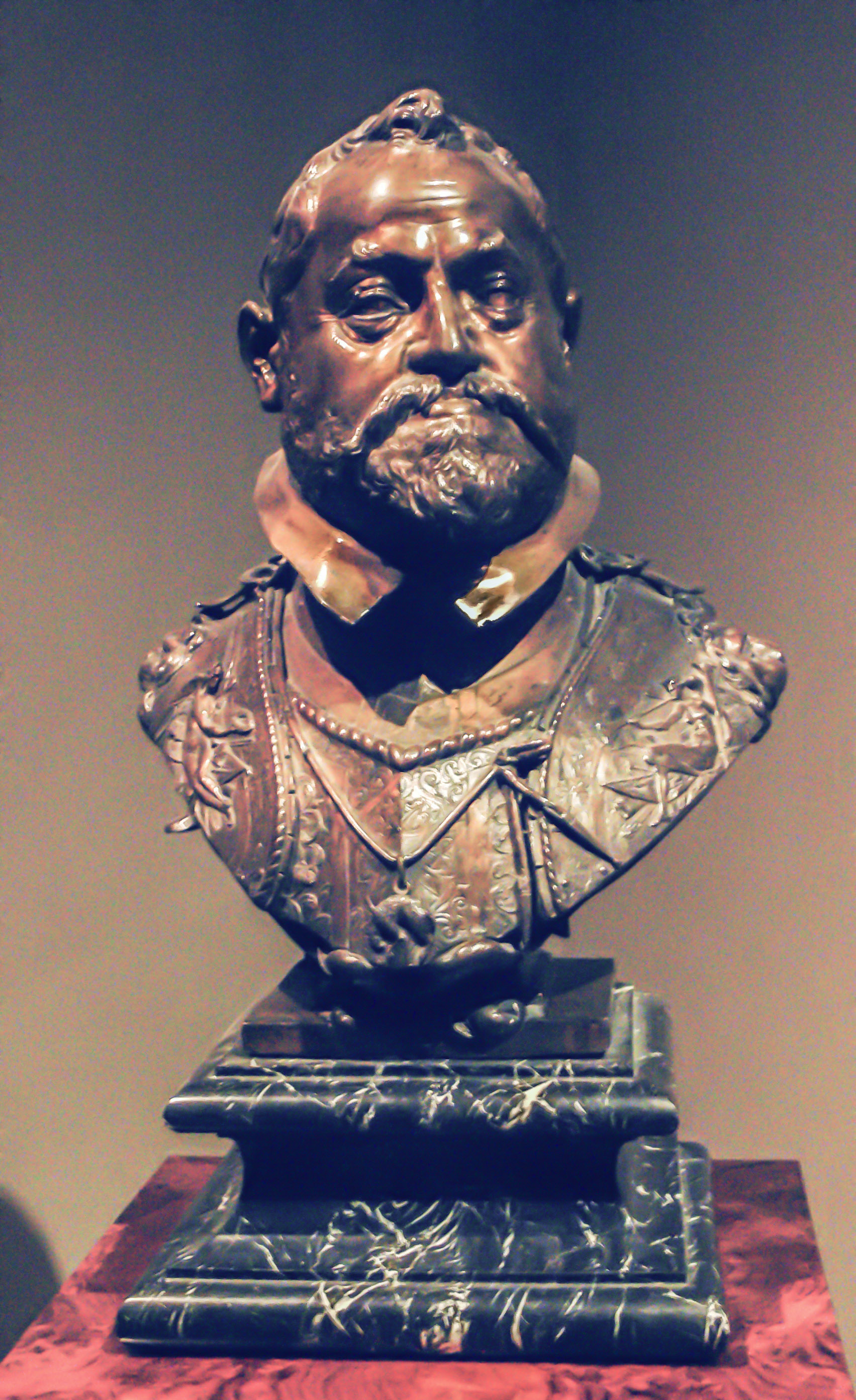
Bust of Emperor Rudolf II

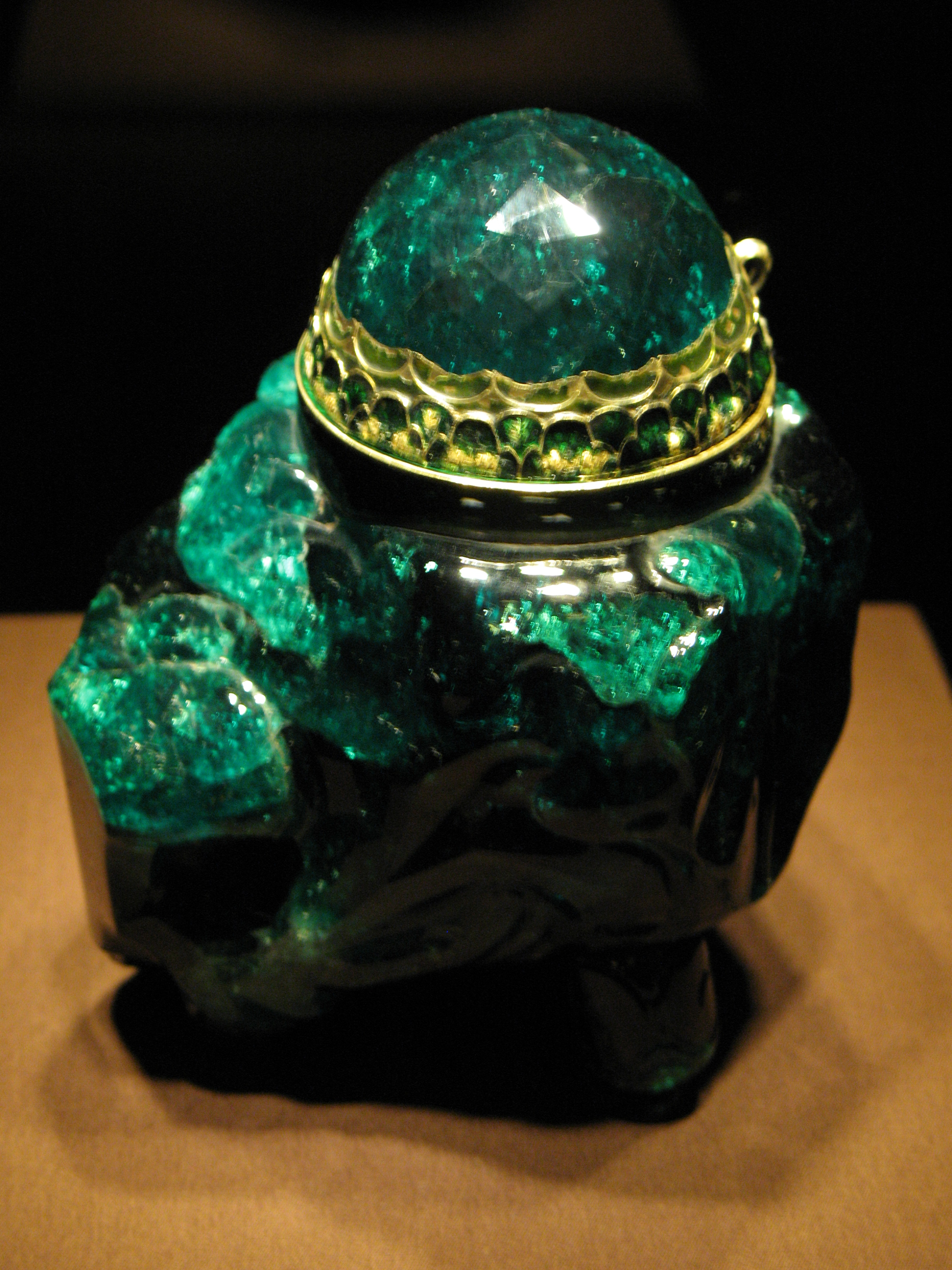
Emerald vessel

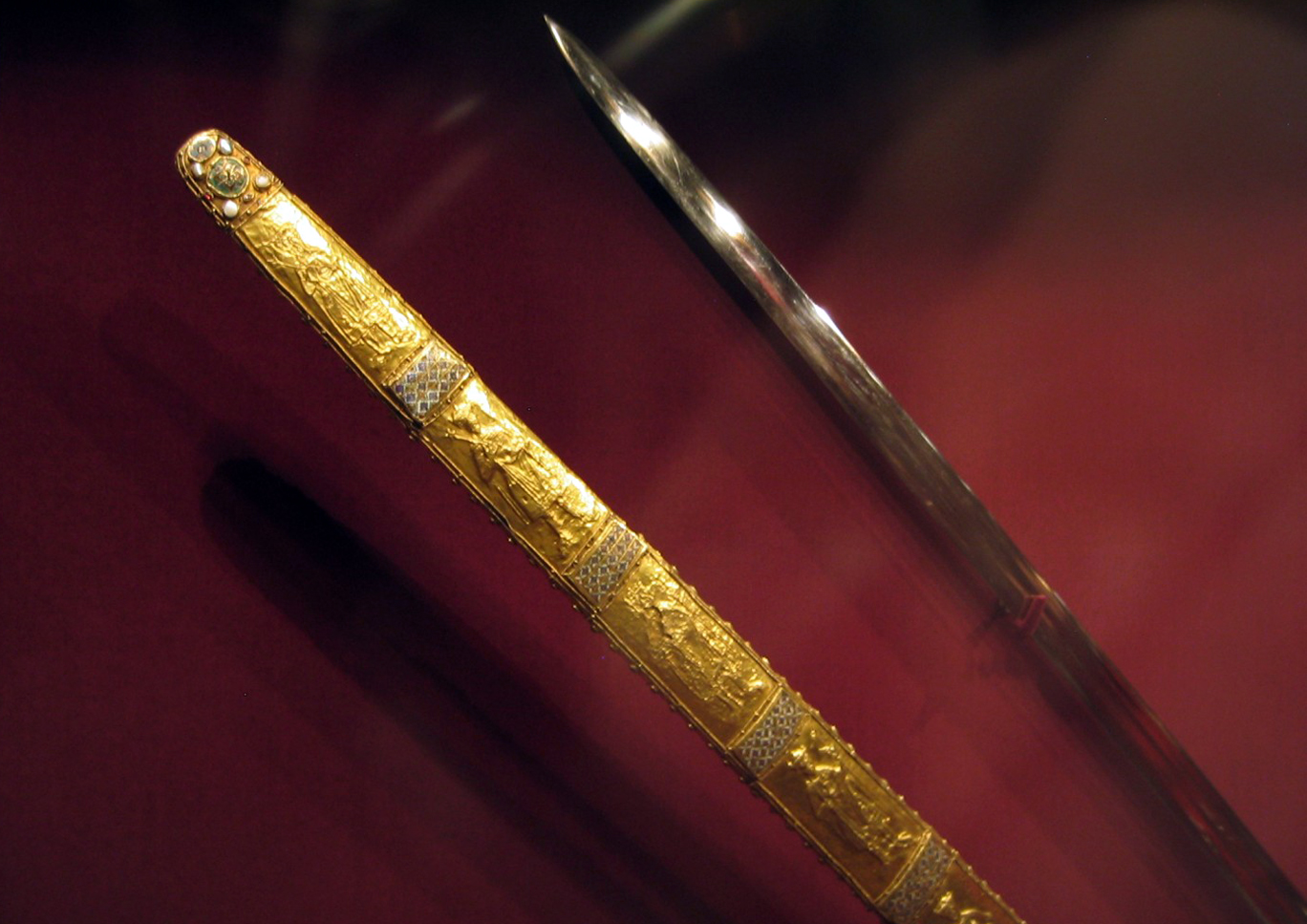
Imperial Sword

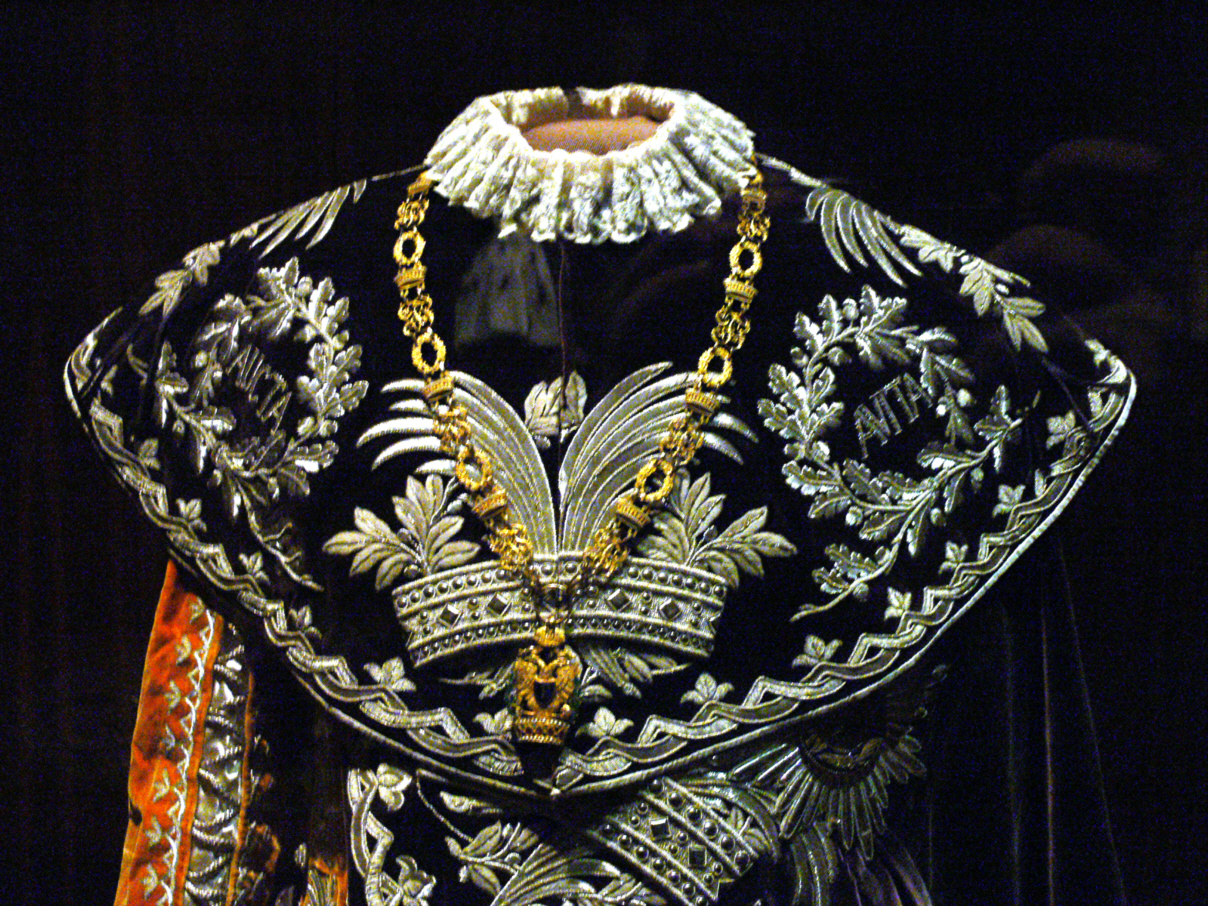
Regalia of the Austrian Order of the Iron Crown

== Display Case XIII ==
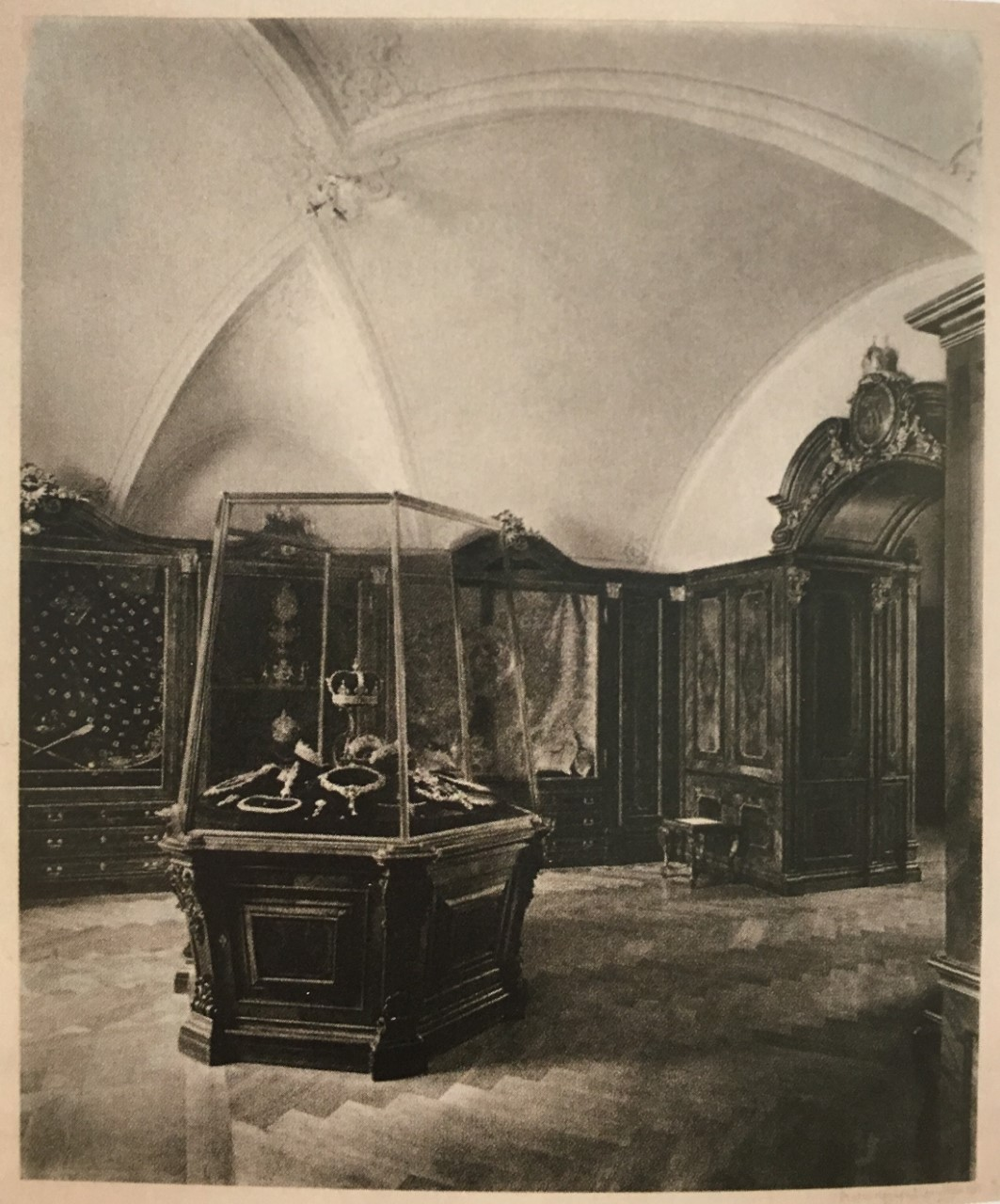
Imperial Treasury with display case XIII with the crown jewels that are lost since 1918

On 30 October 1918, the provisional National Assembly proclaimed the republic. As a result, on 1 November, by verbal order of Emperor Charles I, jewels were to be removed from the treasury and taken to Switzerland. The Court Office Director (Hofamtsdirektor) Wilhelm von Weckbecker, who was responsible for the treasuries, and treasurer Ulreich handed over to the Lord Chamberlain (Oberstkämmerer) Count Leopold Berchtold not only Empress Zita's private jewellery, but also the Habsburg-Lorraine family jewellery from display cases XII and XIII (Vitrine XIII) of the Secular Treasury. Packed in two bags Count Berchtold transported the jewels, some in cases, some only wrapped in paper, abroad by train the same night.

The documents list 14 precious objects from Empress Zita's private property and 39 objects belonging to the historical Habsburg-Lorraine household treasure, such as orders, crowns, pearls and diamonds. Among the latter, also known as the "Crown Jewels", were the world-famous "Florentine Diamond", a 133-carat brilliant from the possession of Franz Stephan of Lorraine, the famous emerald and ruby sets that can be traced back to Maria Theresa, Marie Antoinette and Empress Elisabeth, and the crown of Empress Elisabeth.

Numerous reports and arguments about the legality of the removal as well as a discussion about the question of ownership, at least of the crown jewels, followed in the next few years. The new government's argument was based on the wartime ban on the export of jewels, the Habsburg Law and the legalisation of the Habsburgs' private property by the Saint-Germain Peace Treaty. The demand for restitution was abandoned by the state in 1921.

The discussion about the crown jewels came up again in the 1960s in the course of the "Habsburg Crisis" on the occasion of the return of the heir to the throne Otto von Habsburg to Austria. To this day, the circumstances surrounding the crown jewels is discussed in publications. Several versions of the fate of the jewels exist.

The original display case XIII was recently identified again in the Imperial Furniture Collection, as were the empty cases left behind in the Treasury.

== Bibliography ==
- Brook, Stephan (2012). DK Eyewitness Travel Guide: Vienna. London: Dorling Kindersley Ltd. ISBN 978-0756684280.
- Kunsthistorisches Museum Wien (1991). The Secular and Ecclesiastical Treasuries. Vienna: Residenz Verlag. ISBN 978-3701706860.
- Leithe-Jasper, Manfred; Distelberger, Rudolf (2004). The Kunsthistorisches Museum Vienna: The Imperial and Ecclesiastical Treasury. Vienna: Scala Publishers. ISBN 978-3406429385.
- Schnorr, Lina (2012). Imperial Vienna. Vienna: HB Medienvertrieb GesmbH. ISBN 978-3950239690.
- Unterreiner, Katrin; Gredler, Willfried (2009). The Hofburg. Vienna: Pichler Verlag. ISBN 978-3854314912.
- Kirkpatrick, Sydney D. (2010). Hitler's holy relics : a true story of Nazi plunder and the race to recover the crown jewels of the Holy Roman Empire. New York: Simon & Schuster. ISBN 978-1416590620.
