= Imperial Sword =

Regalia of the Holy Roman Empire

Coordinates: 48°12′24″N 16°21′56″E

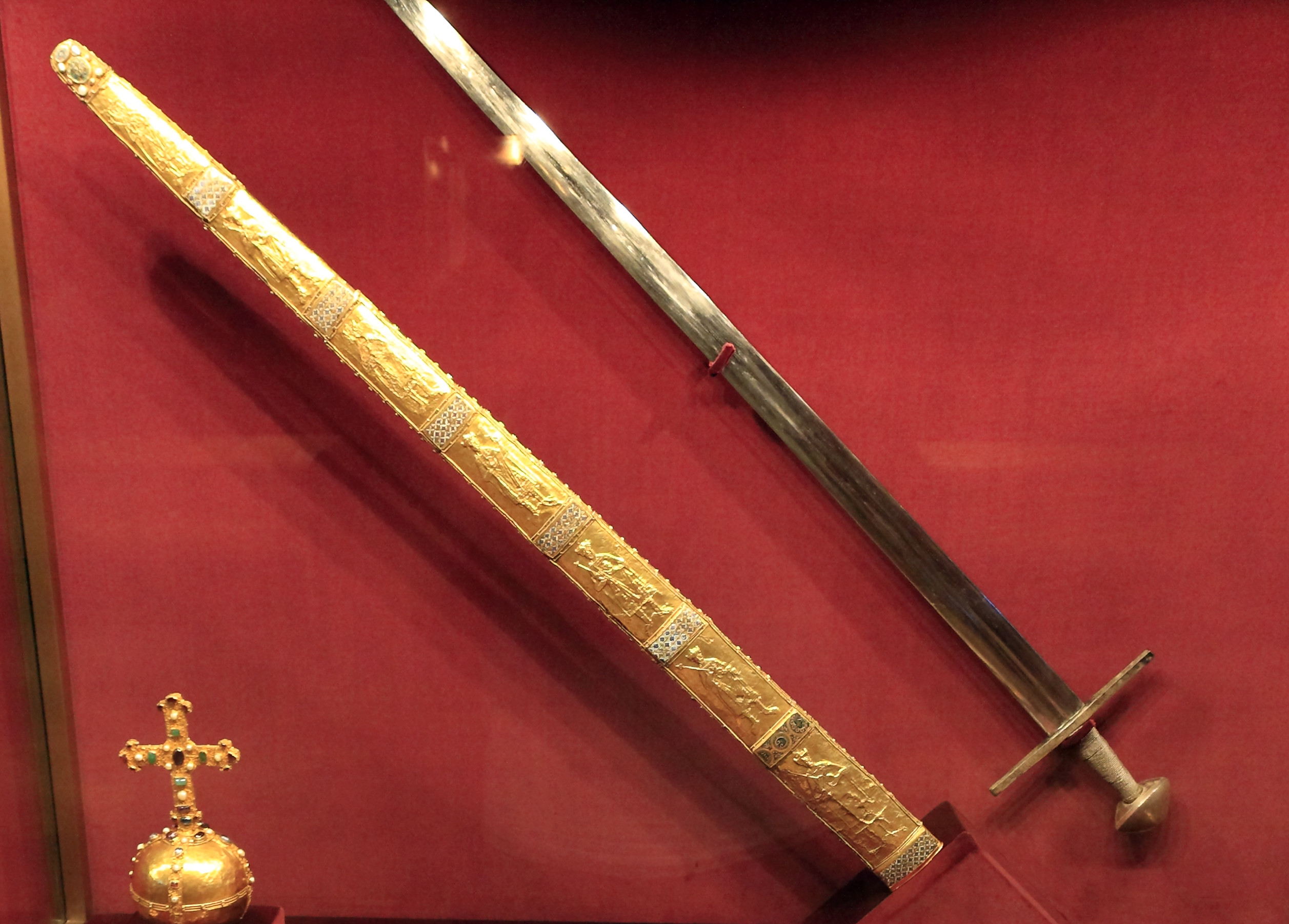
Imperial Sword and scabbard, kept in the Imperial Treasury at the Hofburg Palace in Vienna, Austria

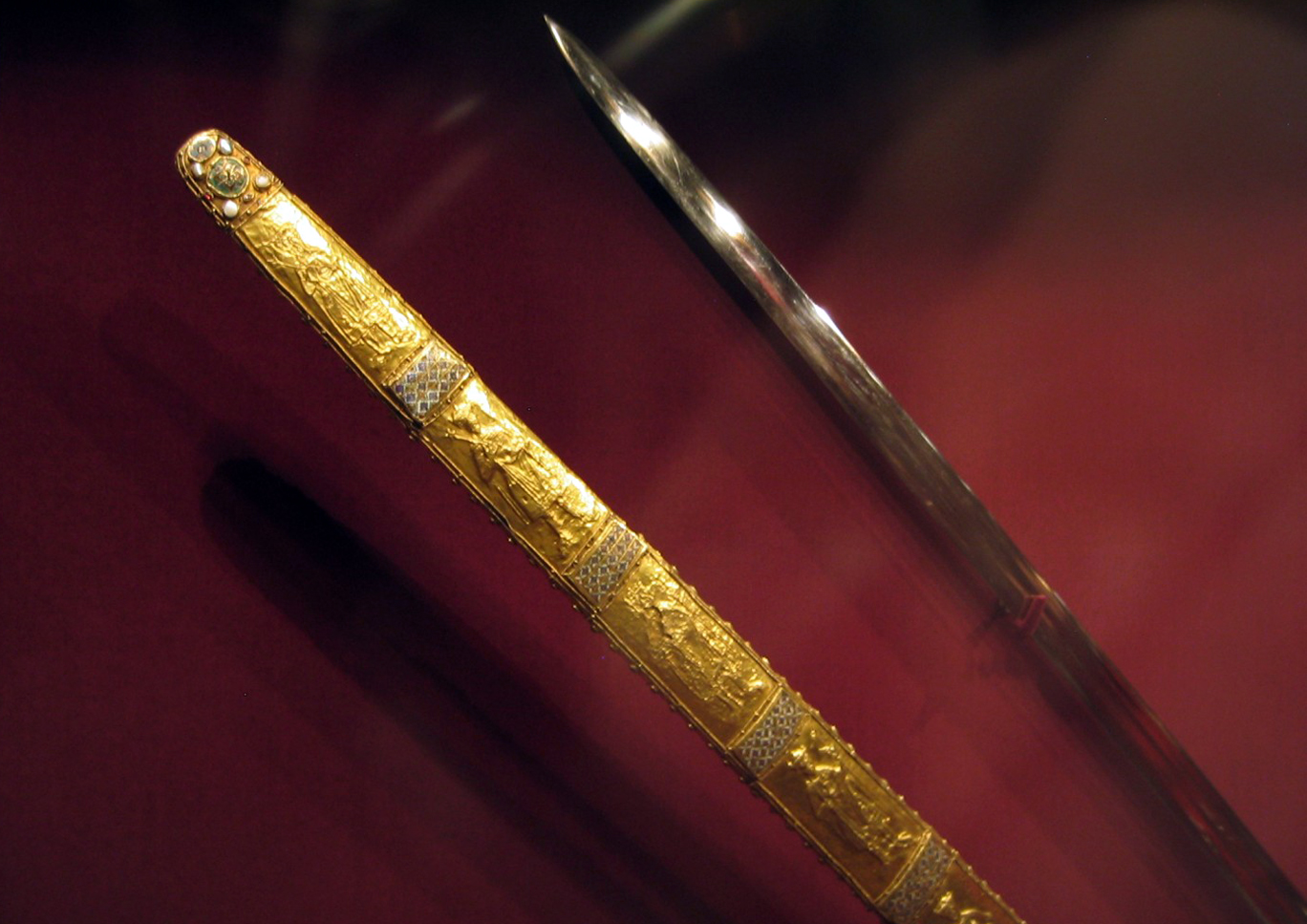
Imperial Sword and scabbard (detail)

The Imperial Sword (Latin: Gladius Imperatoria, German: Reichsschwert) is one of the four most important parts of the Imperial Regalia (Reichskleinodien) of the Holy Roman Empire. During a coronation, it was given to the emperor along with the Imperial Crown (Reichskrone), Imperial Sceptre (Reichszepter), and the Imperial Orb (Reichsapfel). All four parts of the Imperial Regalia are displayed in the Imperial Treasury at the Hofburg Palace in Vienna, Austria. It is also known as Mauritiusschwert, or the sword of Saint Maurice.

== History ==
The Imperial Sword was made for Emperor Otto IV in the twelfth century, possibly for his coronation as King of the Romans in 1198. Its predecessor, the sword of Otto III, is also preserved, in the Essen Abbey treasury.

The first known explicit mention of the sword dates to 1315, in a letter of a lady-in-waiting of Elisabeth of Aragon, wife to Frederick III. It may also be referenced in an inventory of 1246, which mentions merely zwey swert mit zweyn scheiden, gezieret mit edelem gesteyne (two swords, with two scabbards ornamented with gems). The first pictorial representations of the sword date to the fifteenth century, but the first detailed depiction only to the seventeenth century.

By legend, the Imperial Sword was connected with the donation of the sword, lance, and spurs, of Saint Maurice by the Abbey of Saint Maurice to king Henry the Fowler; the actual sword, however, postdates both Maurice and Henry.

== Description ==
=== Sword ===
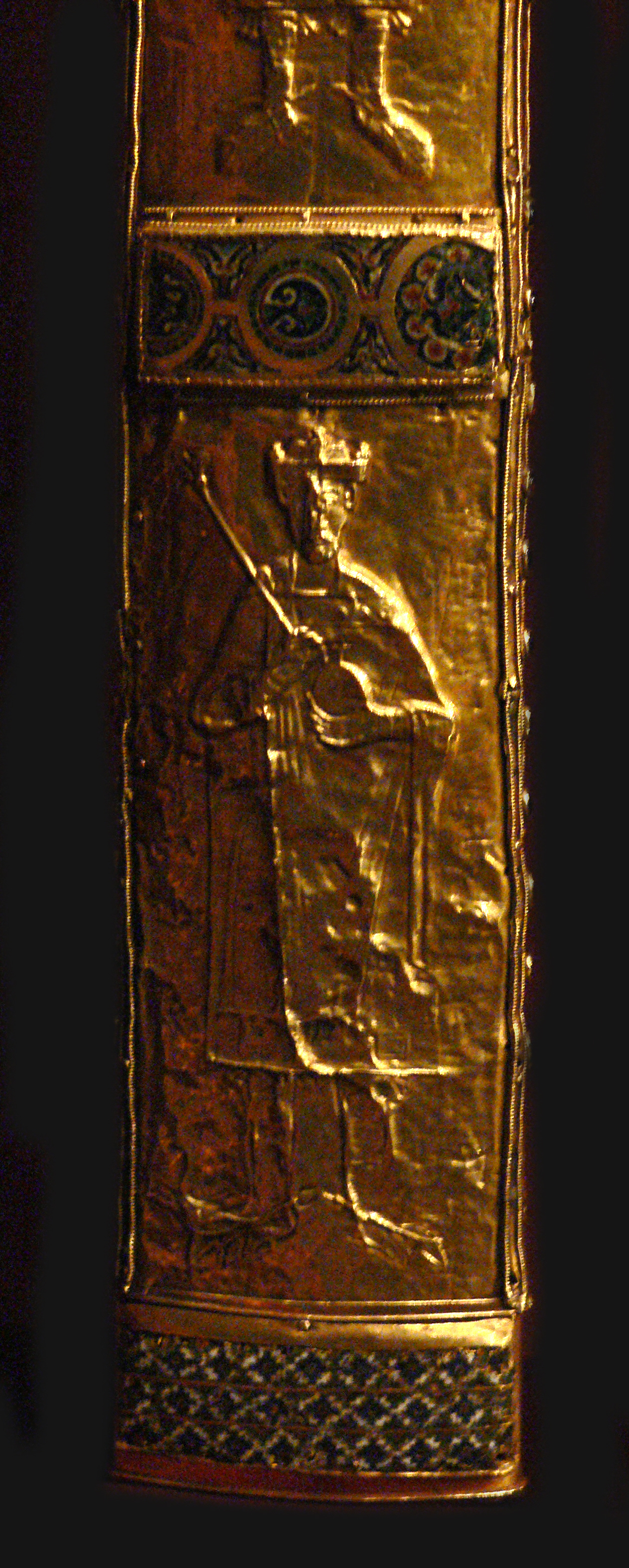
Imperial Sword scabbard (detail) showing one of the 14 engraved gold plates

The Imperial Sword has an overall length of 110 cm (43.3 in), with the length of the blade being 95.3 cm (37.5 in). The sword originated during the high medieval period, but was refitted and decorated several times during the late medieval and early modern periods—e.g., the addition of the silver wire wrapping the hilt. The crossguard on one side bears the Middle Latin inscription CHRISTVS : VINCIT : CHRISTVS : REIGNAT : CHRISTVS : INPERAT (Christ triumphs, Christ reigns, Christ rules). On the reverse side, the shorter variant CHRISTVS : VINCIT : CHRISTVS : REINAT. Schulze-Dörrlamm (1995:27) interprets the theological intention of this inscription as referring to Christ the Victor, Christ the King, and Christ the Emperor—the refrain of the Laudes imperiale and an invocation of Christ as legitimation for secular power and the translatio imperii to the Holy Roman Empire.

The pommel is of the "mushroom" or "tea-cosy" shape typical of the high medieval period. The pommel is engraved with the arms of Holy Roman Emperor Otto IV, who reigned from 1209 to 1215. The lower edge of the pommel is inscribed with BENEDICTVS · DO[minv]S DE[v]S QVI DOCET MANV[s]+ viz (Blessed be the Lord my God, who teaches the hand [to wield]). This is an abbreviated form of Psalm 144:1, Benedictus Dominus Deus meus, qui docet manus meas ad prælium, et digitos meos ad bellum (Blessed be the Lord my strength, which teacheth my hands to fight, and my fingers to war).

=== Scabbard ===
The scabbard of the sword is adorned with 14 gold plates engraved with depictions of monarchs. These pictures date to the eleventh century, and are thus about a century older than the sword itself. The figures have been identified as depicting the consecutive German monarchs from Charlemagne to Henry III, who was crowned in 1046.

== Gallery ==
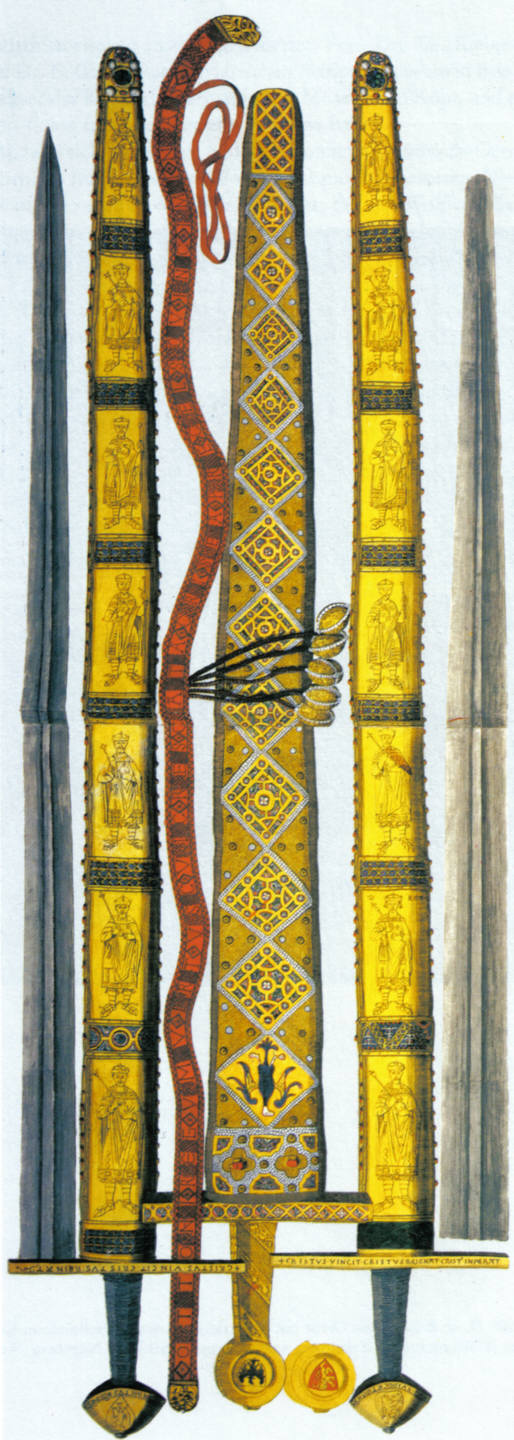
Imperial Sword colored etching showing both sides by Johann Adam Delsenbach, 1751

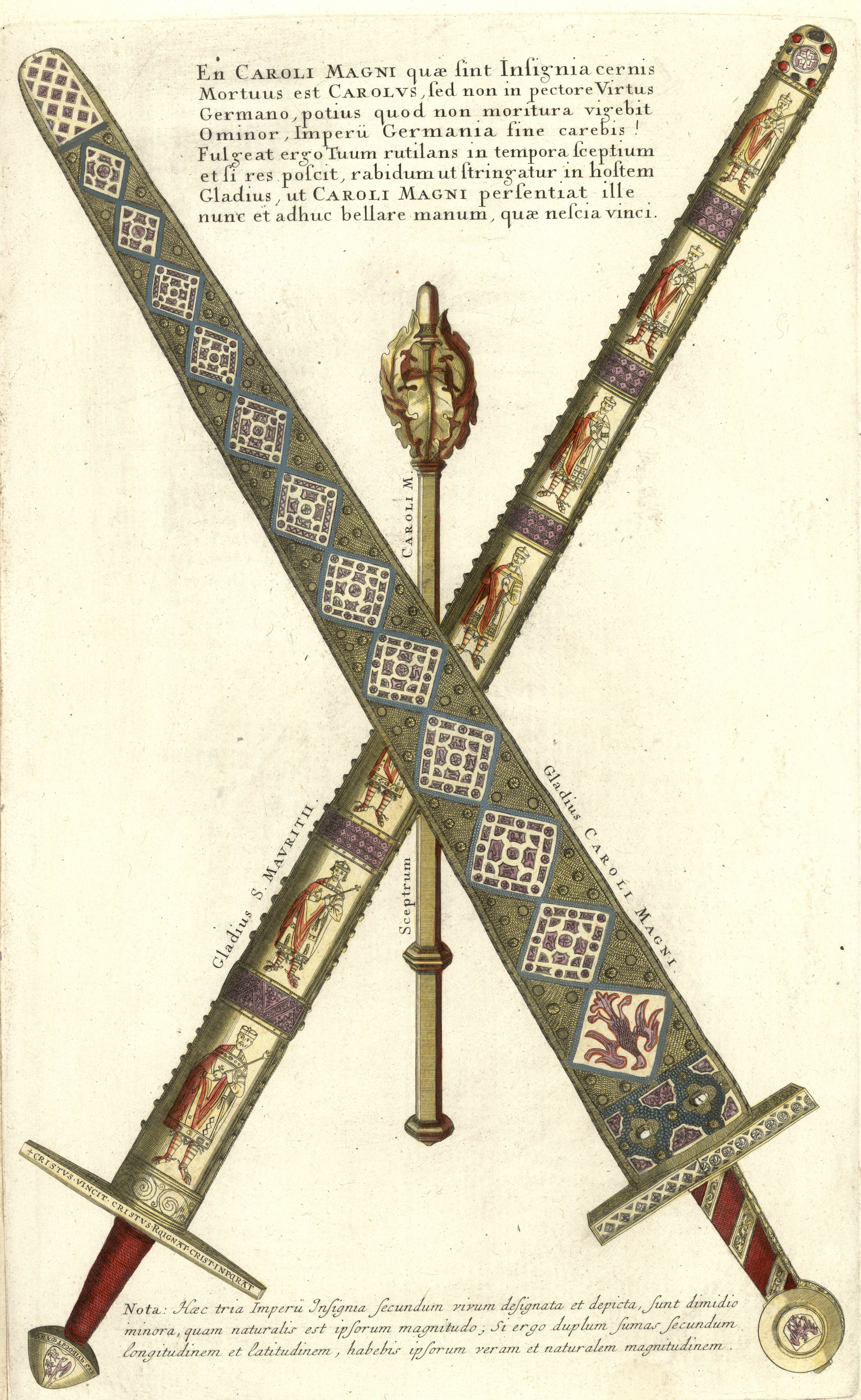
Imperial Sword illustration from the workshop of Johann Baptist Homann, 1755
