= Sabre of Charlemagne =

Curved blade

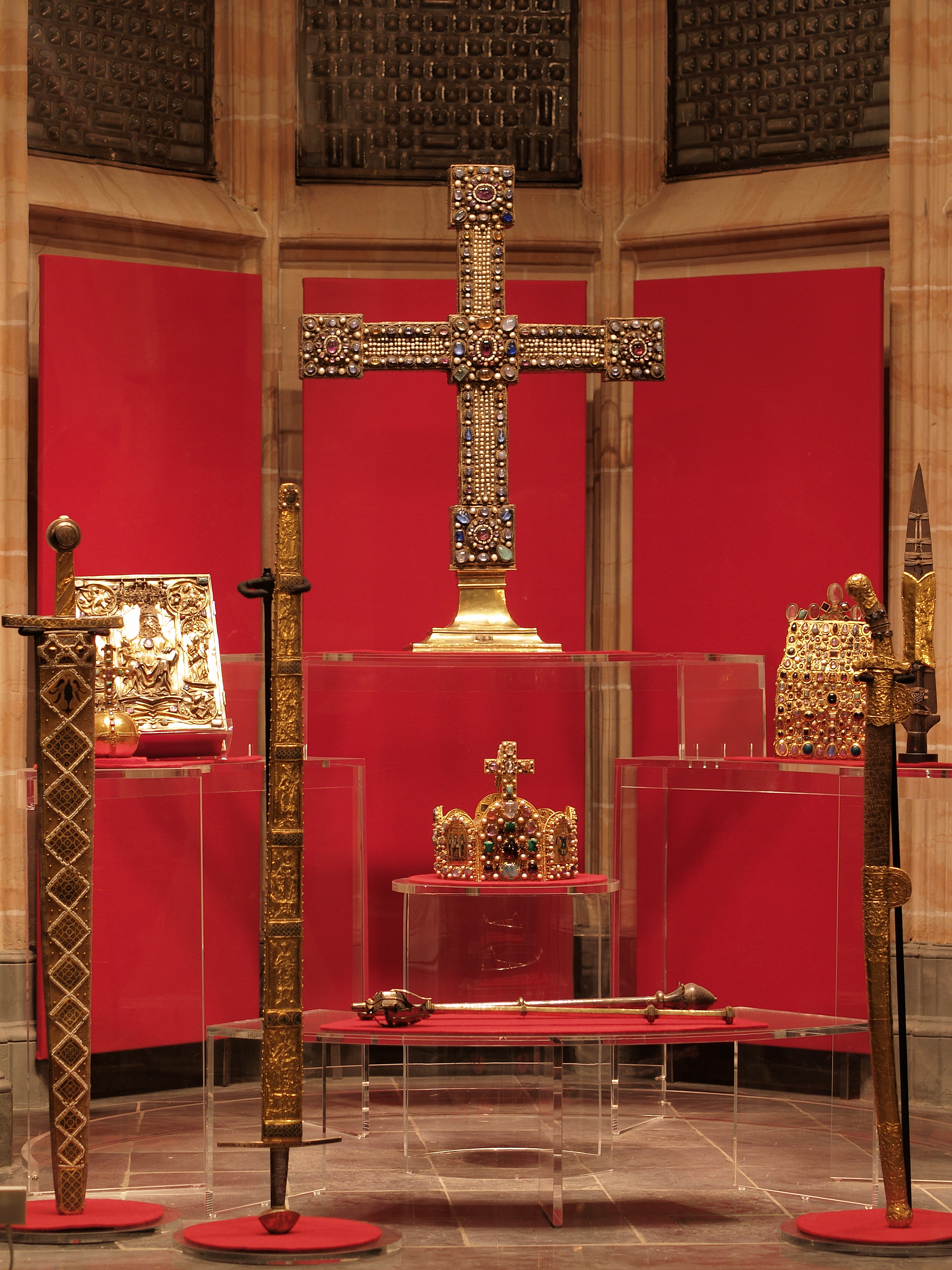
Replicas of the Imperial regalia of the Holy Roman Empire in the coronation hall of Aachen Rathaus, with the sabre of Charlemagne on the right

The so-called Sabre of Charlemagne (German: Säbel Karls des Großen) is an early sabre which has been exceptionally preserved (as opposed to recovered from the archaeological record) as part of the Aachen regalia of the Holy Roman Empire. Along with the rest of the imperial regalia from both Aachen and Nuremberg, it is now kept in the Hofburg Palace, Vienna.

The Sabre of Charlemagne is not to be confused with Joyeuse, another sword claimed to have been Charlemagne's personal weapon and used as regalia, but associated with the coronation of the French monarch rather than the Holy Roman Emperor.

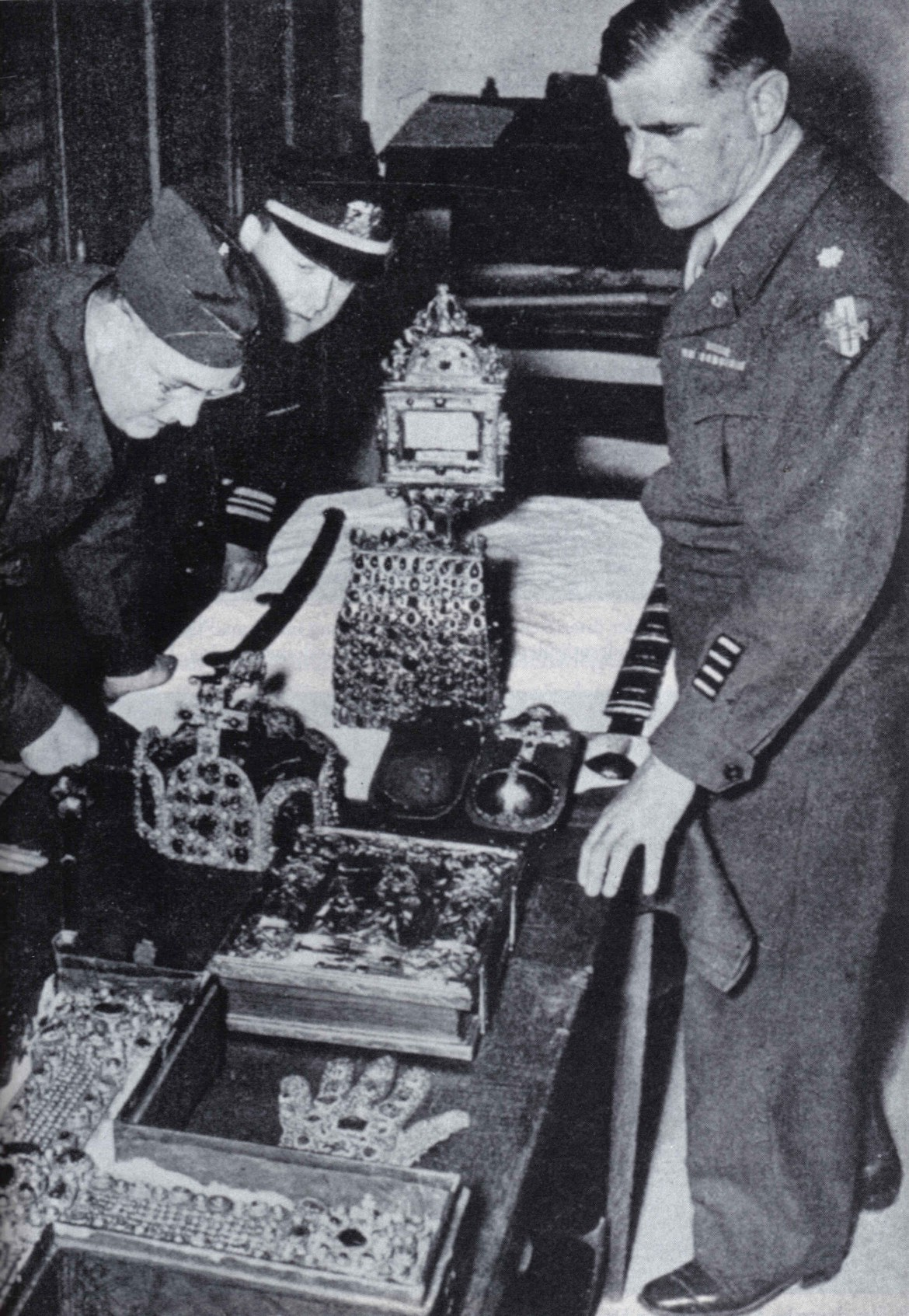
Examination of the Imperial regalia in the Wiener Nationalbank at their return in 1946.

== History ==
The sabre is possibly of Eastern European type and most likely dates to the first half of the 10th century. According to tradition, Otto III recovered the weapon when he opened Charlemagne's grave in AD 1000. 19th-century antiquarian scholarship was prepared to accept the weapon's Carolingian age, but the modern estimate, while compatible with its association with Otto III, rules out any direct connection with Charlemagne.

When French troops approached Aachen in 1794 the Imperial regalia located there were taken to the Capuchin abbey at Paderborn, then to Hildesheim in 1798 and finally to Vienna in 1801. The sabre was stored in the Treasury of the Hofburg Palace in Vienna. On the orders of Adolf Hitler, the imperial relics were brought to Nuremberg in 1938, where they were displayed in the Katharinenkloster. During the Second World War they were stored in the Historischer Kunstbunker to protect them from aerial bombardment. The Imperial regalia were found there by American soldiers in 1945 and returned to the Hofburg in 1946.

== See also ==
- Cultural depictions of Otto III, Holy Roman Emperor § Legends
