= Throne of Charlemagne =

Throne in Aachen Cathedral made in the 790s

Coordinates: 50.774647°N 6.083766°E

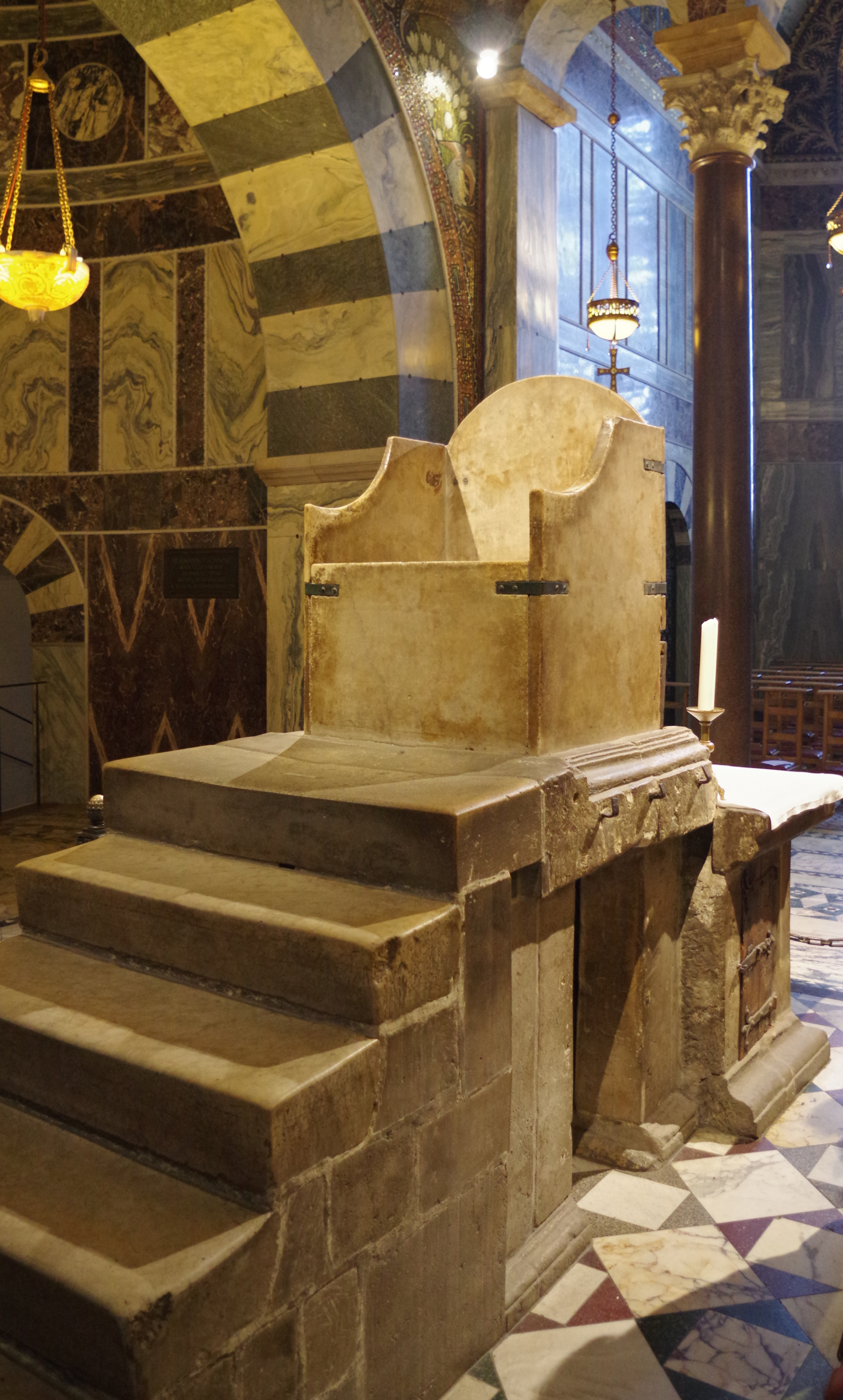
The royal throne in Aachen Cathedral

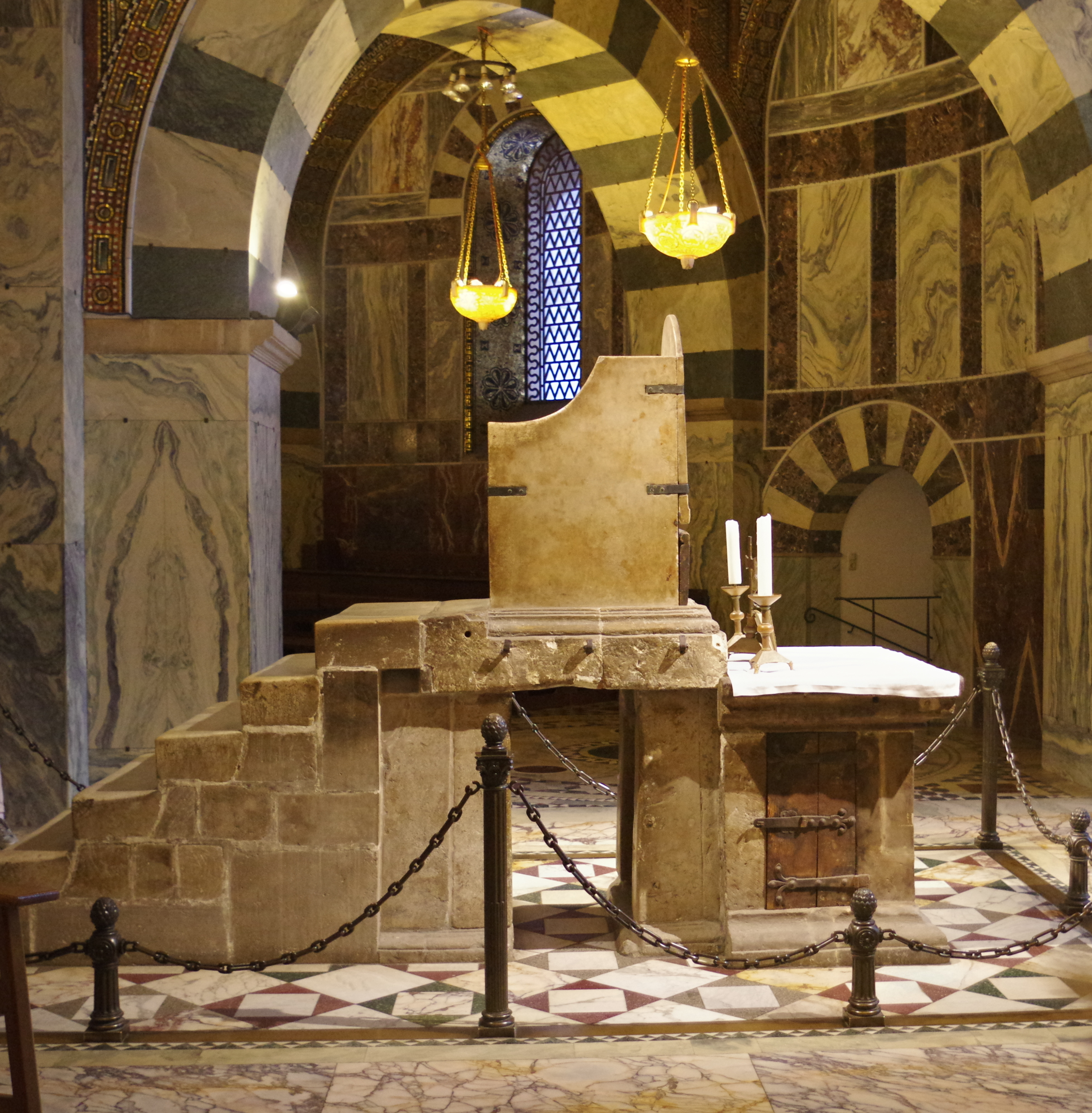
Side view of the throne

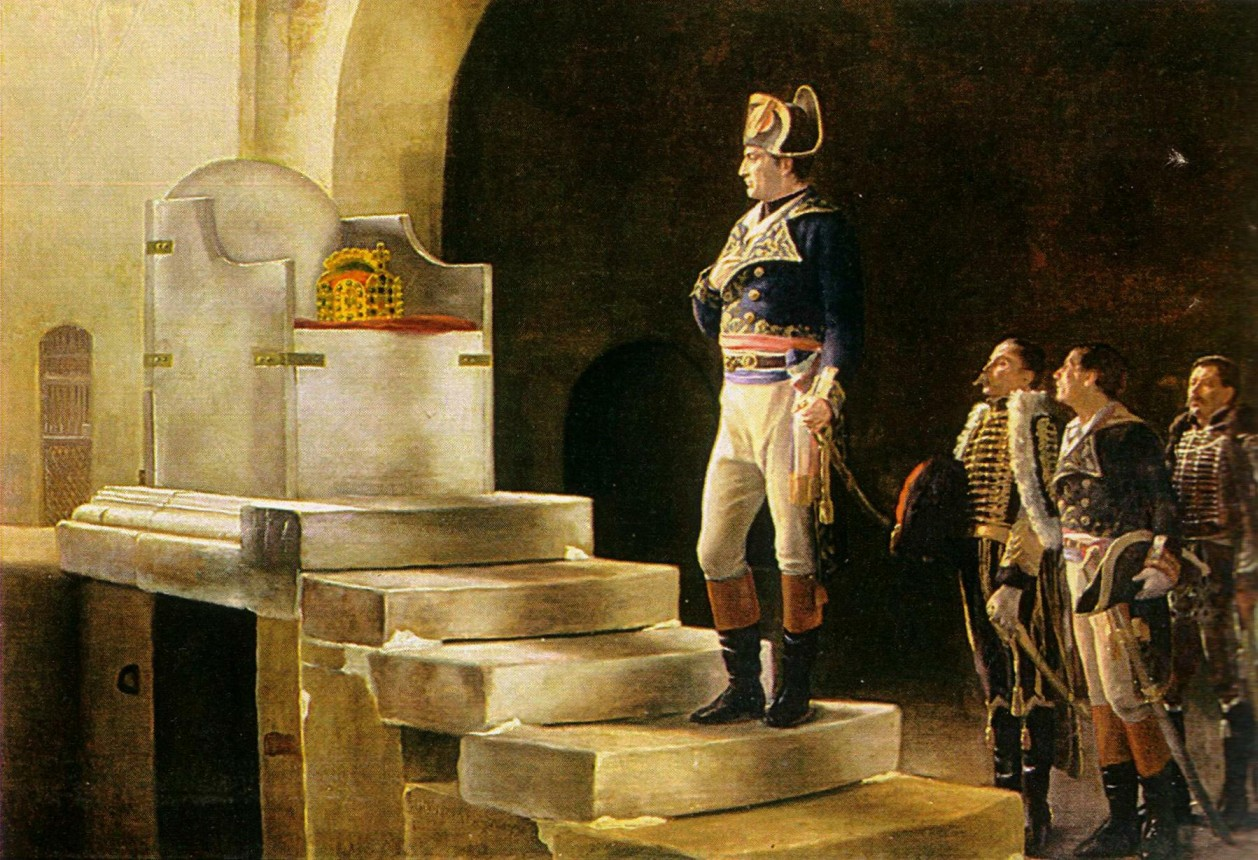
Napoleon before the Throne of Charlemagne (Henri-Paul Motte, 1898). The French emperor visited Aachen cathedral on 2 October 1804, and did not sit on the throne, out of respect.

The Throne of Charlemagne (German: Karlsthron or Aachener Königsthron, 'Royal Throne of Aachen') is a throne erected in the 790s by Charlemagne, as one of the fittings of his palatine chapel in Aachen (today's Aachen Cathedral) and placed in the Octagon of the church. Until 1531, it served as the coronation throne of the King of the Romans, being used at a total of thirty-one coronations. As a result, especially in the eleventh century, it was referred to as the totius regni archisolium ('Archstool of the Whole Realm'). Charlemagne himself was not crowned on this throne, but instead in the Old St. Peter's Basilica in Rome by Pope Leo III in 800 AD.

== Description ==
The throne is very plain and simple and entirely free of ornamentation. Six steps lead up to the seat, which is on a podium. The seat itself consists of four marble plates held together with bronze clamps. According to one modern theory, the marble and the steps were taken from the Church of the Holy Sepulchre in Jerusalem around 800. Another (unverified) interpretation claims they are the steps of Pilate's palace, which Jesus climbed after he was scourged. There are fine, incised lines on one of the two side-plates, which served as the board for an ancient game of nine men's morris. The back plate shows an early depiction of the crucifixion. Based on the surface treatment and the presence of etchings from several eras of pagan and Christian themes, it can be concluded that when the plates were installed here, they had belonged to at least two contexts already.

The wooden interior structure, which is now in the Rheinisches Landesmuseum Bonn, supported a now-lost marble seating plate. Under that is a shelf, on which part of the Imperial Regalia were kept, particularly St. Stephen's Purse, according to modern research. Radiocarbon dating shows that this oakwood panel dates to c.800.

The throne rests on four stone pillars. This made it possible for visitors in later times to crawl under the throne, simultaneously a demonstration of humility to the newly anointed ruler and an act of veneration for Jesus Christ, who was related to the throne by the depiction on the rear marble plaque (see under Symbolism). The polished appearance of the inner surfaces of the four pillars indicates that countless visitors must have observed this ritual over the centuries. The area is now roped off.

The Throne has survived all renovations and demolitions in the chapel through the centuries. However, in the course of measures taken by the Cathedral chapter for the protection of the precious artefacts of the cathedral and its treasury against the bombing and fire-fighting water in the Second World War, it was covered with tar paper and buried in sand. Today there are dirty yellow stains on the throne from the tar paper, which have not been removed for fear of damaging the ancient graffiti on the throne.

In the passage underneath the throne and in the immediate vicinity, the original Carolingian flooring is preserved. The types of stone incorporated into this are from ancient ruins and were laid in the Italian representational style. Specifically, the original flooring is of white marble, spinach-green porphyry and red porphyry from Egypt. The material might derive from the Palace of Theoderic in Ravenna, where many similar floor tiles have been found.

== Symbolism ==
The throne, whose symbolic connections qualify it as an outstanding document of the Carolingian Renaissance, is found in the west gallery of the upper level (called the high church) of the Carolingian octagon.

The placement of the throne is in a tight structural context within the Palatine chapel, whose proportional ratios create a symbolic image of the Heavenly Jerusalem, expressed in numbers. Probably following the biblical model of the throne of Solomon, which also placed the ruler in a separate sphere by means of a gallery, the throne was assigned the highest place and thereby unmistakably symbolised the Emperor's claim to temporal and spiritual rulership over the realm and his function as mediator between heaven and earth. In this respect the number of steps could be of symbolic relevance, since according to I Kings 10.19 Solomon's throne also had six steps and stood in a hall which was opposite a cube-shaped (i.e. six-faced) templeː the Holy of Holies (I Kings 7.6f.). Deliberate reference to the model of Solomon's throne was fitting for Charlemagne's claim to an unconditional universal rule as regent of a Christian world empire, ruling over a new chosen people – so to speak as a new Solomon. This meaning is strengthened by Charlemagne's documented admiration as King for the equally prestigious father and predecessor of Solomon, King David, whose role as God's governor on earth Charlemagne always sought. In 801 it is said, "We referred to Charles at court by the name 'David'." This message was underlined by the use of marble from the Holy Land, which as spolia from the Church of the Holy Sepulchre in Jerusalem is connected to Jesus Christ and therefore also to the idea of the Divine right of kings. Furthermore, according to Medieval thought, through contact with Christ the marble plaques would be turned into holy relics.

The throne is in the western part of the chapel, which has an east–west orientation. The view of the enthroned ruler falls to the east in the expectation that the Last Judgement would come from this direction and along with it the end of all temporal rule.

The four columns of the stone podium could represent the world ruled by the temporal sovereign with its four elements (fire, water, air, and earth), its four seasons, and its four cardinal directions. A reference to the four rivers of the Garden of Eden, which brought prosperity to the earth, could also be seen.

Most likely an altar consecrated to the Archangel Michael stood in the room behind the throne. Accordingly, the crowned king taking his place on the royal throne could be assured that the Archangel literally "had his back".

== Bibliography ==
- Hans Jürgen Roth: Ein Abbild des Himmels. Der Aachener Dom – Liturgie, Bibel, Kunst. Thouet, Aachen 2011, pp. 37–45 a. o (German).

=== Further reading ===
- Leo Hugot: Der Königsthron im Aachener Dom. In: Koldewey-Gesellschaft. Bericht über die 29. Tagung für Ausgrabungswissenschaft und Bauforschung. Köln, 1976, pp. 36–42 (German).
- Francesco Gabrieli, André Guillou, Bryce Lyon, Jacques Henri Pirenne, Heiko Steuer: Mohammed und Karl der Große. Belser, Stuttgart 1993, ISBN 3-7630-2097-7 (German).
- Sven Schütte: Der Aachener Thron. In: M. Kramp (Hrsg.): Krönungen, Könige in Aachen - Geschichte und Mythos. Exhibtion catalogue. Philipp von Zabern, Mainz 1999, ISBN 3-8053-2617-3, pp. 213–222 (German).
- Katharina Corsepius: Der Aachener „Karlsthron“ zwischen Zeremoniell und Herrschermemoria. In: Marion Steinicke, Stefan Weinfurter (Hrsg.): Investitur- und Krönungsrituale. Herrschaftseinsetzungen im kulturellen Vergleich. Böhlau, Köln 2005, ISBN 3-412-09604-0, pp. 359–375 (German).
