= Takht-e-Soleiman (disambiguation) =

Takht-e Soleymān is an archaeological site in West Azerbaijan, Iran.

Takht-e-Soleiman ('Throne of Solomon'), or variant spellings, may also refer to:

- Takht-e Suleyman Massif, a subrange of central Alborz mountains, Iran
  - Mount Takht-e Suleyman, a mountain
- Takht-e Soleyman District, in Takab County, West Azerbaijan, Iran
- Takht-e Soleyman, Fars, a city in Iran
- Takht-e-Sulaiman, a mountain in the Federally Administered Tribal Areas of Pakistan
- Qasre Abunasr, or Takht-e Sulayman, the site of an ancient settlement in Shiraz, Fars province, Iran

== See also ==
- Throne of Solomon, a motif in Judaism, Christianity and Islam
- Shankaracharya Hill, a sacred hill in Srinagar, Jammu and Kashmir, India
- Sulayman Mountain, in Kyrgyzstan
- Sulaiman Mountains, in the southern Hindu Kush mountain system in Afghanistan and Pakistan
