= Throne of Solomon =

Throne of King Solomon

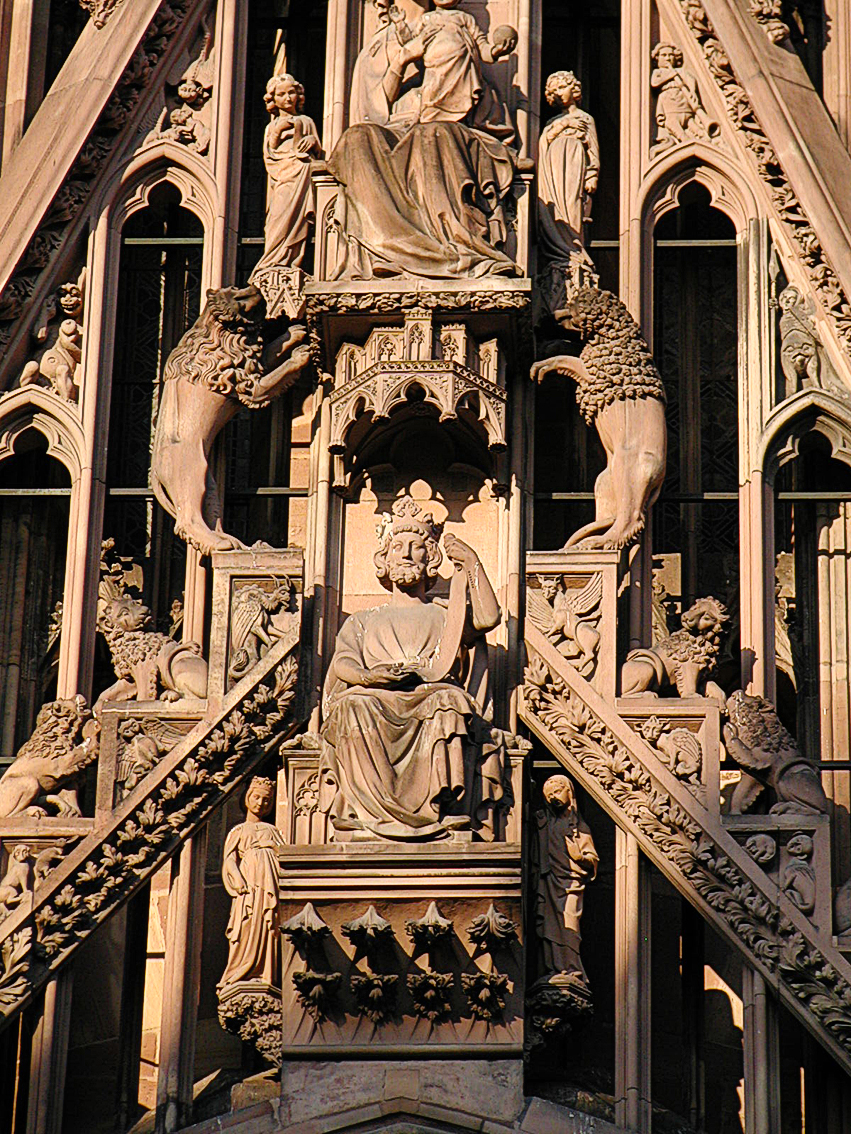
Strasbourg Cathedral

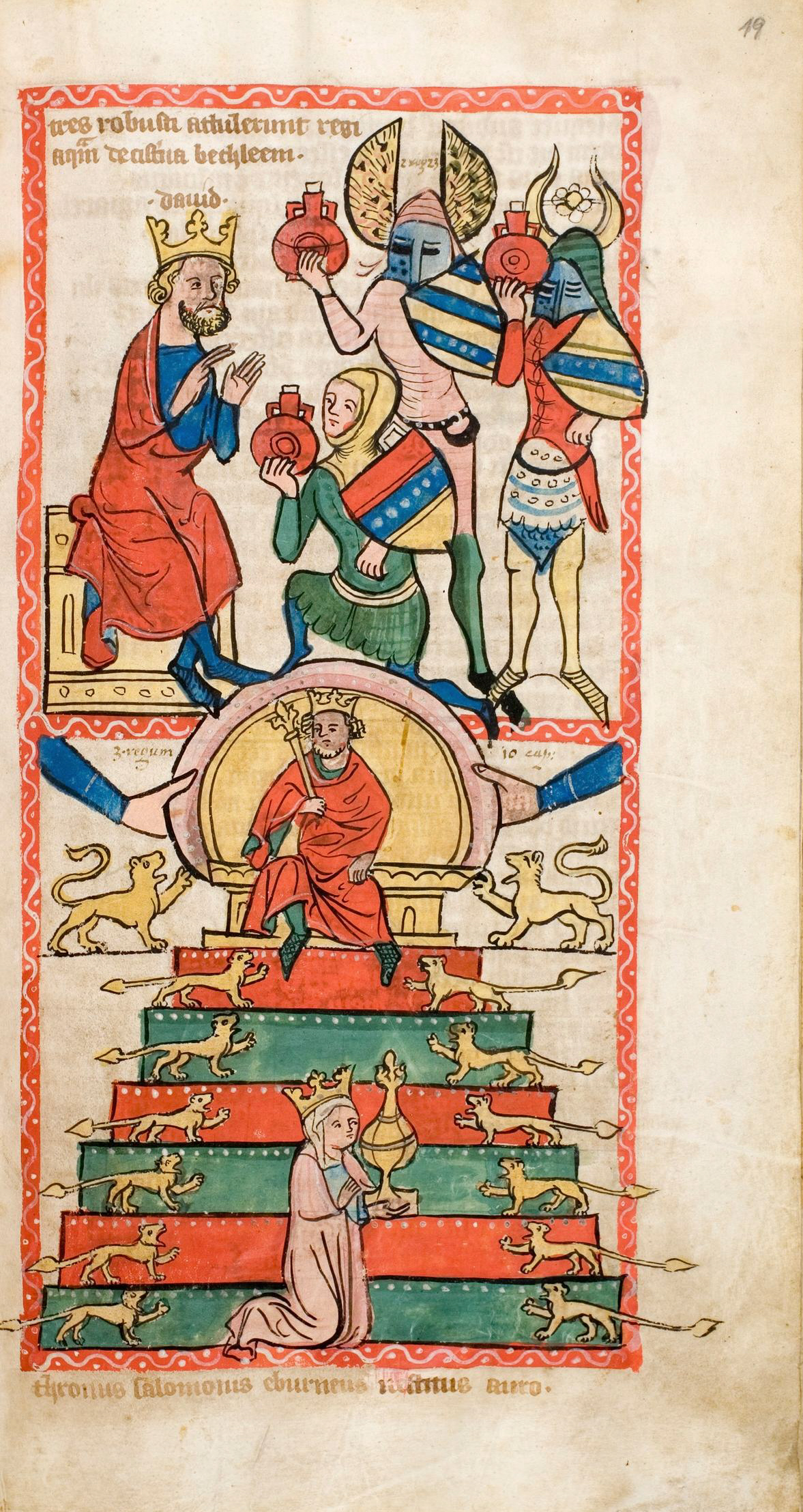
Depiction of Solomon's throne (lower half), from a Speculum Humanae Salvationis, around 1360

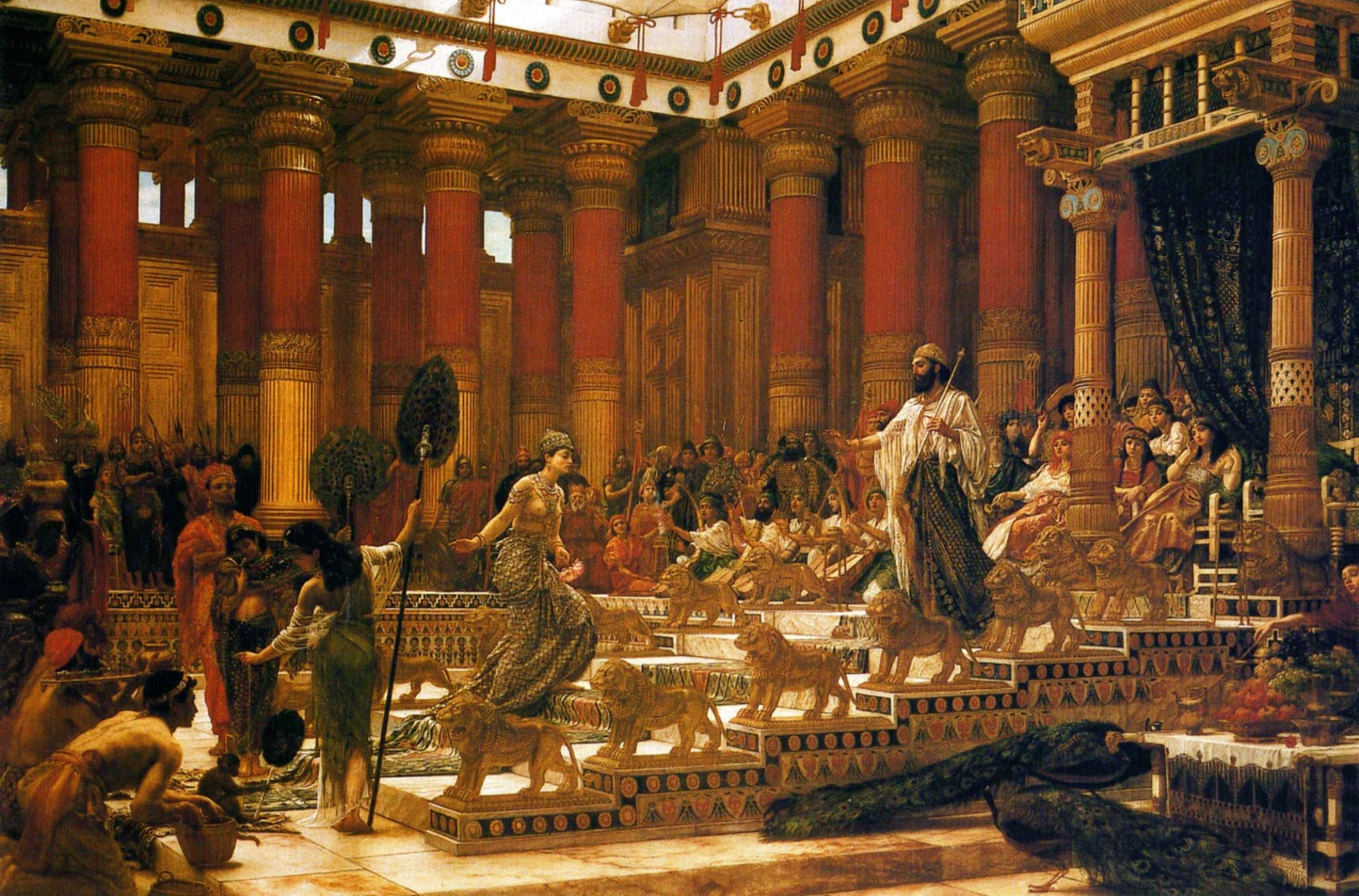
The Visit of the Queen of Sheba to King Solomon (painting by Edward Poynter, 1890)

The Throne of Solomon is the throne of King Solomon in the Hebrew Bible, and is a motif in Judaism, Christianity and Islam.

The throne as Solomon's seat of state is described in 1 Kings 10:

18 Moreover the king made a great throne of ivory, and overlaid it with the finest gold. 19 There were six steps to the throne, and the top of the throne was round behind; and there were arms on either side by the place of the seat, and two lions standing beside the arms. 20 And twelve lions stood there on the one side and on the other upon the six steps; there was not the like made in any kingdom. JPS 1917

== Hebrew Bible ==
The term "throne" is used both literally and metonymically in the Hebrew Bible.

As a symbol for kingship, the throne is seen as belonging to David, or to God Himself. In 1 Kings 1:37 Benaiah's blessing to Solomon was "may the LORD... make his throne greater than the throne of my lord king David"; while in 1 Chronicles 29:23 we are told "Solomon sat on the throne of the LORD as king".

According to I Kings 7:7, Solomon's throne was placed in the Porch of Judgment, being actually an audience chamber where the king sat in judgment. Its floors were paved with cedar wood. In the Aramaic translation it is described as being an anteroom or vestibule, called "porch of the pillars."

=== Judaism ===
Among the treasures which Asa took from Zerah the Ethiopian, and which Zerah had taken from Shishak (II Chronicles 12:9, compare 16:2), there was also the marvelous throne of Solomon upon which all the kings of Judah subsequently sat; while the other great treasures were given by Asa to the king of Syria to obtain his alliance; then they were taken again by the Ammonites, to be recaptured by Jehoshaphat; then they fell into the hands of Sennacherib, from whom Hezekiah recovered them, and at the capture of Jerusalem they came into the hands of the Babylonians; A Jewish tradition holds that the throne was removed to Babylon, then Ahasuerus sat on the throne of Solomon. then into those of the Persians, and afterward of the Macedonians, and finally of the Romans, who kept them at Rome. Another tradition holds that six steps related to six terms for the earth. According to the Targum Sheni of Megillat Esther, Solomon's throne was one of the earliest mechanical devices invented, with movable parts. When it was transferred to Persia some centuries later and used in the palace of Ahasuerus, it ceased to work. It has been described as a throne overlaid with gold, and studded with jewels; emeralds, cat's eye, the Baghdadi onyx, pearls and marble. It was ascended by many steps, the sides of which were aligned with twelve sculptured lions of gold, before whom were golden sculptures of eagles, the right paw of each lion set opposite the left wing of each eagle. As one approached the top of the staircase, there were another six steps directly in front of the semi-circular throne, each step with a pair of sculpted animals, each in gold; the first step having a couching bull opposite a lion; the second a wolf on its haunches opposite a sheep; the third a panther opposite a camel; the fourth an eagle opposite a peacock; the fifth a wildcat opposite a cock; the sixth a hawk opposite a pigeon. Above the throne was a seven-branched candlestick which afforded light, each branch bearing a sculpted image of the seven patriarchs: Adam (the first man), Noah, Shem, Abraham, Isaac, Jacob, and Job among them and on the seven of the other the names of Levi, Kohath, Amram, Moses, Aaron, Eldad, Medad, and, in addition, Hur (another version has Haggai). Above the candelabrum was a golden jar filled with olive oil and beneath it a golden basin which supplied the jar with oil and on which the names of Nadab, Abihu, and Eli and his two sons were engraved. Over the throne, twenty-four vines were fixed to cast a shadow on the king's head.From the sixth step the eagles raised the king and placed him in his seat, near which a golden serpent lay coiled. When the king was seated the large eagle placed the crown on his head, the serpent uncoiled itself, and the lions and eagles moved upward to form a shade over him. The dove then descended, took the scroll of the Law from the Ark, and placed it on Solomon's knees. When the king sat, surrounded by the Sanhedrin, to judge the people, the wheels began to turn, and the beasts and fowls began to utter their respective cries, which frightened those who had intended to bear false testimony. Moreover, while Solomon was ascending the throne, the lions scattered various fragrant spices

Above the throne was also a sculpted design showing seventy golden seats upon which sat the seventy members of the Sanhedrin, adjudicating in the presence of King Solomon. At the two sides of King Solomon's ears were fixed two fish of the sea. At the very top of Solomon's throne were fixed twenty-four golden wings that provided a protective shade and covering for the king, and whenever the king wished to ascend his throne, the bull on the first step would, by a movable, mechanical contraption, outstretch its forearm and place the king upon the second step, and so-forth, until he ascended the sixth step, upon which ascension mechanical eagles then descended and lifted-up the king, placing him upon his throne.

== Christianity ==
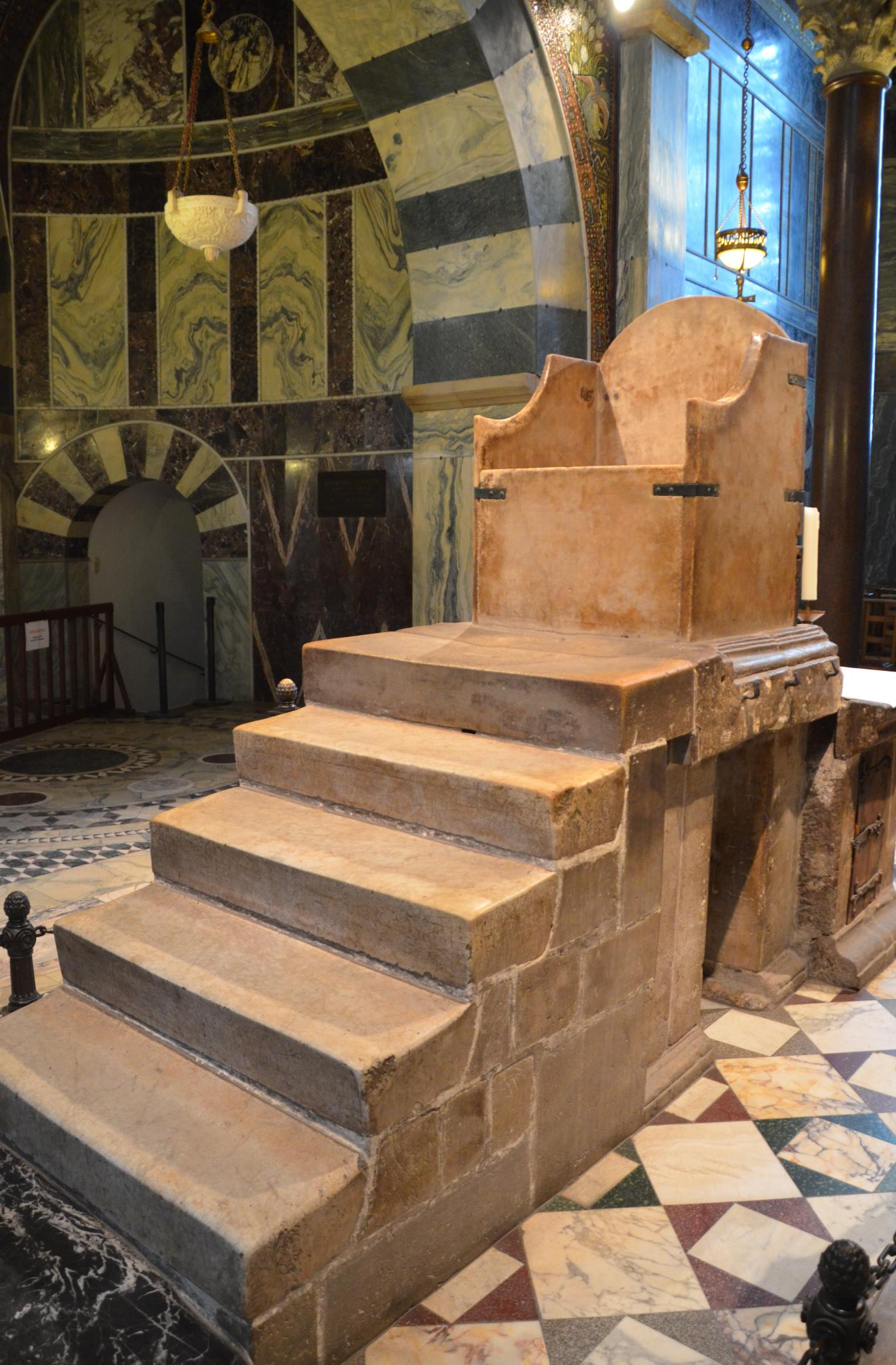
Royal Throne at Aachen Cathedral, coronation seat of the Holy Roman Emperors

The New Testament speaks only of the "throne of David," as in the angel Gabriel's message in Luke 1:32 in relation to the Davidic line, and notably the Gospel of Luke gives the descent of Jesus via Nathan (son of David), not Solomon. In religious tradition the Seat of Wisdom in Roman Catholic tradition is associated with Solomon, and in art, such as the Lucca Madonna (van Eyck), which portrays the Virgin sitting on the throne of Solomon.

A "Throne of Solomon" was also among the Solomonic objects of the Byzantine Court at Constantinople.

The Throne of Charlemagne, or Royal Throne at Aachen (Aachener Königsthron) is a throne erected in the 790s by Charlemagne, as one of the fittings of his palatine chapel in Aachen. Until 1531, it served as the throne of the coronation of the Holy Roman Emperors and the King of the Romans, being used at a total of thirty-one coronations. As a result, especially in the eleventh century, it was referred to as the totius regni archisolum ("Archstool of the Whole Realm"). Charlemagne himself was not crowned on this throne, but instead in the Old St. Peter's Basilica in Rome by Pope Leo III. The throne was modeled after the throne of Solomon.

The Throne Chair of Denmark was also inspired by the throne of Solomon.

Various depictions in sacred art such as stained glass windows, frescoes, and paintings depict the throne and the king.

== Islam ==
The throne of Solomon featured both in Islamic commentary, and art, including mosque decoration.

The concept has given rise to various geographical and royal names:

- Ghasre Abu-Nasr (Abu-Nasr Palace) or Takht e Sulayman (Throne of Solomon), archeological remains in Shiraz, Iran
- Takht-e Soleyman District (بخش تخت سلیمان, meaning the "Throne of Solomon"), district in West Azerbaijan, Iran
- Takht-e Soleymān (تخت سلیمان, Takht-e Soleymān, "Throne of Solomon") archaeological site in West Azarbaijan, Iran
- Takht-e-Sulaiman Solomon's Throne (Urdu, Pashto : تخت سليمان, from Persian : "Solomon 's throne") peak in Khyber Pakhtunkhwa, Pakistan
- Takht-e-Sulaiman, Sulayman Mountain, peak in Osh, Kyrgyzstan
- Throne of Solomon (Srinagar), Takht-i-Sulaiman, temple ruin near Dal Lake, Shrinagar associated with Ahmadi claims of Jesus in India.
- Takht-e Soleimani of Fath-Ali Shah, Qajar Iran

The Peacock Throne of Shah Jahan was commissioned to underscore his position as the just king.

== Dar al-Hadith (Kursi Sulaiman) or Station of King Solomon ==
This was probably built to commemorate Sulaiman (Solomon). It is located within the Temple Mount plaza, which supports its eastern wall. The building itself is undated, but is a mid-16th century foundation, as the shape of the two shallow domes covering the building are associated with the Ottoman period.

The facade of Sulaiman's tomb in al-Aqsa enclave. A cavetto frieze situated above the mihrab is identical to one found over the mihrab in the al-'Imara al-'Amira complex (959/1552), suggesting that Kursi Sulaiman (the 'throne of Solomon') was built around that time. The building has three facades visible from the Temple Mount and the eastern facade is integrated in the eastern wall of Haram al-Sharif compound. A marble slab inspect over the main northern entrance to the structure has the first verse of Surah Isra mentioning the Night Journey of Muhammad. It was decorated with Surah Neml Verse 30 "Indeed, it is from Solomon, and indeed, it reads: 'In the name of Allah, the Entirely Merciful, the Especially Merciful".

== See also ==
- Walls of Jerusalem National Park with Solomon's Throne peak
- Takht-e-Soleiman (disambiguation)
