= Shaneh-Kuh =

Mountain in Iran

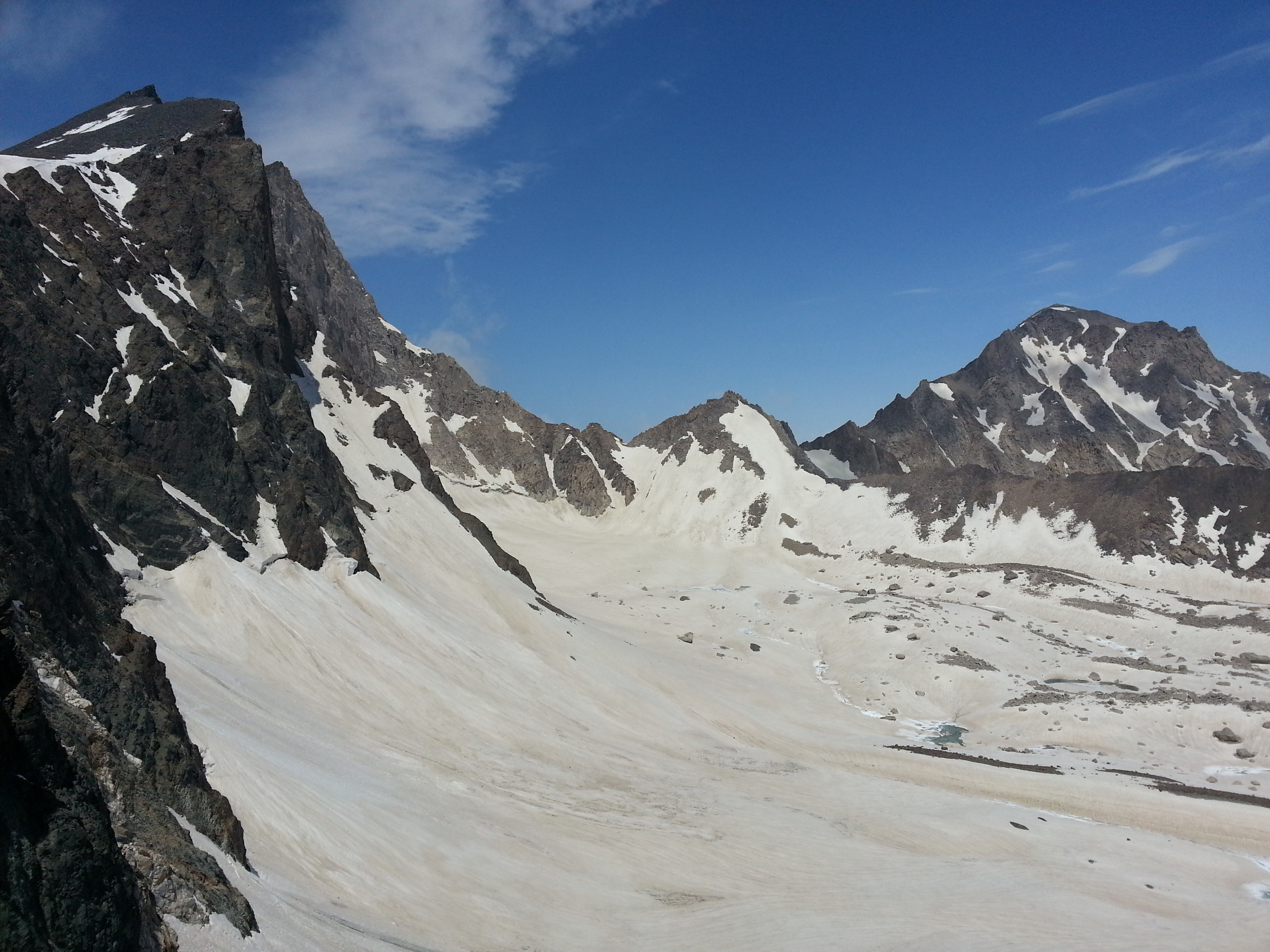
- Shaneh-Kuh summit, (the shortest peak)

Highest point
- Elevation: 4,465 m (14,649 ft)
- Coordinates: 36°22′56.5″N 50°57′43.7″E

Geography
- Location within Iran
- Location: Māzandarān, Iran
- Parent range: Alborz

Climbing
- Easiest route: Hike

Shaneh-Kuh (Persian: شانه کوه, lit. 'Shoulder Mountain') is a mountain in the Takht-e Suleyman Massif, Alborz mountain range, in northern Iran.

With an elevation of 4,465 meters, it is located between mount Alam-Kuh and Mount Takht-e Suleyman.

== See also ==
- List of Iranian four-thousanders
