= Heilig-Geist-Spital =

Former hospital in Nuremberg, Germany

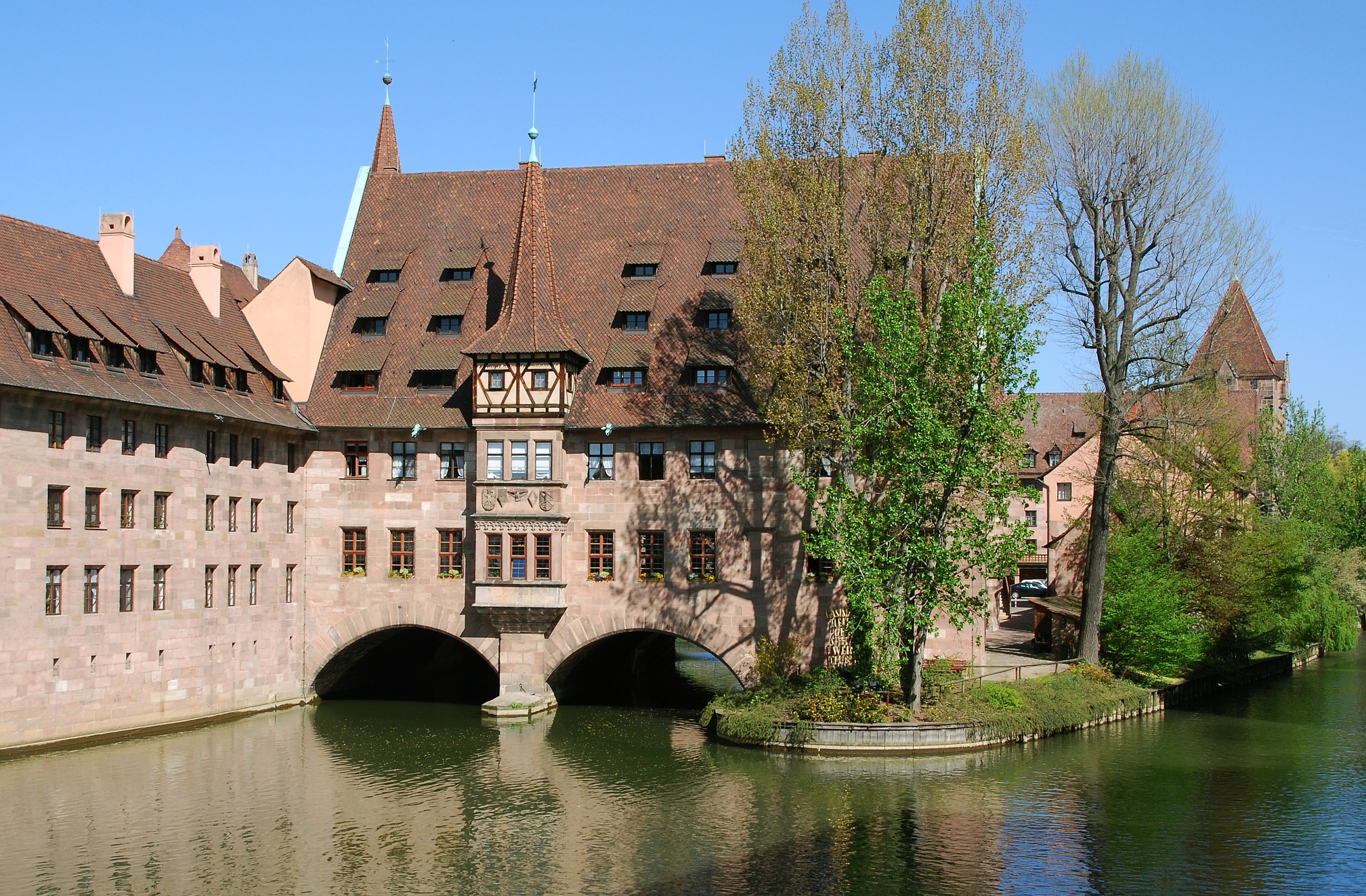
View of the Heilig-Geist-Spital from the west

The Heilig-Geist-Spital (English: Holy Spirit Hospital) in Nuremberg was the largest hospital in the former Free Imperial City of Nuremberg. It was used as a hospital and nursing home.

Its chapel was also the depository of the Imperial Regalia, the crown jewels of the Holy Roman Empire, between 1424 and 1796. The regalia, among them the Holy Lance, were shown to believers once a year in a so-called Heiltumsweisung (worship show) on the fourteenth day after Good Friday. For coronations they were brought to Frankfurt Cathedral.

The hospital was partly built over the Pegnitz river. It now serves as a restaurant and senior home.

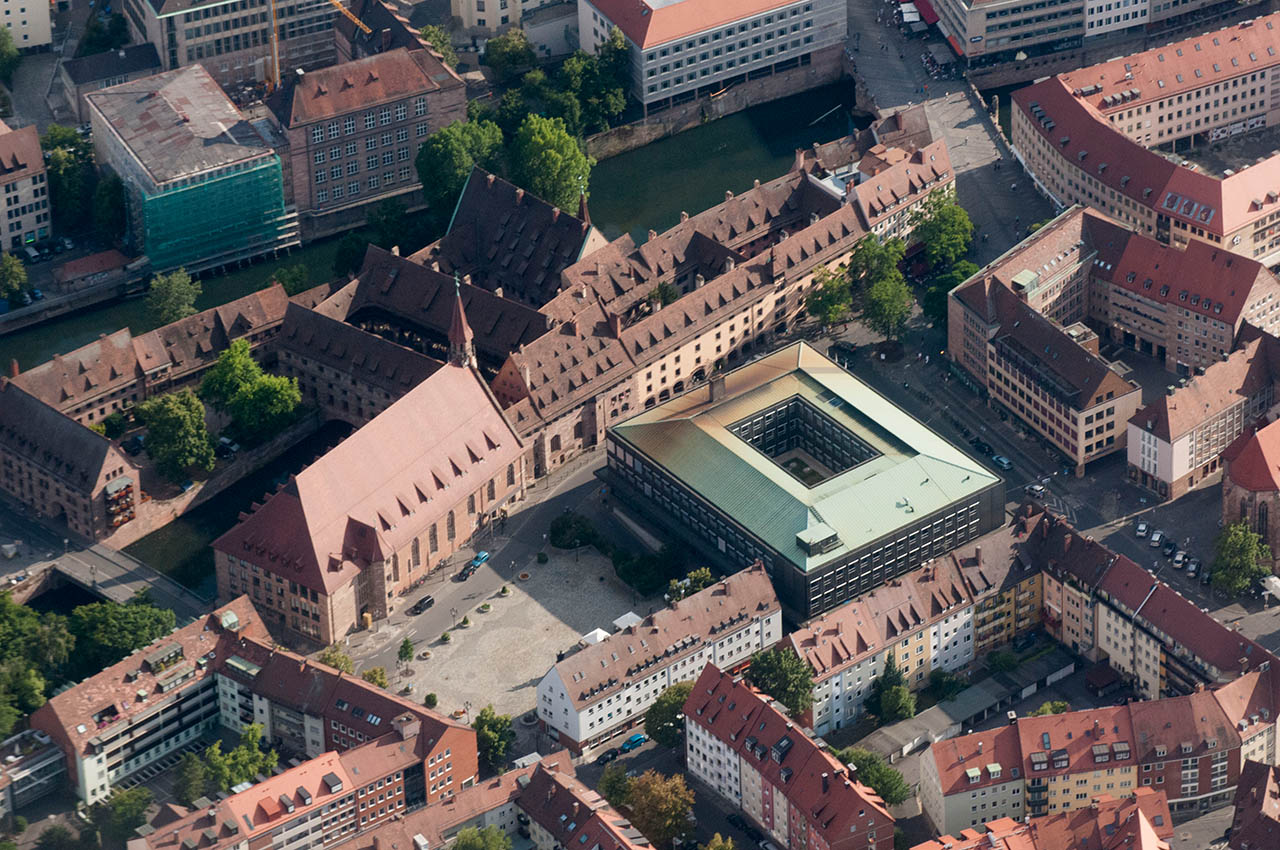
Aerial view, with the hospital buildings extending along the Pegnitz river, and the Holy Ghost chapel to the left

== History ==
The Heilig-Geist-Spital was built in 1339 by Konrad Gross to care for ill, elderly and poor people.
