= Katharinenkirche, Nuremberg =

Church in Nuremberg, Middle Franconia, Germany

Coordinates: 49°27′06″N 11°04′55″E

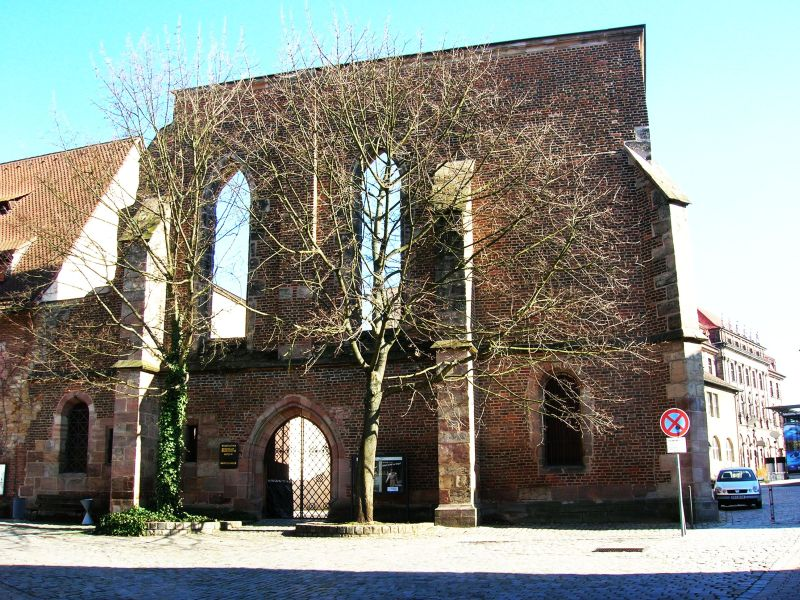
Ruins of the former church of St. Catherine's

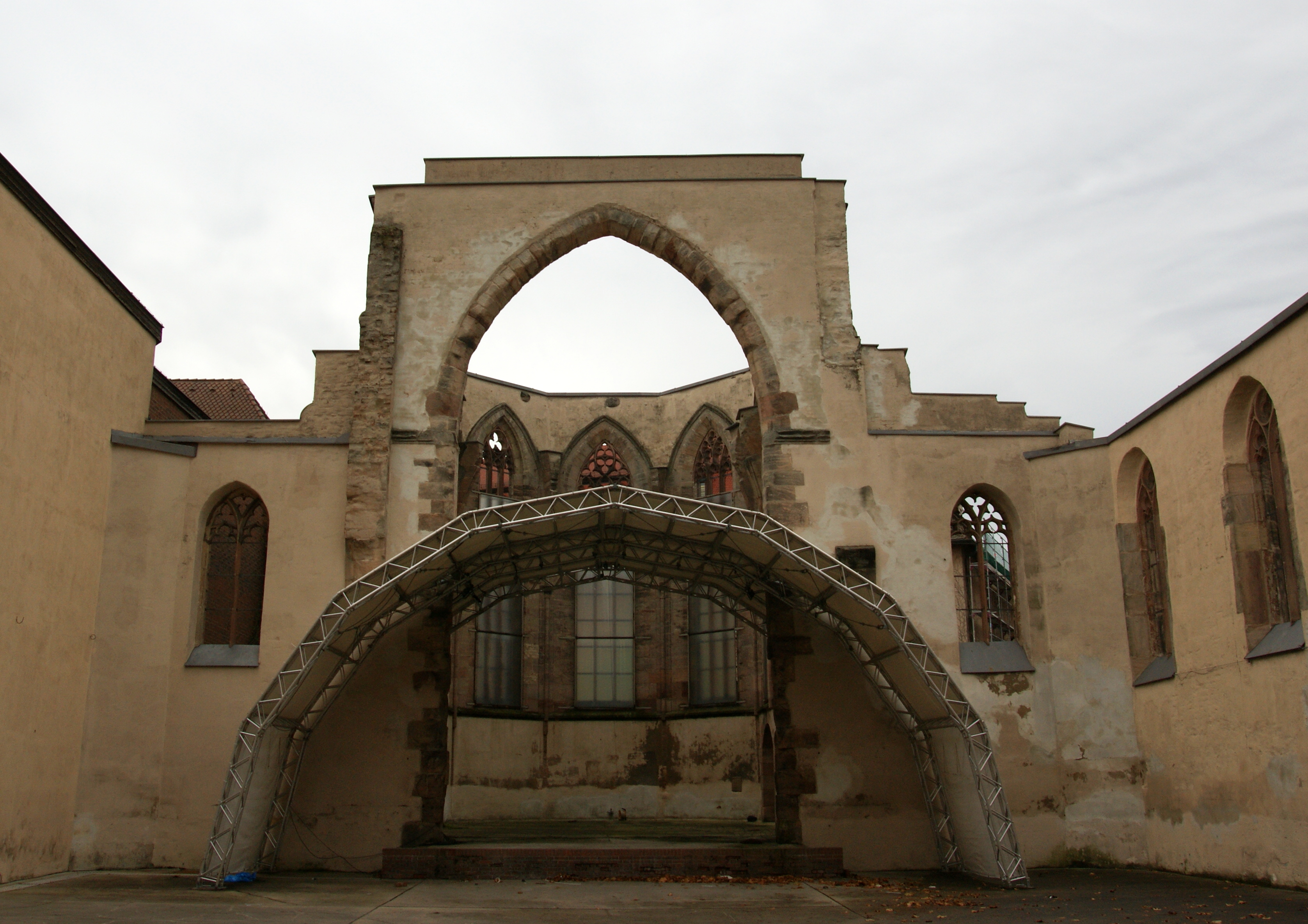
Interior

St. Katharina (St. Catherine's Church) in Nuremberg, Bavaria, was an important medieval church, destroyed during the Second World War and preserved as a ruin.

== History ==
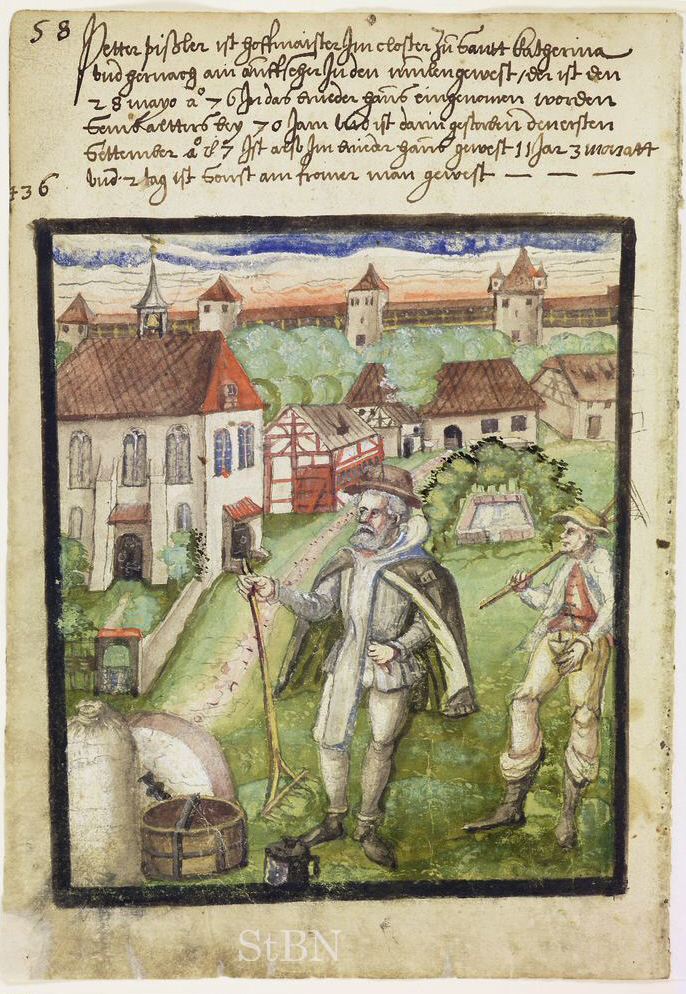
Illustration from 1587

St. Catherine's was the church of a former Dominican convent, in the Diocese of Bamberg, famous for its medieval library. It was founded in 1295 by Konrad von Neumarkt and his wife Adelheid, patricians of the Pfinzig family. In the Middle Ages it had an important medieval library. After the Reformation, it became a Lutheran church. The convent was closed in 1596 after the last inhabitant died.

The church was associated with the Meistersingers who met there from 1620 to 1778. Although Katharinenkirche is the location of the opening scene of Richard Wagner's opera Die Meistersinger von Nürnberg, unbeknownst to Wagner, Meistersingers did not historically meet there during the opera's setting in the mid-sixteenth century.

After the invasion of Austria in 1938 and the Anschluss annexing the Austrian Federal State, the crown of the Holy Roman Emperor was taken as plunder and stored here in Nuremberg, until it was transferred to a bunker for the duration of the war.

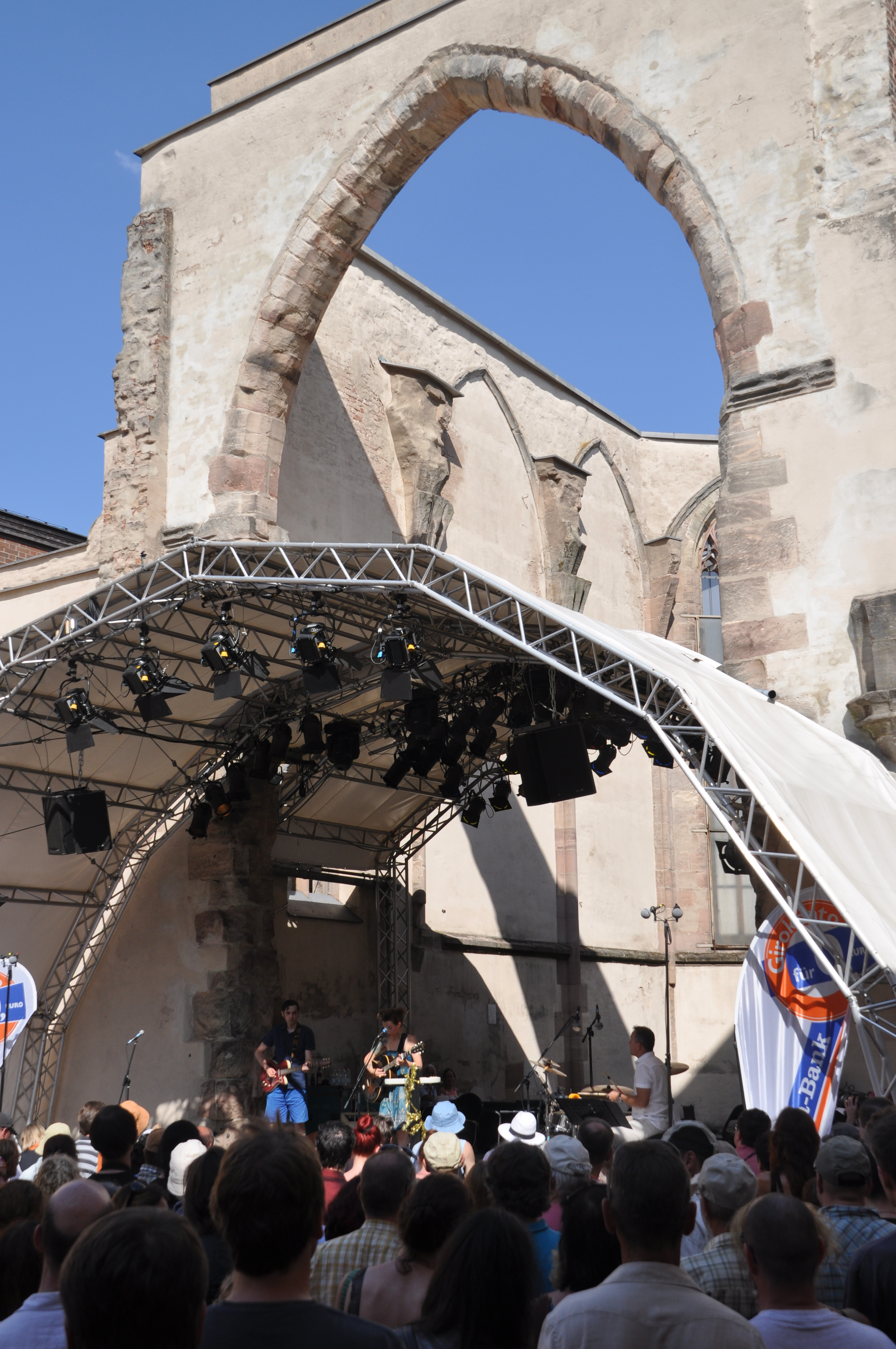
Concert in the ruins, 2013

Although destroyed by air raids in 1945, it was partially restored (1970–71) and is used for events such as open-air concerts.

== Bibliography ==
- Lee, Patrick (2014). "The Mastersingers of Nuremberg and St Catherine's Church".
