= St. Stephen's Purse =

9th-century reliquary

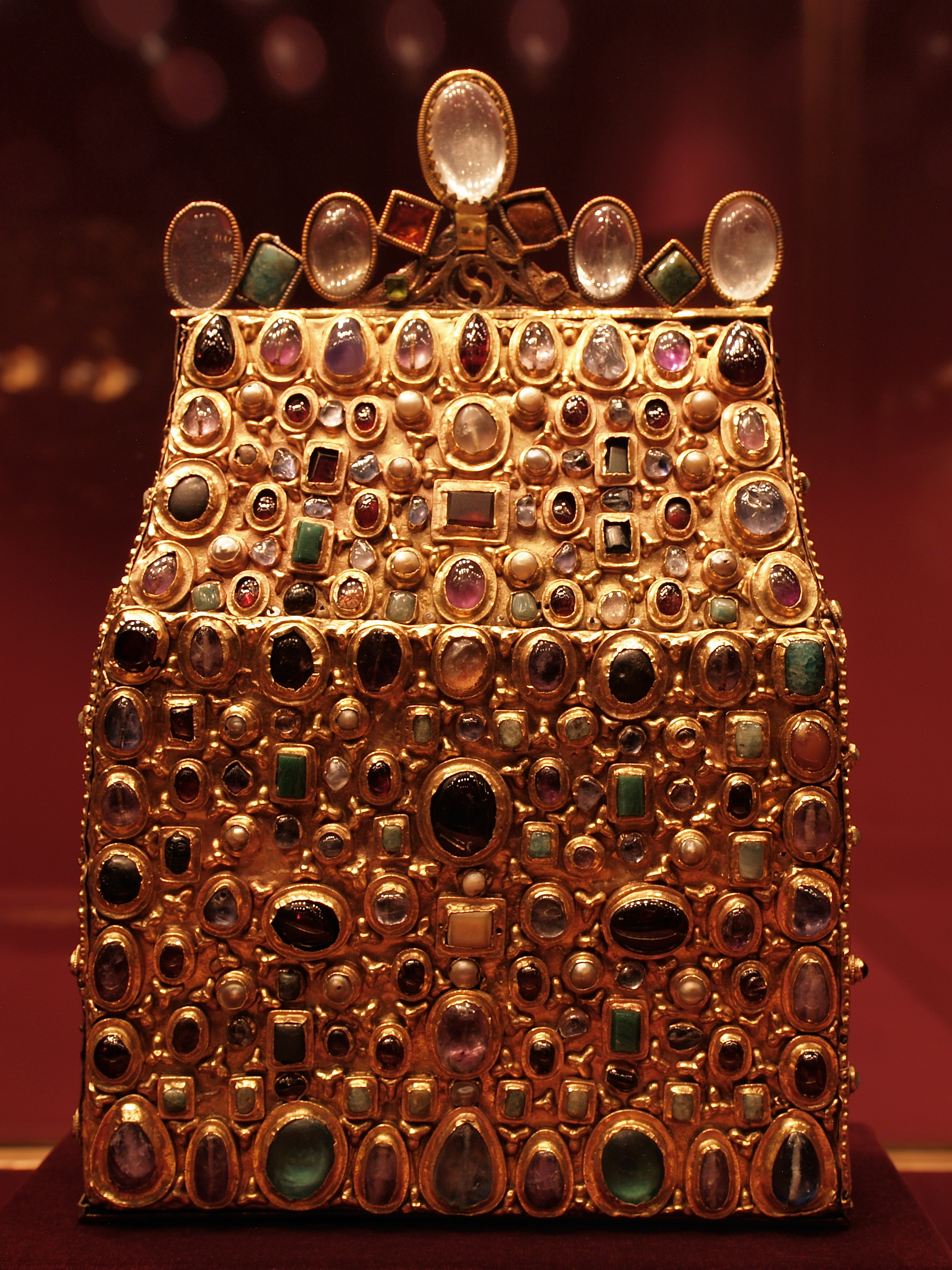

Saint Stephen's Purse (Latin: Sacculum idem Sanctus Stephanus, German: Stephansbursa or Stephansburse) is a rectangular gold 9th-century reliquary studded with gem stones. It is part of the Imperial Regalia of the Holy Roman Empire.

It consists of a purse containing soil that is claimed to be soaked with the blood of St. Stephen. It is held in the Imperial Treasury Museum in Vienna.

== Overview ==
The reliquary was created circa 830 and is 32 cm tall.

It was believed that the purse had been kept in the church of San Lorenzo fuori le mura in Rome, until Pope Leo III gave it to Charlemagne. Traditionally the purse was used during coronations in the Palatine Chapel in Aachen where it would be placed in a specially created niche in Charlemagne's marble-slab throne.

The purse originally had a core made from willow wood where the relics were kept. It was created using gold foil with pearls and precious stones.

The stones are arranged at the front so that they outline the purse into a box with a roof. Five more stones are arranged as a crux gemmata. A variety of stones complete the artwork. The sides of the purse are worked with gold foil and show representations of hunters, fishermen, falconers and a goddess of vengeance. The back of the purse was originally similar to the sides, but at the start of the 19th century, it was recovered with gilt silver foil.
