= Historischer Kunstbunker =

Coordinates: 49°27′24″N 11°04′31″E

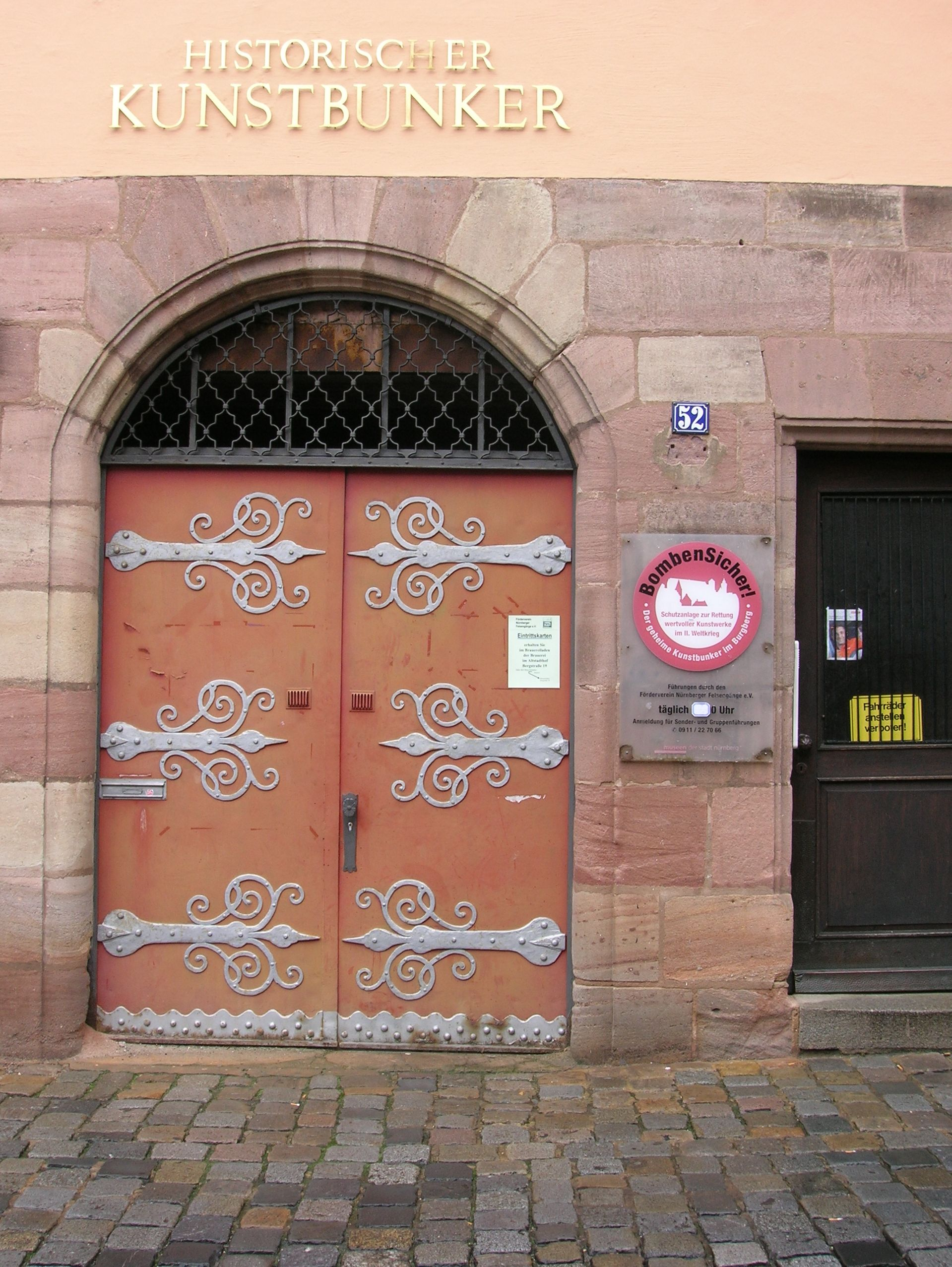
Historischer Kunstbunker: Entrance

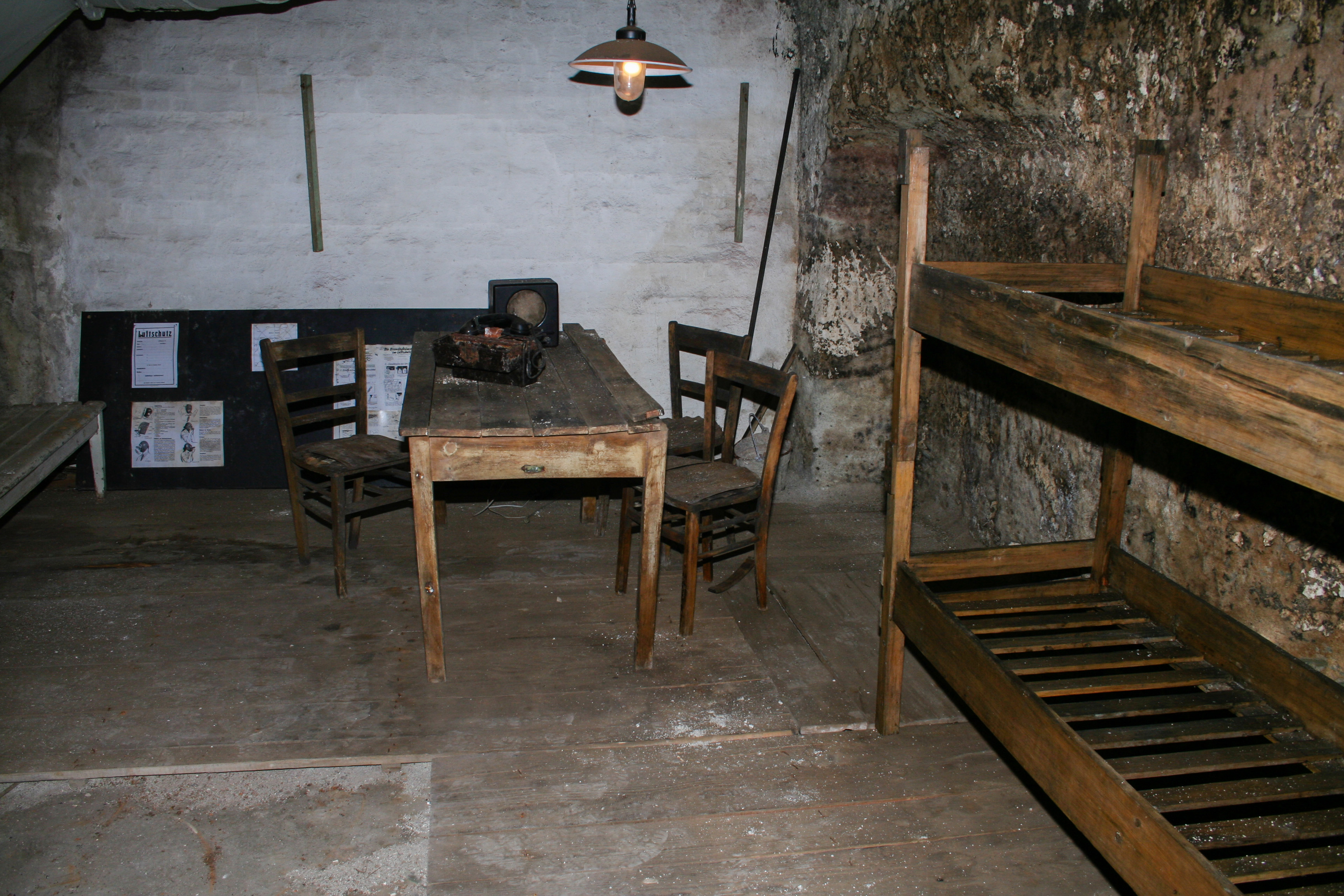
Historischer Kunstbunker: Guardroom

Historischer Kunstbunker

The Historische Kunstbunker (Historic art bunker) is a tunnel complex under Nuremberg Castle in the old city of Nuremberg, southern Germany. It forms part of the Nuremberg Historic Mile.

In the Middle Ages, a network of rock passages was built in the hard sandstone of the castle. In the summer of 1940 the stone cellar of 52 Obere Schmiedgasse street was renovated for the protection of Nuremberg's artworks from Allied WWII air raids. The Neutorturm was also used as an art bunker from 1941 and the Paniersbunker under Paniersplatz from 1943.

The construction regulated heating, ventilation, and drainage; the bunker extended 24 metres down and offered optimal conditions. There were also facilities for the guards. Contents included:

- Veit Stoss' Annunciation from St. Lorenz
- The Altarpiece of Veit Stoss
- The Imperial Regalia
- The Automaton clock from the Frauenkirche
- The Erdapfel
- The Codex Manesse
- Works of Albrecht Dürer
- Historic musical instruments, scientific implements and clock mechanisms
- Furniture and windows from the churches of the old city.

Since 1994, there has been an organisation called Kunstbunker – forum für zeitgenössische kunst, which organises exhibitions of contemporary art in another Second World War bunker in Nuremberg. This bunker is located under the construction yard, near the Kunsthalle Nürnberg.

== Bibliography ==
- Georg Wolfgang Schramm (2000), Michael Diefenbacher, Rudolf Endres (ed.), Kunstbunker, Nuremberg City Lexicon (Stadtlexikon Nürnberg) (in German) (2nd, revised ed.), Nuremberg: W. Tümmels Verlag, ISBN 3-921590-69-8
