= Mount Takht-e Suleyman =

Mountain in Māzandarān, Iran

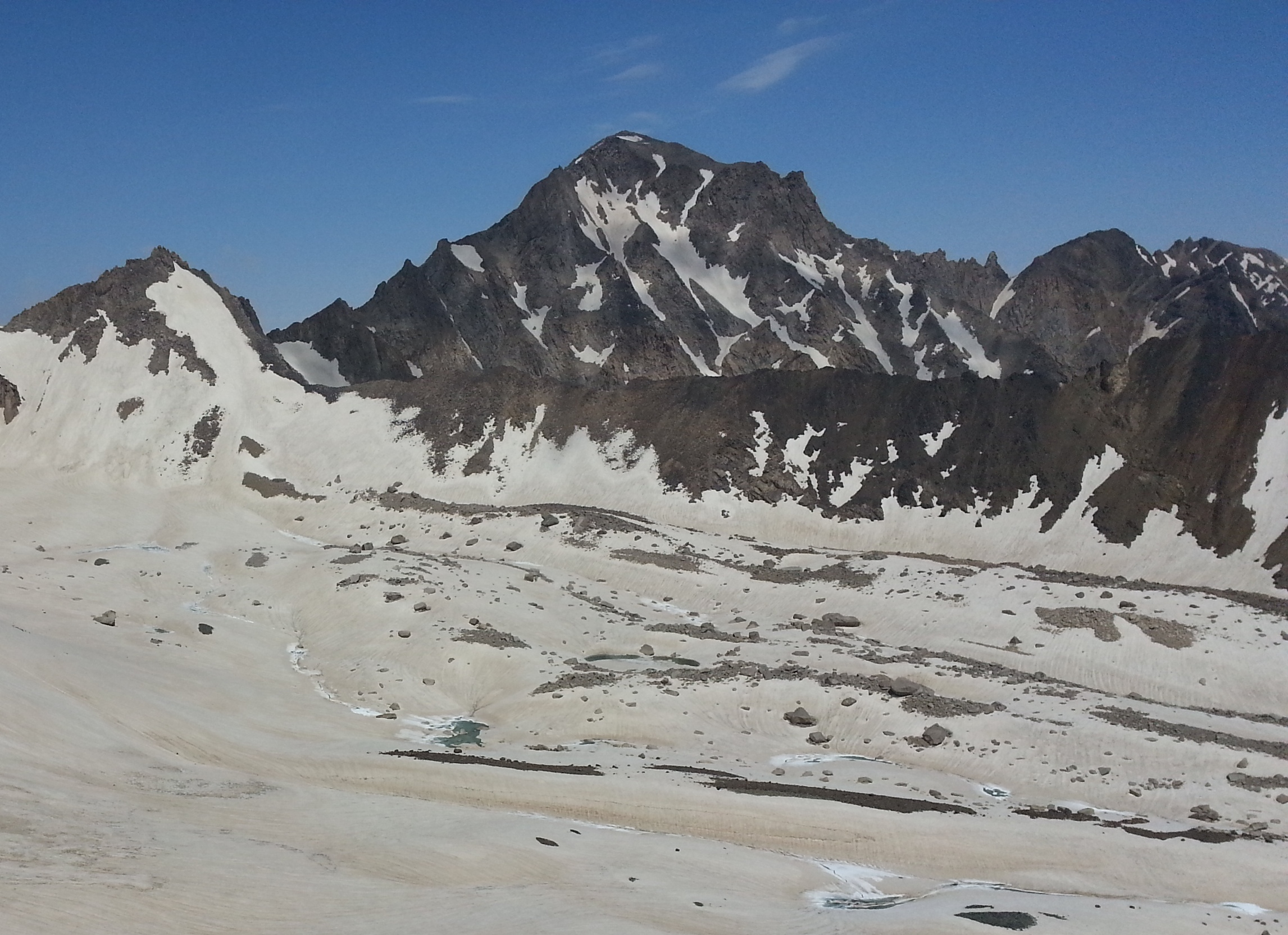
- Takht-e-Soleiman summit

Highest point
- Elevation: 4,659 m (15,285 ft)
- Coordinates: 36°23′27″N 50°57′37″E

Geography
- Location within Iran
- Location: Māzandarān, Iran
- Parent range: Alborz

Climbing
- Easiest route: Hike

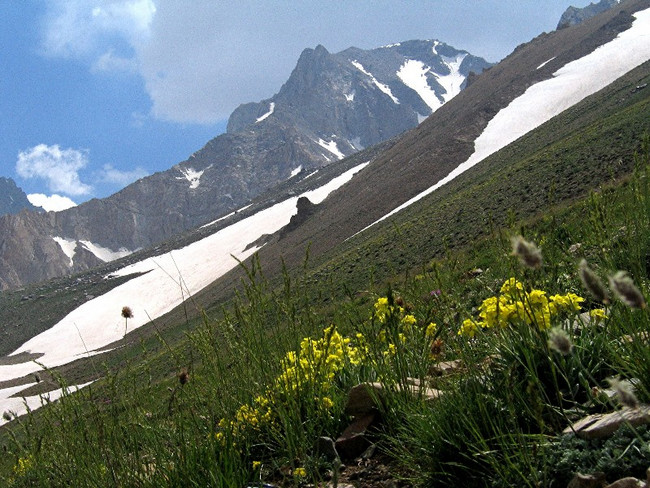

Takhte Soleyman or Takht-e Suleyman (Persian: تخت سلیمان) is a mountain in the Takht-e Suleyman Massif, Alborz mountain range, north of Iran. In Persian language, Takhte Soleyman means Solomon's Throne (seat).

In August 1931, the British explorer Freya Stark attempted to reach the summit of Takht-i-Suleiman, and documented her travels in 'The Valleys of the Assassins and other Persian Travels'.

== See also ==
- List of Iranian four-thousanders
