= Qasr-e Abunasr =

Archaeological site in Shiraz, Iran

- قصر ابونصر (Persian)
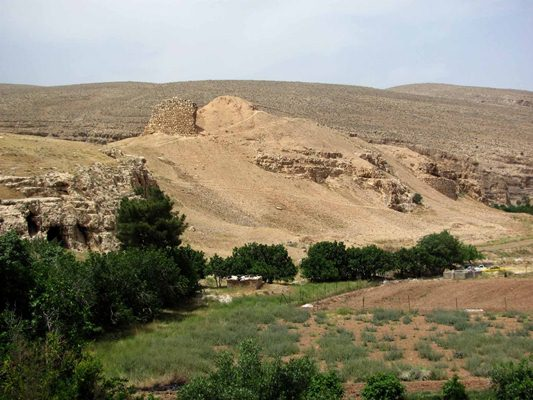
- Qasr-e Abunasr, 2011
- Interactive map of Qasr-e Abunasr
- 29.5844°N 52.6252°E
- Location: Shiraz

Iran National Heritage List
- Official name: Qasr-e Abunasr
- Type: Ruins
- Designated: 1931
- Reference no.: 13
- Conservation organization: Cultural Heritage, Handicrafts and Tourism Organization of Iran

Qaṣr-e Abu Naṣr (Persian: قصر ابونصر, lit. 'Abu-Naṣr Palace'), also Qasr-i Abunasr, or Takht-e Soleyman (Persian: تخت سلیمان, lit. 'Throne of Solomon') is the site of an ancient settlement situated in city of Shiraz in the Fars province of Iran.

According to archaeological studies the fortress was built during the Parthian era, and was an important and strategic location in the Sasanian era. Archaeologists have found various artifacts and coins belonging to various historical periods, such as the Achaemenid, Seleucid, Parthian, and Sasanian eras. This site is recorded in an Iranian historical list from 1932 as "Takht-e Soleyman" (Throne of Solomon). When Muslims invaded Iran, and conquered it, they called this palace "Father of Victory" (Qaṣr-i-Abu Naṣr).

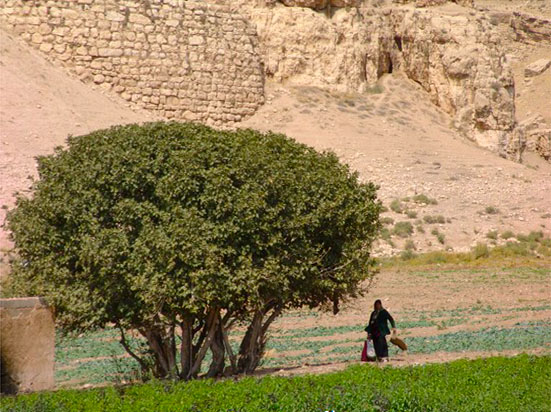
Qasr-e Abunasr, 2014

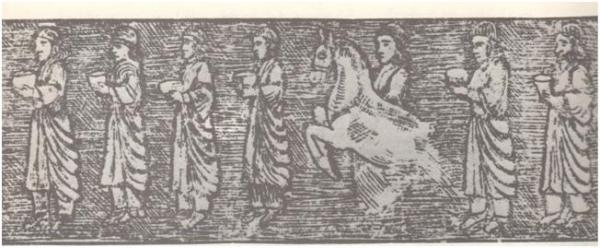
Qasr-e Abunasr: Pasargad

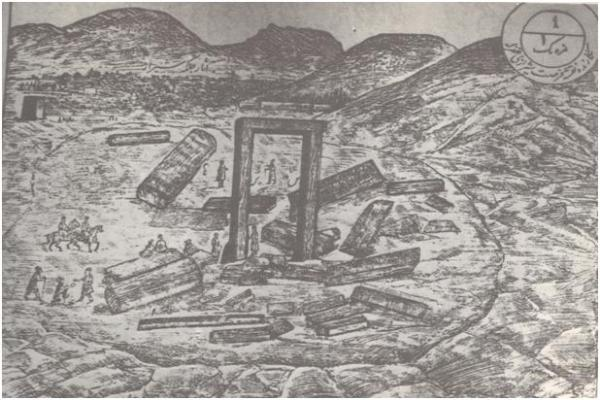
Qasr-e Abunasr: Pasargad

== Name of Shiraz ==
One of the palaces in this site was named Shiraz, from which the city derives its name.
