= Orphan Stone =

Orphan Stone can refer to:

- Al-Yatīma, a pearl associated with the crown jewels of the Abbasids
- Der Weise, a precious stone associated with the crown jewels of the medieval Holy Roman Emperors
