= Imperial Crowns of Charles VII =

Crowns of Charles VII
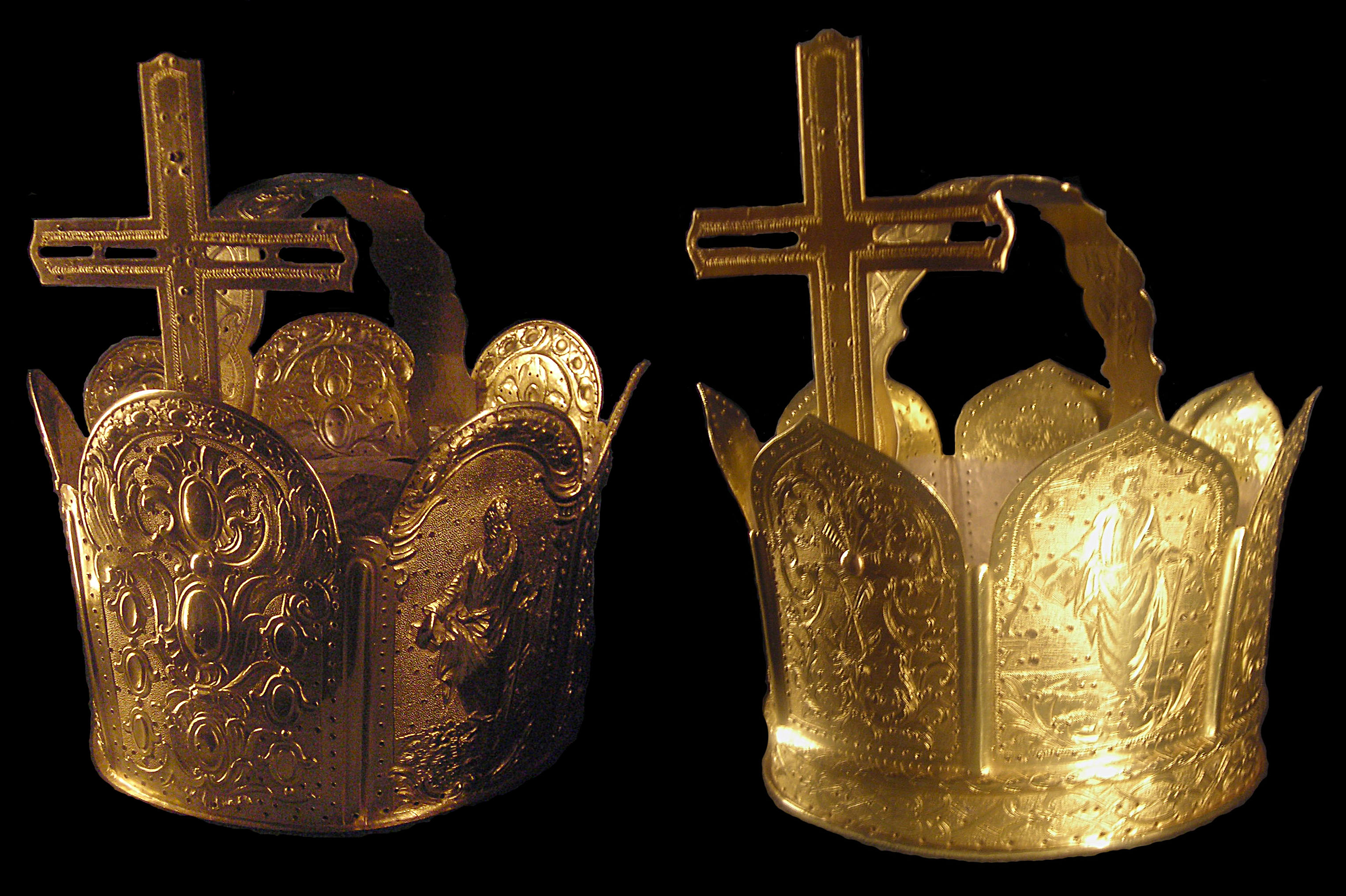
- The imperial crowns of Charles VII at the treasury of Munich Residenz, Augsburg Crown (Left), Frankfurter Crown (right)

Details
- Country: Germany
- Material: Silver-gilt
- Notable stones: None

The Imperial Crowns of Charles VII are kept in the treasury at the Munich Residenz. Since the imperial crown was merely used as coronation crown, the Holy Roman Emperors used different crowns for all other purposes. While the Habsburgs were in possession of their own imperial crowns, Charles VII did not possess an imperial crown when he was elected emperor in 1742. Thus, he ordered a crown from a goldsmith in Augsburg and one from another artisan in Frankfurt am Main.

Augsburgian Crown	Frankfurtian Crown
