= Imperial Crown of the Holy Roman Empire =

Crown worn by the Holy Roman Emperor

Coordinates: 48.206507°N 16.365262°E

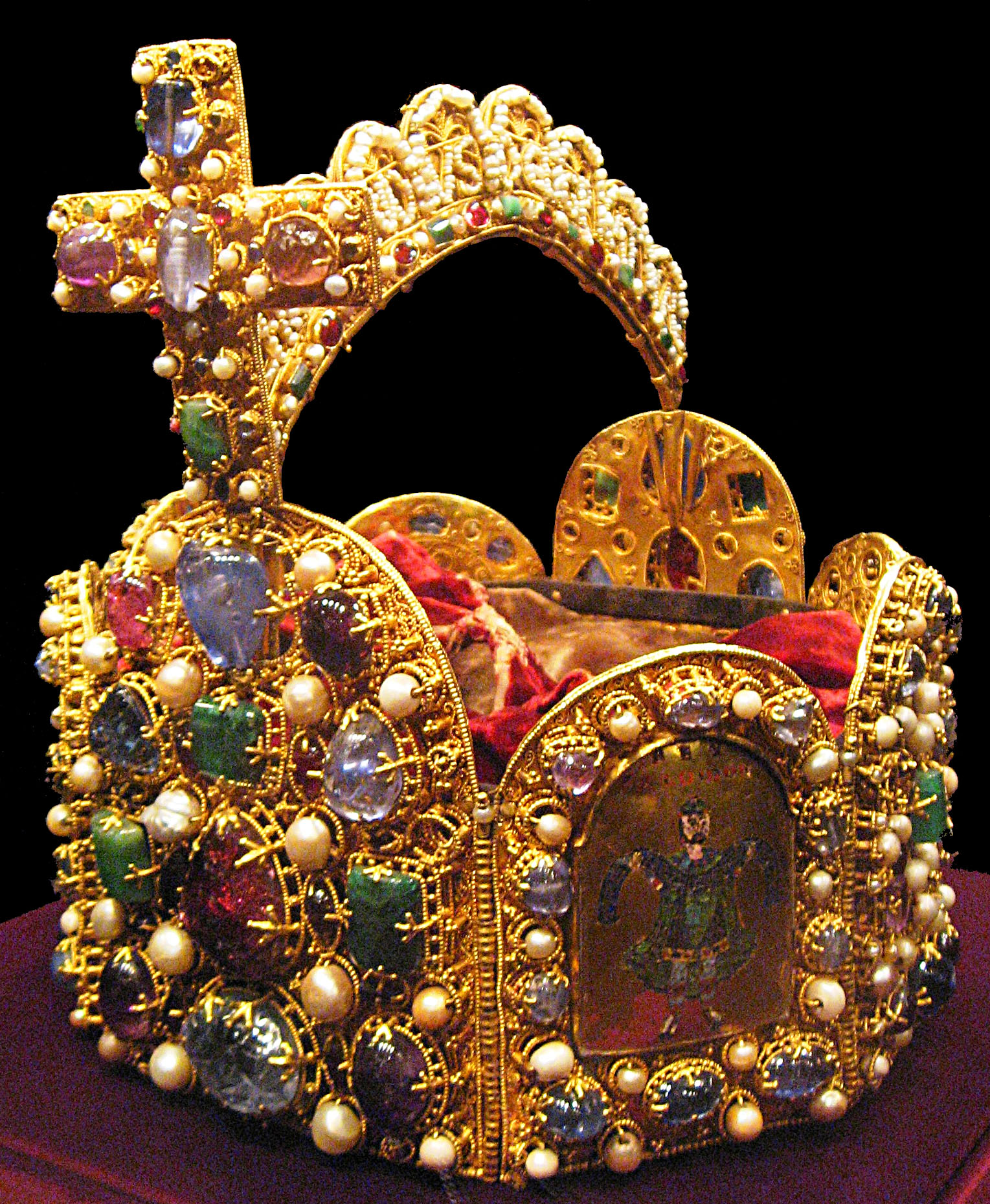

Heraldic depictions

Details
- Country: Holy Roman Empire
- Made: c. 962
- Owner: Imperial Treasury
- Arches: None
- Material: Gold
- Cap: Red
- Notable stones: Sapphires, emeralds, pearls
- Successors: Imperial Crown of Austria

The Imperial Crown of the Holy Roman Empire (German: Reichskrone), a hoop crown (Bügelkrone) with a characteristic octagonal shape, was the coronation crown of the Holy Roman Emperor, probably from the late 10th century until the dissolution of the Holy Roman Empire in 1806. The crown was used in the coronation of the King of the Romans, the title assumed by the Emperor-elect immediately after his election. It is now kept in the Imperial Treasury (Kaiserliche Schatzkammer) at the Hofburg in Vienna, Austria.

== History ==
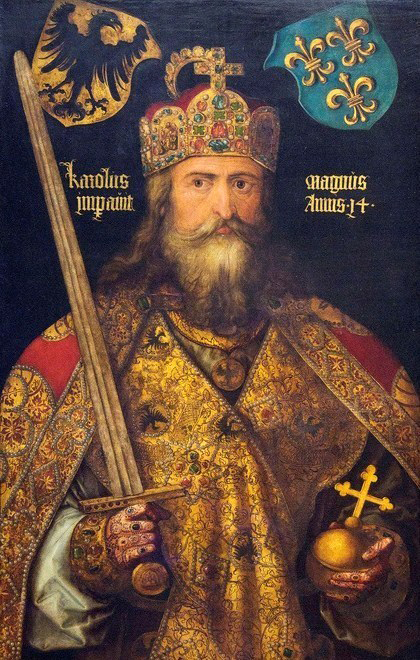
Charlemagne wearing the Imperial Crown, by Albrecht Dürer, c. 1512, Germanisches Nationalmuseum in Nuremberg. The picture is anachronistic, since the crown was made at least a century and a half after Charlemagne's death, and originally had a simpler form.

The crown of eight hinged golden plates was probably made in Western Germany for the Imperial coronation of Otto I in 962, with what must be later additions which may have been made for Conrad II (since the arch is inscribed with the name CHVONRADUS). However, some medieval historians argue that the crown may have been commissioned at a later date. Whilst acknowledging that the crown is "dated most frequently as a work of the second half of the tenth century", John B. Freed states that "the inscriptions on the plaques have been dated for paleographical reasons as no earlier than the second half of the eleventh century". The biblical verses that appear on three of the four plaques "were first cited in royal charters only in the late eleventh and twelfth centuries". Freed therefore proposes that the crown was made in preparation for the imperial coronation of Conrad III in Rome (although Conrad was ultimately never crowned as emperor). He also cites as evidence the title that appears on the crown, which is identical to how Conrad was styled in a "letter he sent in 1142 to the Byzantine emperor" John II Komnenos, and claims that "the selection of the otherwise odd text from Isaiah 38:5 on the Hezekiah plaque makes the most sense if Conrad commissioned the crown", since he had become "seriously ill during the Second Crusade" and was suffering from tertian malaria, which "hindered him ... from carrying out his responsibilities from the end of August 1149 until April 1150." On the other hand, Reinhard Staats has "interpreted the Isaiah text as a reminder to every monarch that his days were numbered", while Denise A. Kaiser "argued that Otto II commissioned the crown and that the Hezekiah plaque refers to Otto I's recovery from a serious illness." The earliest known mention of the crown dates from the 12th century, assuming (as is probable) that it is the same crown.

Most Kings of the Romans were crowned with it until the end of the Holy Roman Empire. The crown was the most important item of the Imperial Regalia (German: Reichskleinodien), which also included the Imperial Cross (German: Reichskreuz), the Imperial Sword (German: Reichsschwert), and the Holy Lance (German: Heilige Lanze). During the coronation, it was given to the new king along with the sceptre (German: Reichszepter) and the Imperial Orb (German: Reichsapfel).

=== Heraldic crown of the German Empire ===
Heraldic crown of the German Empire

The Imperial Crown was the inspiration for the German State Crown designed in 1871 for the arms of the German Empire and its Emperor. This new design had four half-arches supporting a small orb and cross, rather than the single arch and front cross of the original. The changes were made to differentiate the Wilhelmine crown from the one kept in Vienna (outside the German Empire), while simultaneously invoking the powerful legacy of the Holy Roman Empire. A now-lost wooden model was made, but no actual crown was produced until the Empire's demise in 1918. As a result it remained a heraldic crown only, even though it was also represented as if a real crown existed on that model, e.g. at the Niederwalddenkmal (1871-1883), in Hermann Wislicenus's "Apotheose of Empire" painting at the Imperial Palace of Goslar (c. 1880), or on the Weidendammer Bridge in Berlin (1896).

=== Preservation ===
The Crown was held in various locations during the first few centuries after its creation, including Limburg Abbey, Harzburg Castle, the Imperial Palace of Goslar, Trifels Castle, the Imperial Palace of Haguenau, Waldburg Castle, Krautheim Castle, Kyburg Castle, Rheinfelden Castle, and the Alter Hof in Munich.

In 1349, Charles IV took the Imperial Regalia to the Karlstein Castle near Prague, which he had just built for that purpose. in 1424, with Bohemia suffering the troubles of the Hussite Wars, Sigismund had them relocated to Visegrád and then to Nuremberg, where they were permanently kept in the Heilig-Geist-Spital except for the time of coronations (in Aachen until 1531, then in Frankfurt from 1562).

In 1796, as the war with revolutionary France was threatening the entire fabric of the Empire, the Regalia were brought for safety to Saint Emmeram's Abbey in Regensburg, and from there in 1800 to the Imperial capital in Vienna, where the Empire was abolished on 6 August 1806.

The crown and other Regalia remained in Vienna until the Anschluss of March 1938, when they were brought back to Nuremberg (this time in the Katharinenkirche) by Nazi Germany in line with their promotion of the city as repository of mythicized ancient German traditions. During World War II the crown was placed in the Historischer Kunstbunker, an underground vault of Nuremberg Castle.

Led by art historian Lt. Walter Horn, who joined the US military after becoming a naturalized citizen, American soldiers recovered the treasures in August 1945. They were returned to the Österreichische Nationalbank in allied-occupied Austria in January 1946. They have been kept permanently in Vienna since that date. The Crown and Regalia were again on display at the Hofburg in 1954. The current display dates from a comprehensive refurbishment of the Hofburg's Treasury Vault in 1983-1987.

== Design ==
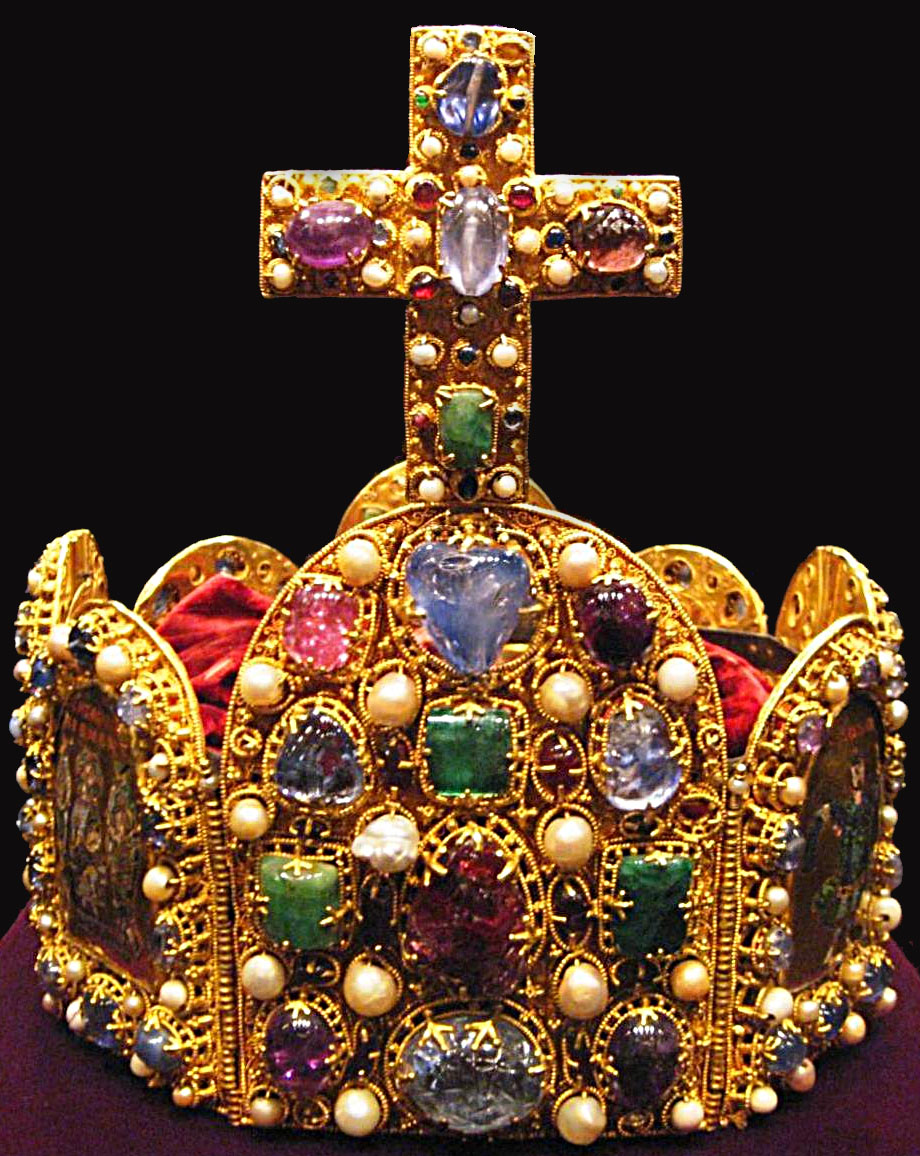
Front view

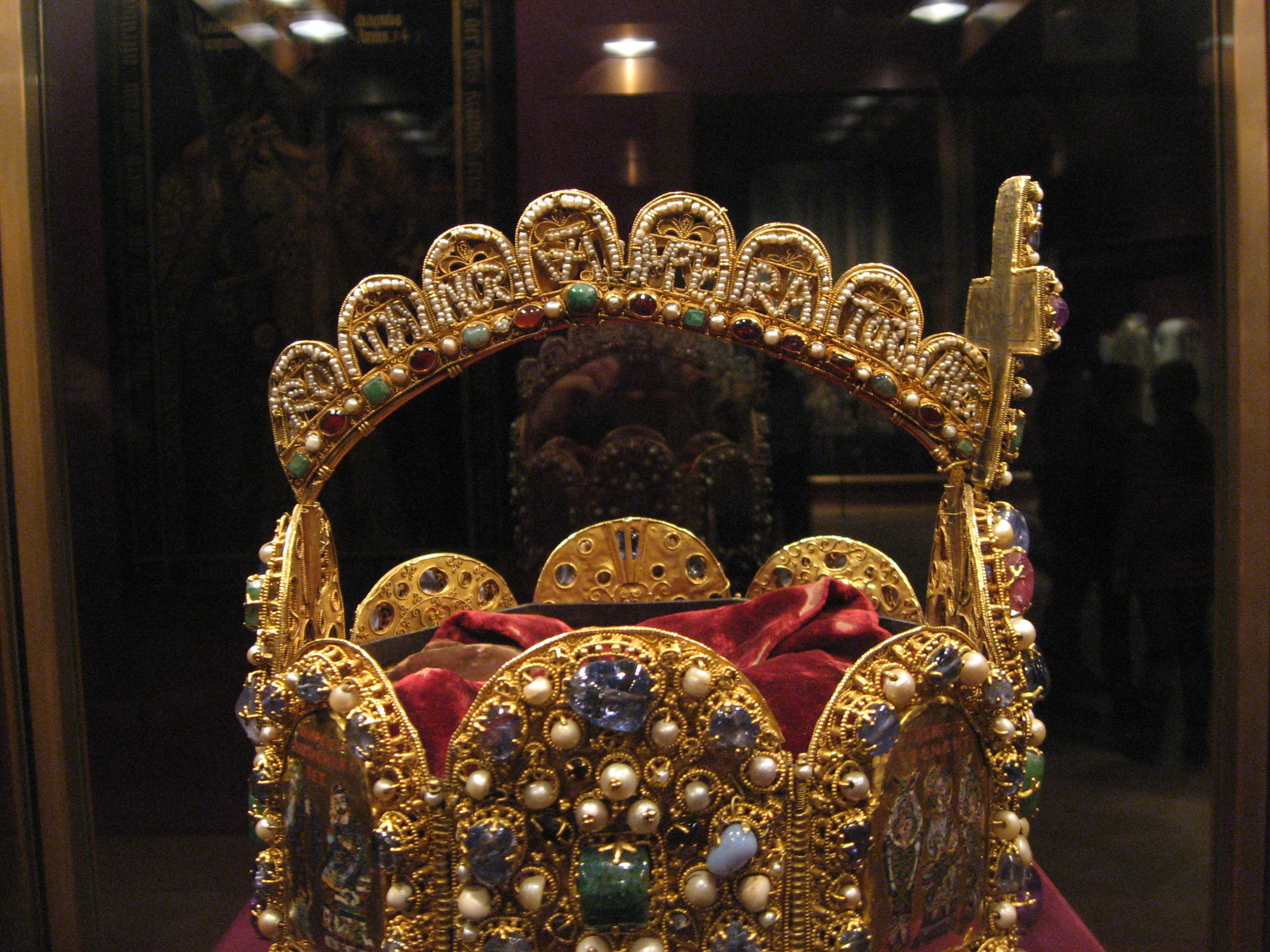
Right side

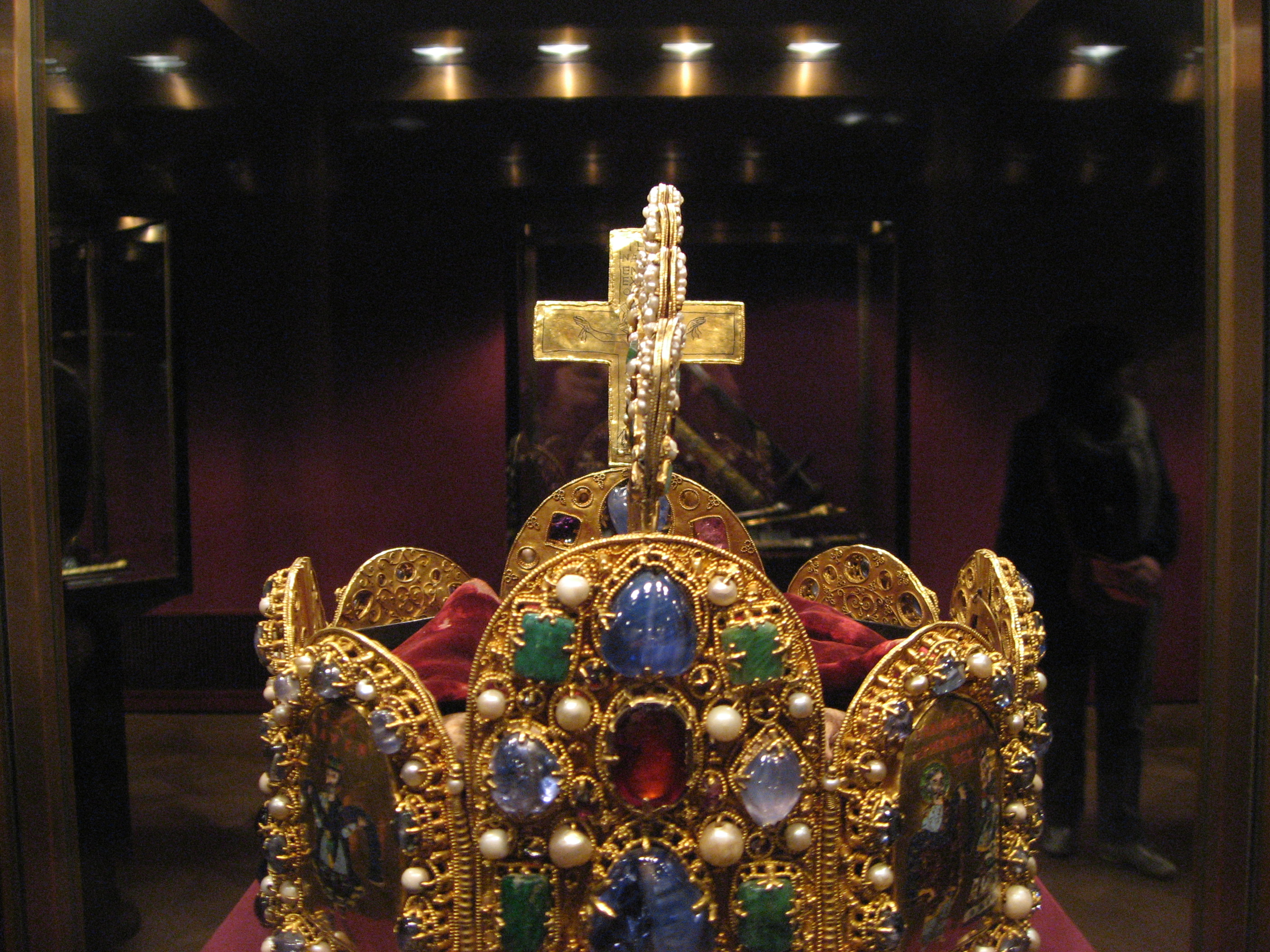
Rear

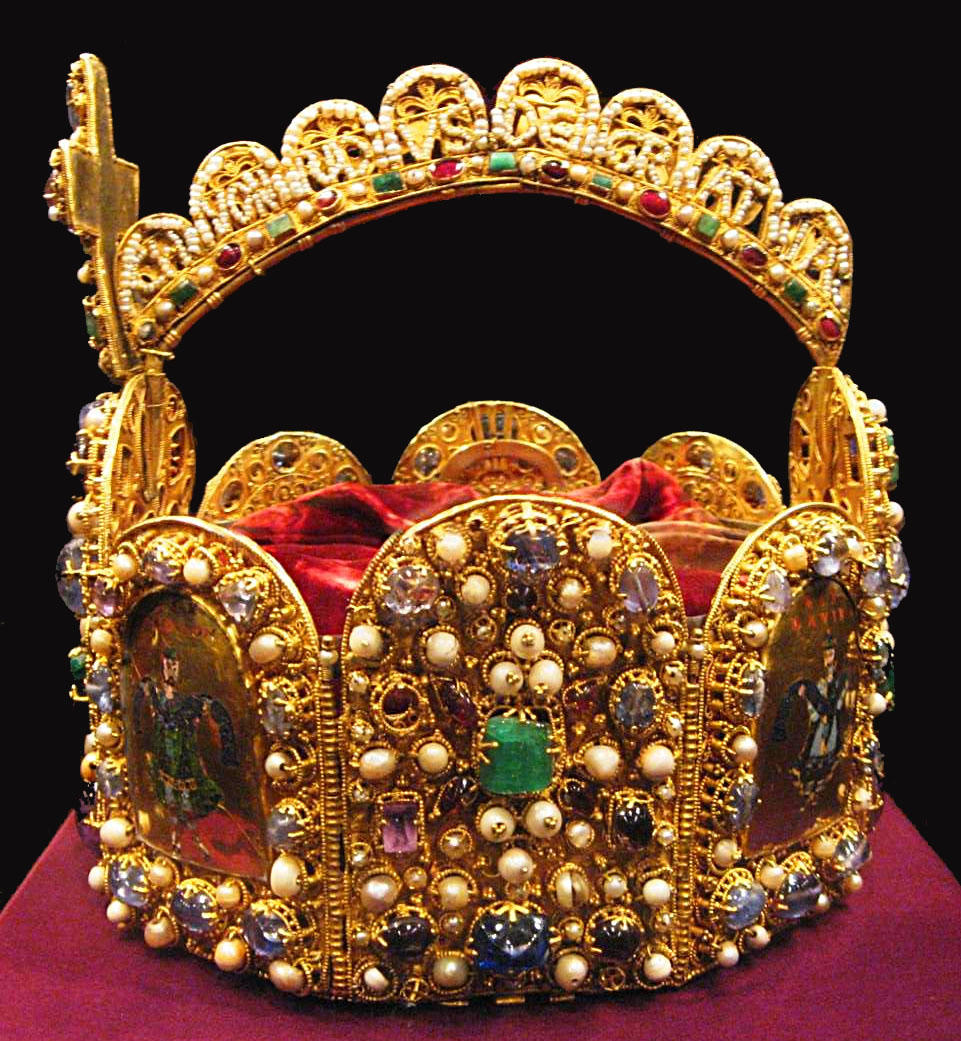
Left side

The crown does not have a round shape but an octagonal one, a possible reference to the shape of crowns of Byzantine emperors and/or of Charlemagne's Palatine Chapel in Aachen. Its eight hinged plates are arched at the top. Two strips of iron of unidentified date, riveted with golden rivets to the plates, hold the crown together. Before the addition of the rings the plates were held together by long golden pins, which made it possible to separate the plates and the arch for easier transport.

Each plate of the crown is made out of a high carat gold, around 22 carats, which gives the crown a "buttery" colour, and is studded with pearls and precious stones. The stones are not cut into facets (a technique still unknown when the crown was made), but polished into rounded shapes and fixed en cabochon, i.e. put into openings that were cut into the metal, and fastened with thin wires. The effect is that when light shines in, the stones look as if they would shine from within.

The crown is decorated with 144 precious stones including sapphires, emeralds and amethysts (blue, green and purple precious stones being proper to emperors in Byzantine imperial protocol), and about the same number of pearls. Similar gem-studded decoration was used for other precious objects of the early and high Middle Ages, e.g. reliquaries, processional or altar crosses (crux gemmata), or precious book covers such as those of the Codex Aureus of St. Emmeram and Codex Aureus of Echternach.

The smaller four plaques, or 'picture-plates' (Bildplatten), bear pictorial representations of figures and scenes from the Bible and inscriptions in cloisonné enamel in Byzantine "sunk" (Senkschmelz) style. Each of these enamelled plates is surrounded by blue sapphires and pearls in raised filigree settings.

- The Front Right Plate shows Christ in Majesty between two cherubim beneath the inscription in red enamel "By me kings reign" (P[er] ME REGES REGNANT; Proverbs 8:15).
- The Back Right Plate shows the Prophet Isaiah standing and speaking to King Hezekiah, who is shown sitting on his bed. Isaiah holds a scroll with the words, "Behold, I will add fifteen years to your life" (II Kings 20:6). Above both Isaiah and Hezekiah are their names in red enamel (ISAIAS P[ro]PHETA · EZECHIAS REX).
- The Front Left Plate shows King Solomon holding a scroll with the words, "Fear the Lord and flee from evil" (Proverbs 3:7), with his name above in red enamel "King Solomon" (REX SALOMON).
- The Back Left Plate shows King David holding a scroll with the words, "The renowned king delights in doing justice" (Psalm 99:4), beneath the inscription naming him in red enamel (REX DAVID).
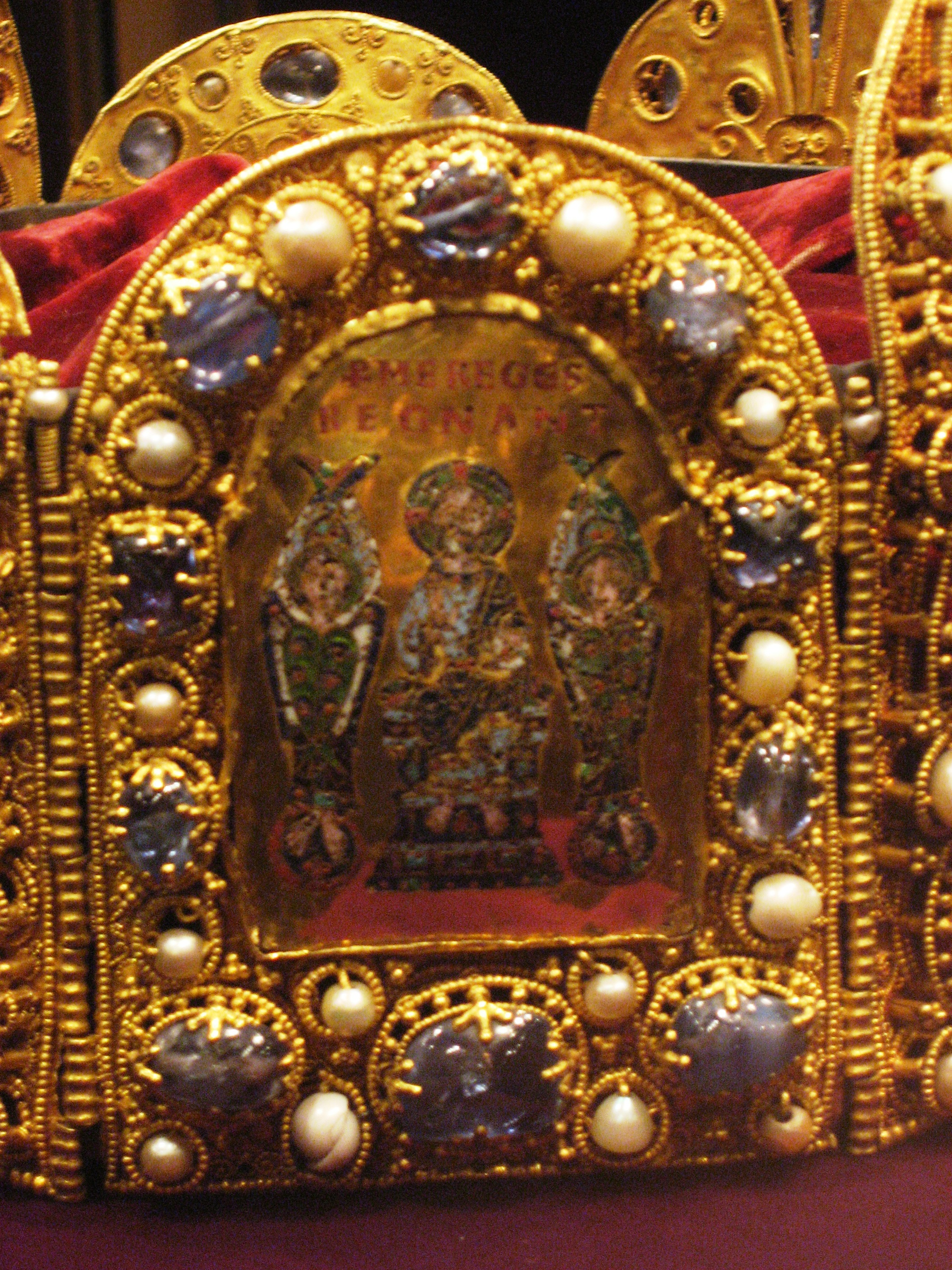
Christ in Majesty

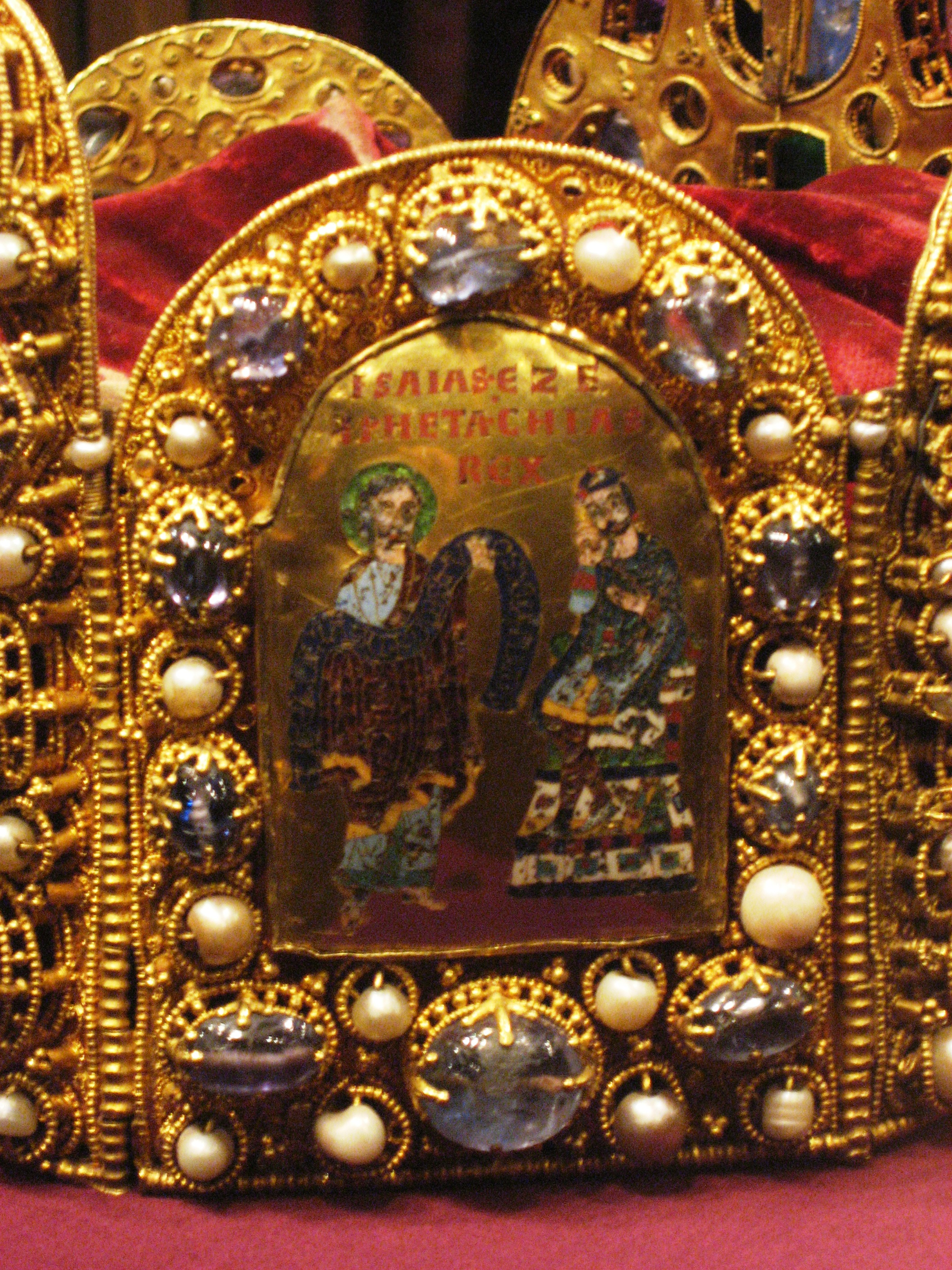
Prophet Isaiah and King Hezekiah

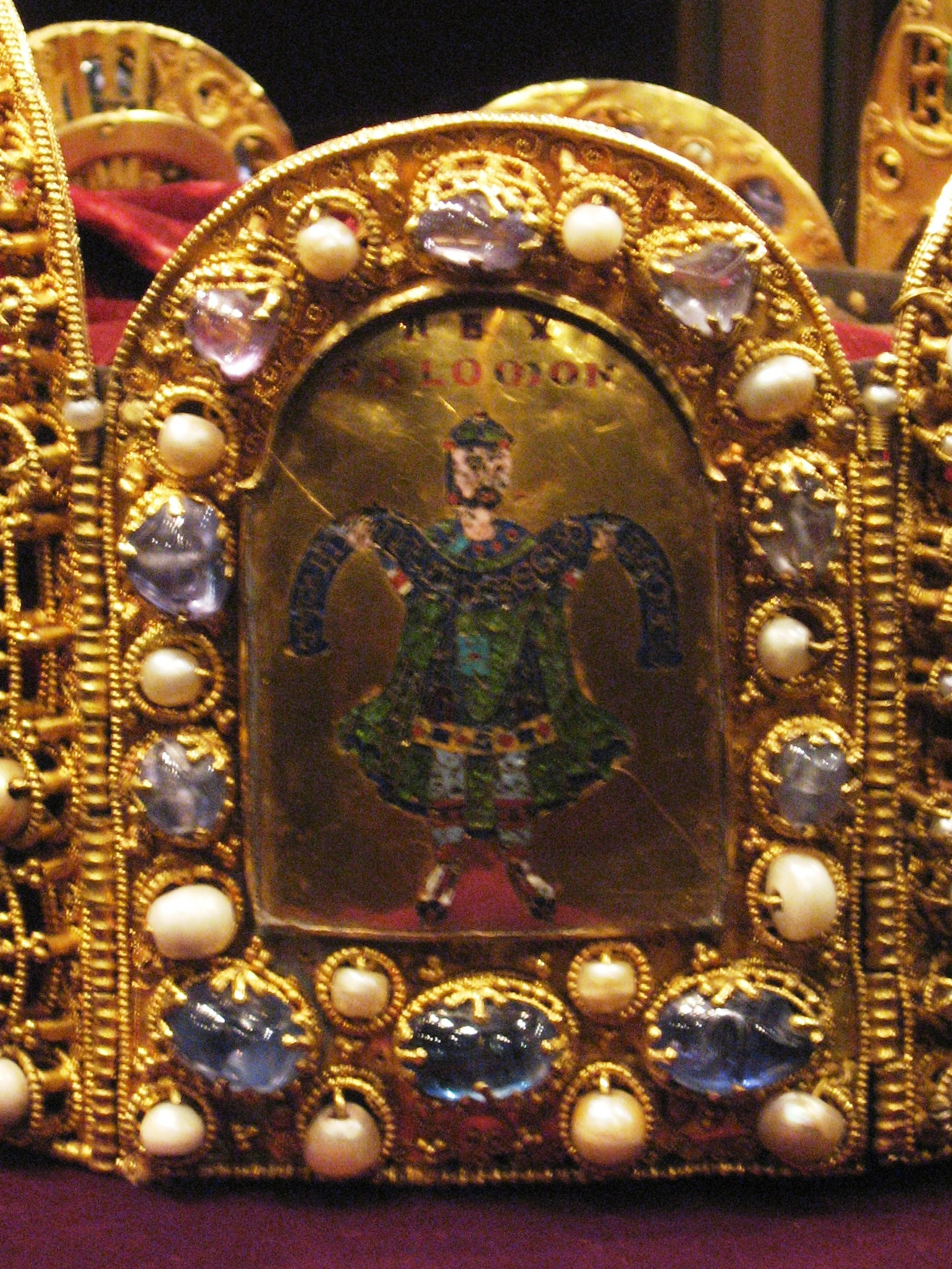
King Solomon

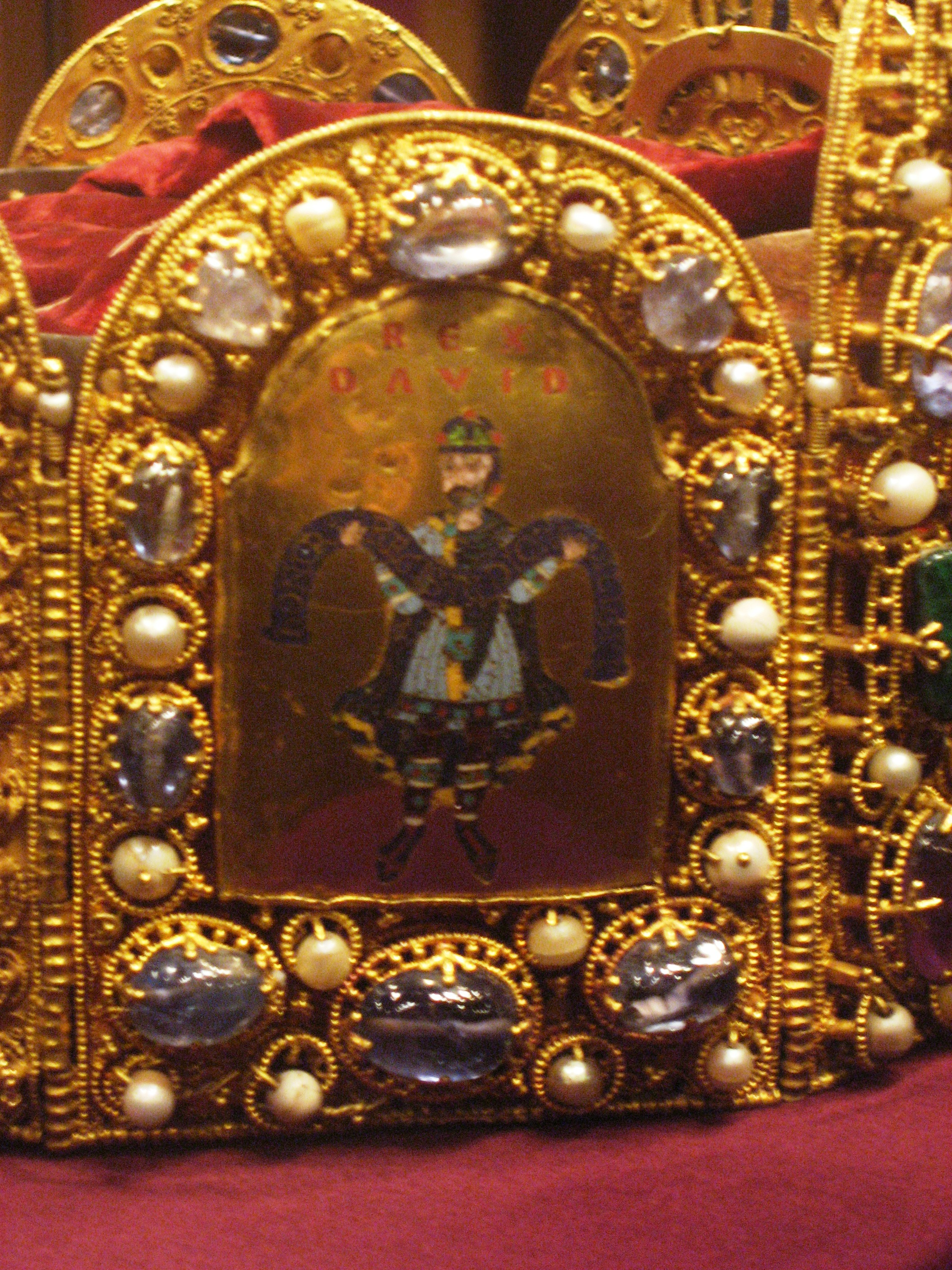
King David

The other four plates, or 'stone-plates' (Steinplatten), are of various sizes and decorated solely with precious stone and pearls in raised filigree settings. The twelve stones on the front and back plates are probably a direct reference to the twelve stones of the Jewish high priest's breastplate or hoshen (Exodus 39:9-14) and to the twelve foundation stones of the New Jerusalem in the Revelation to John (Revelation 21: 19-21).

The top central stone of the front plate is a triangular sapphire which replaces a famous stone, now lost, which was known as the Waise (i.e., the 'Orphan', because of its uniqueness), probably a large white opal with a wine-red fire or possibly a singularly brilliant garnet or red zircon and the subject of medieval lore. In the 13th century, the natural philosopher Albertus Magnus wrote that:

Orphanus is the stone in the crown of the Roman Emperor, and has never been seen anywhere else, and therefore it is called the orphan. Its colour is like wine, of a delicate wine-red, as if gleaming or shining white snow were mingled with clear red wine, and were overcome by it. It is a brilliant stone, and tradition says that at one time it used to shine by night; but nowadays it does not shine in the dark. It is said to preserve the royal honour.

When and why it was removed from the Imperial Crown is not known. The last mention of it is in an inventory ordered by Charles IV in 1350.

The crown has a single arch (or hoop) from the front to the back plate with the name and imperial style which may have belonged to Conrad II ("the first German monarch to call himself 'king of the Romans' (Rex Romanorum)"), in seed pearls. On the left side of this arch these seed pearls spell out the words "Conrad, by the Grace of God" (CHVONRADUS DEI GRATIA), while on the right side they read "Emperor of the Romans, Augustus" (ROMANORU[M] IMPERATOR AUG[USTUS]). Above the front plate and in front of the arch is a jeweled cross with an engraving of the crucified Christ on its reverse side, originally a pectoral cross said to have belonged to Henry II and only later attached to the Imperial Crown. It is probable that both the arch and cross were added during Conrad II's reign.

There are three small holes on each of the two side stone-plates from which probably hung chains with pendant jewels, known as pendilia. These were a feature of the now-lost crown of Byzantine emperors, as in the mosaic portrait of Justinian I in the Basilica of San Vitale in Ravenna. Pendilia are still extant on the Holy Crown of Hungary, or the Crown of Constance of Aragon held in Palermo Cathedral.

The present red velvet cap on the inside of the crown dates from the 17th century. Before this the imperial crown was worn over a mitre; assuming this had the form of the Byzantine camelaucum, the arch would have caused it to bulge up on both sides, much as the embroidered ribbon from front to back on the eleventh century bishops' mitres caused their linen fabric to bulge up. Thus the Imperial Crown appears to be the earliest form of mitre crowns worn by the Holy Roman Emperors as a sign of their imperial office, the form of which was perpetuated in the crown created for Rudolf II and now known as the Imperial Crown of Austria.

== Commemoration ==
An identical copy was made in 1915 by order of Wilhelm II for display in Aachen, where it is still kept in the Krönungssaal of Aachen Town Hall, built in the 14th century on the remains of Charlemagne's palace.

There are also copies of the crown and regalia in the Historical Museum of Frankfurt; in the fortress of Trifels in the former Electorate of the Palatinate; and in the Czech castle of Karlštejn, along with a copy of the Crown of Saint Wenceslas.

The Imperial Crown of the Holy Roman Empire was selected as the main motif for one of Austria's "100 EUR" commemorative gold coins for the year 2008. The obverse shows the Imperial Crown of the Holy Roman Empire; the reverse shows Emperor Otto I in front of Old St. Peter's Basilica in Rome, where his coronation took place.

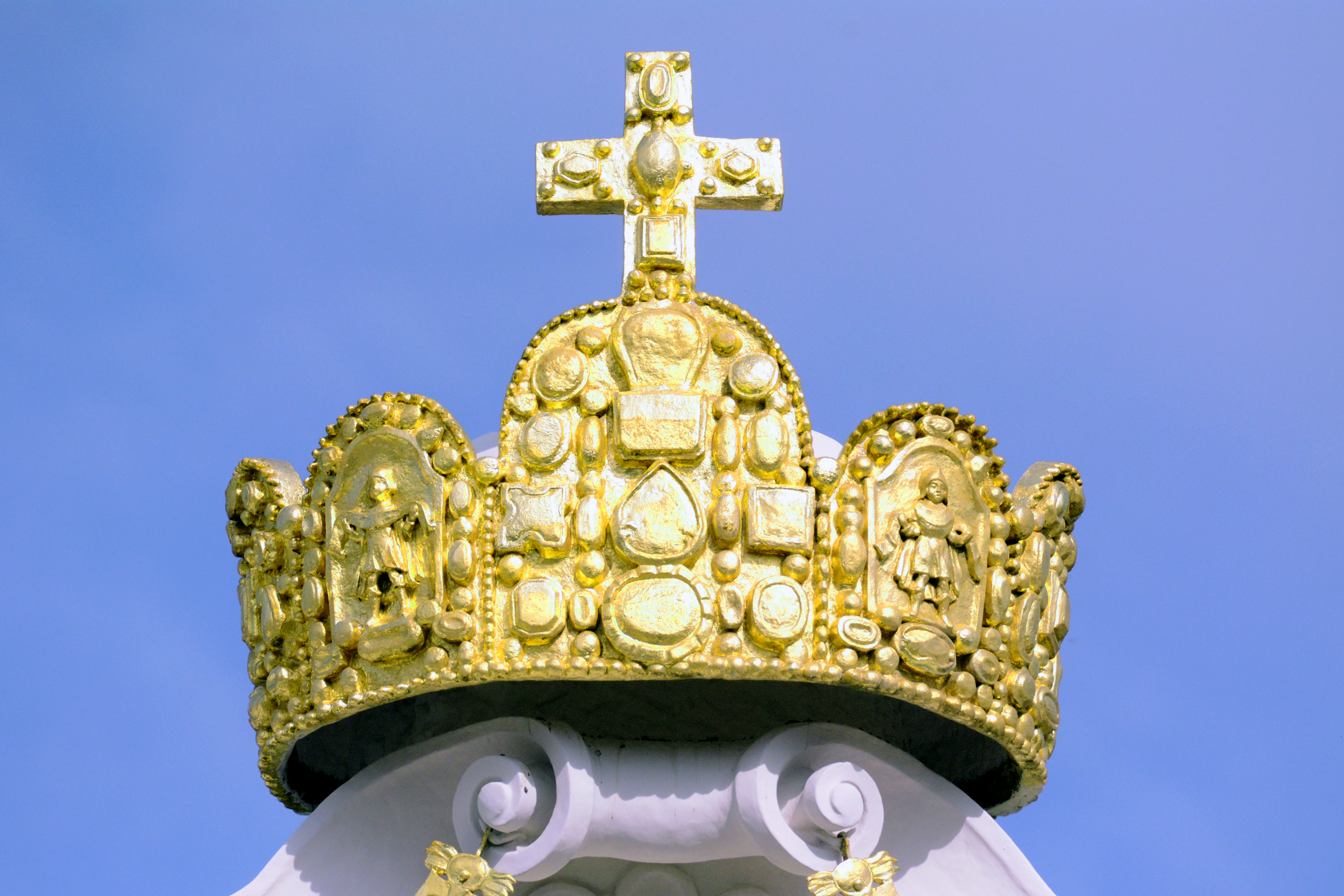
The crown on the Imperial Chancellery Wing (Reichskanzleitrakt) of the Hofburg in Vienna

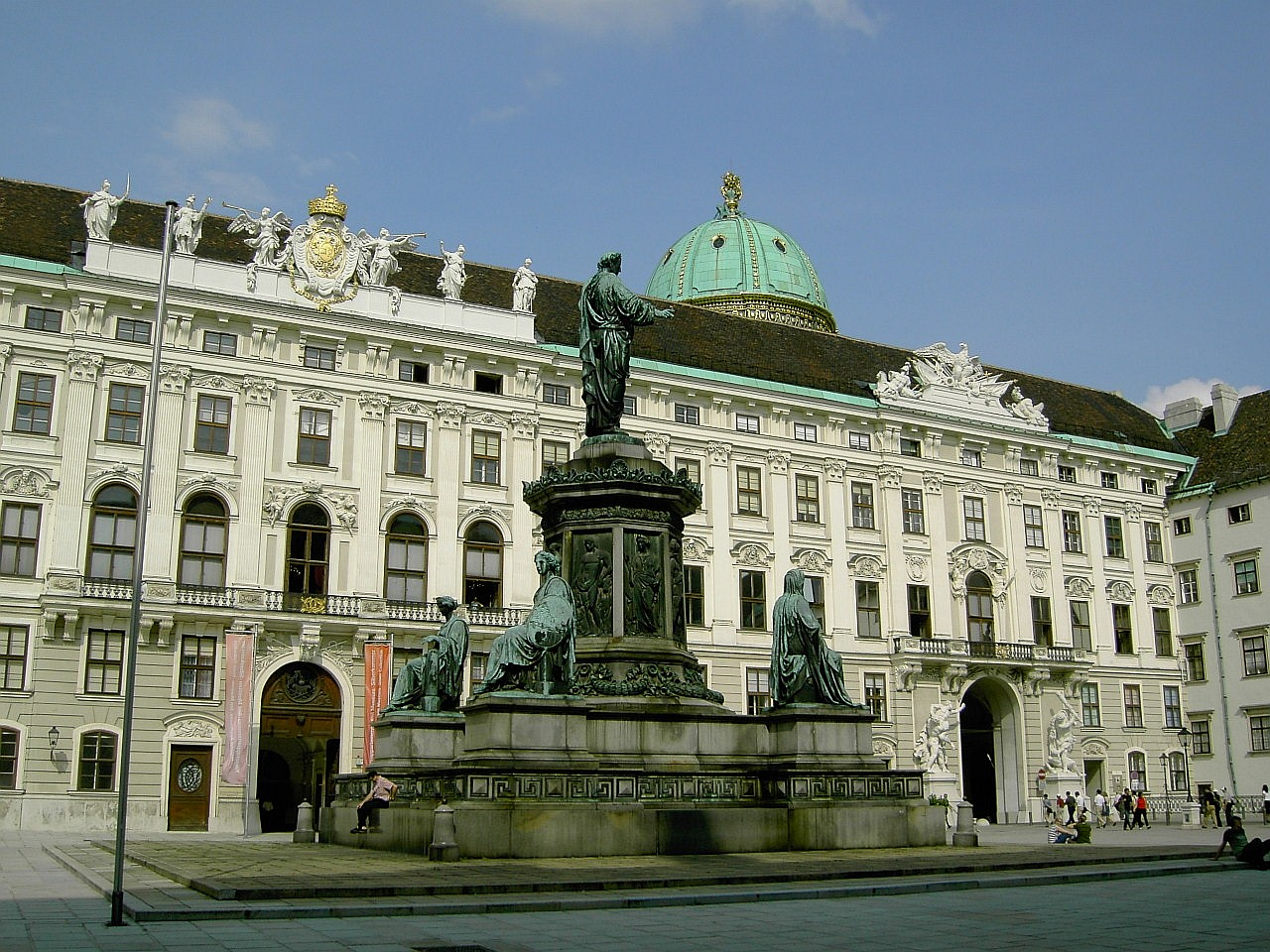
The Reichskanzleitrakt with the monument to Francis II in the foreground

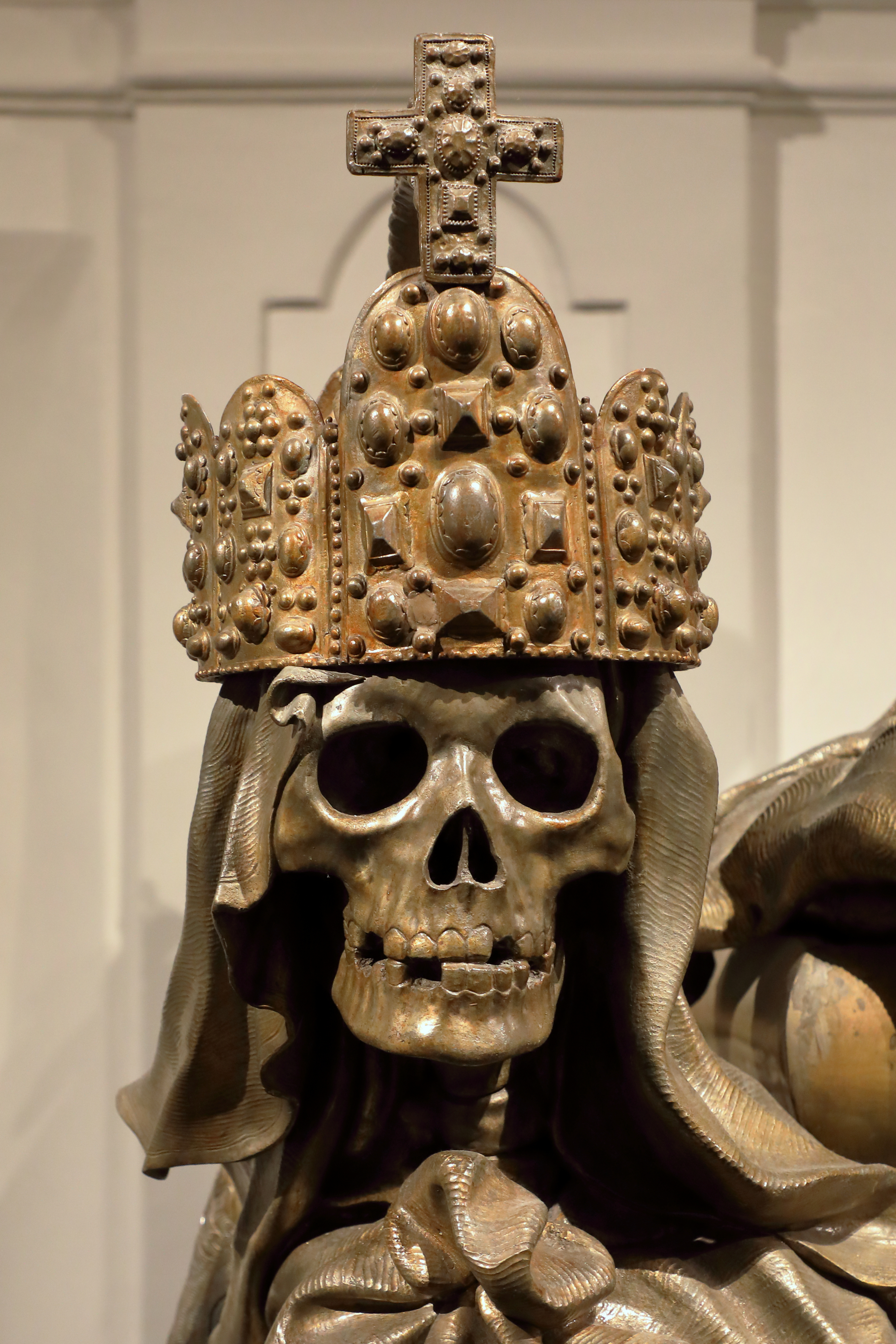
Detail of the sarcophagus of Charles VI in the Imperial Crypt in Vienna

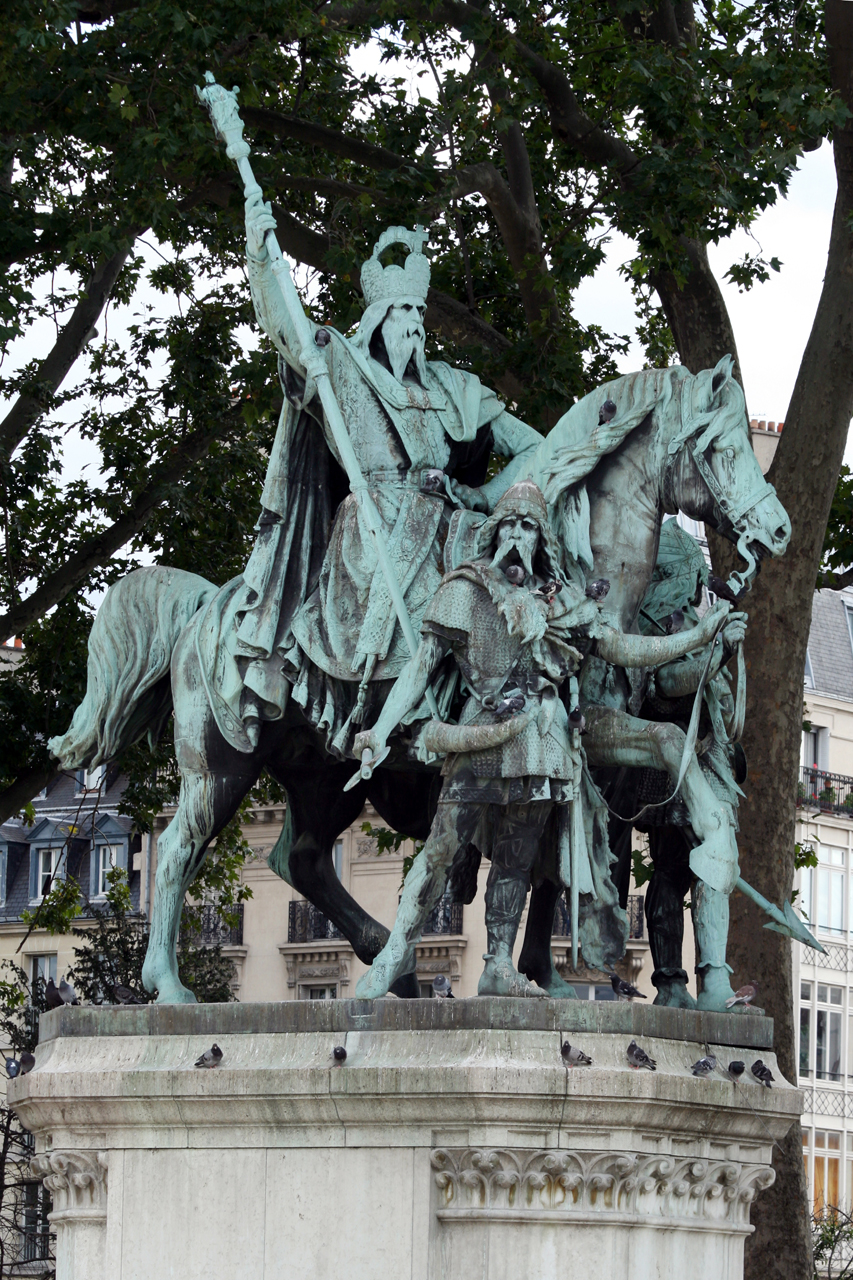
Equestrian statue of Charlemagne in Paris (1878), showing him wearing the Imperial Crown

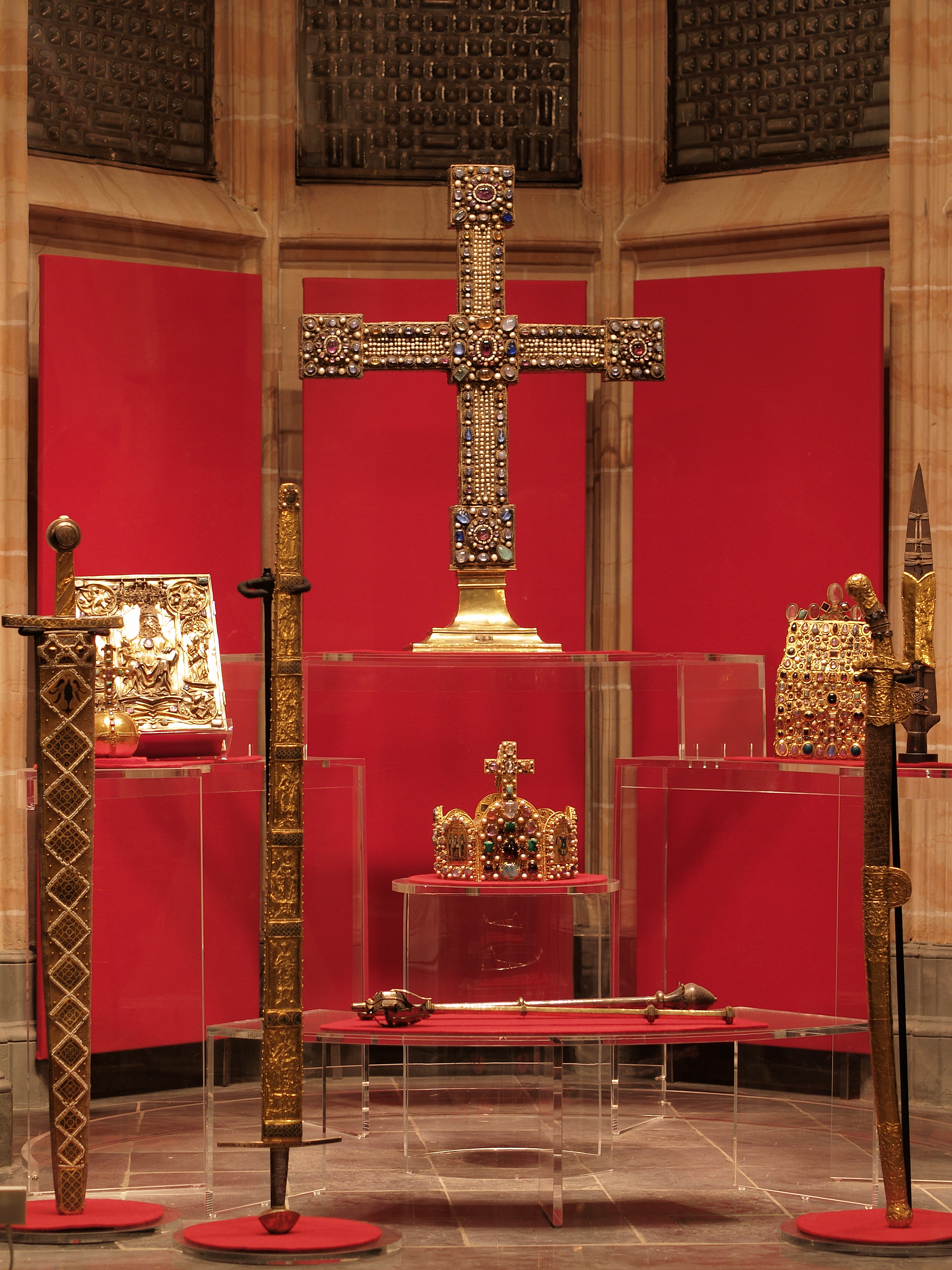
Replica made in 1915 (with other Imperial Regalia) in Aachen Town Hall

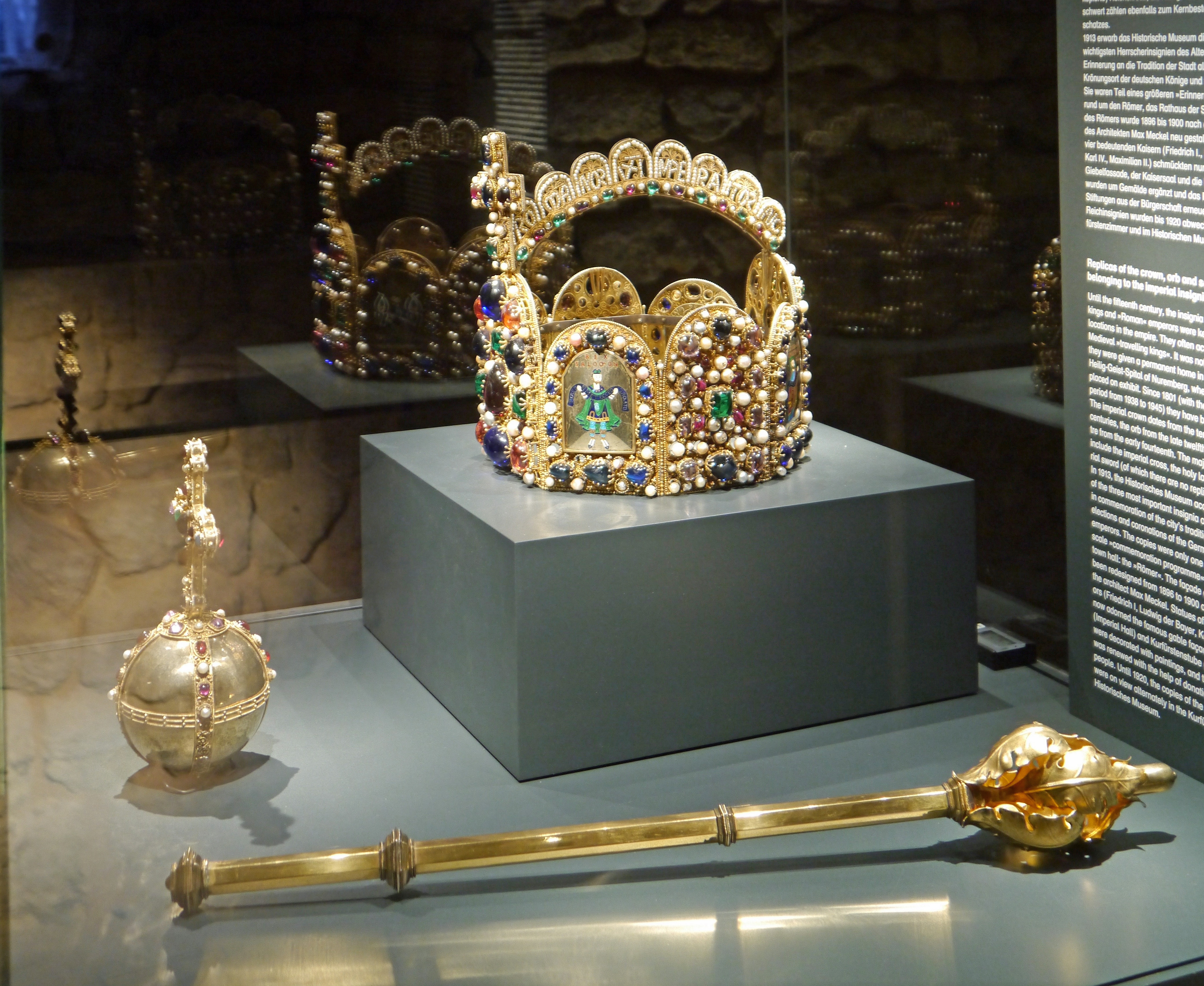
Replica made in 1913 for the Römer, now at the Historical Museum, Frankfurt

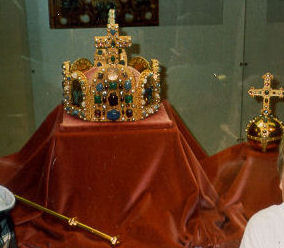
Replica displayed in Trifels Castle

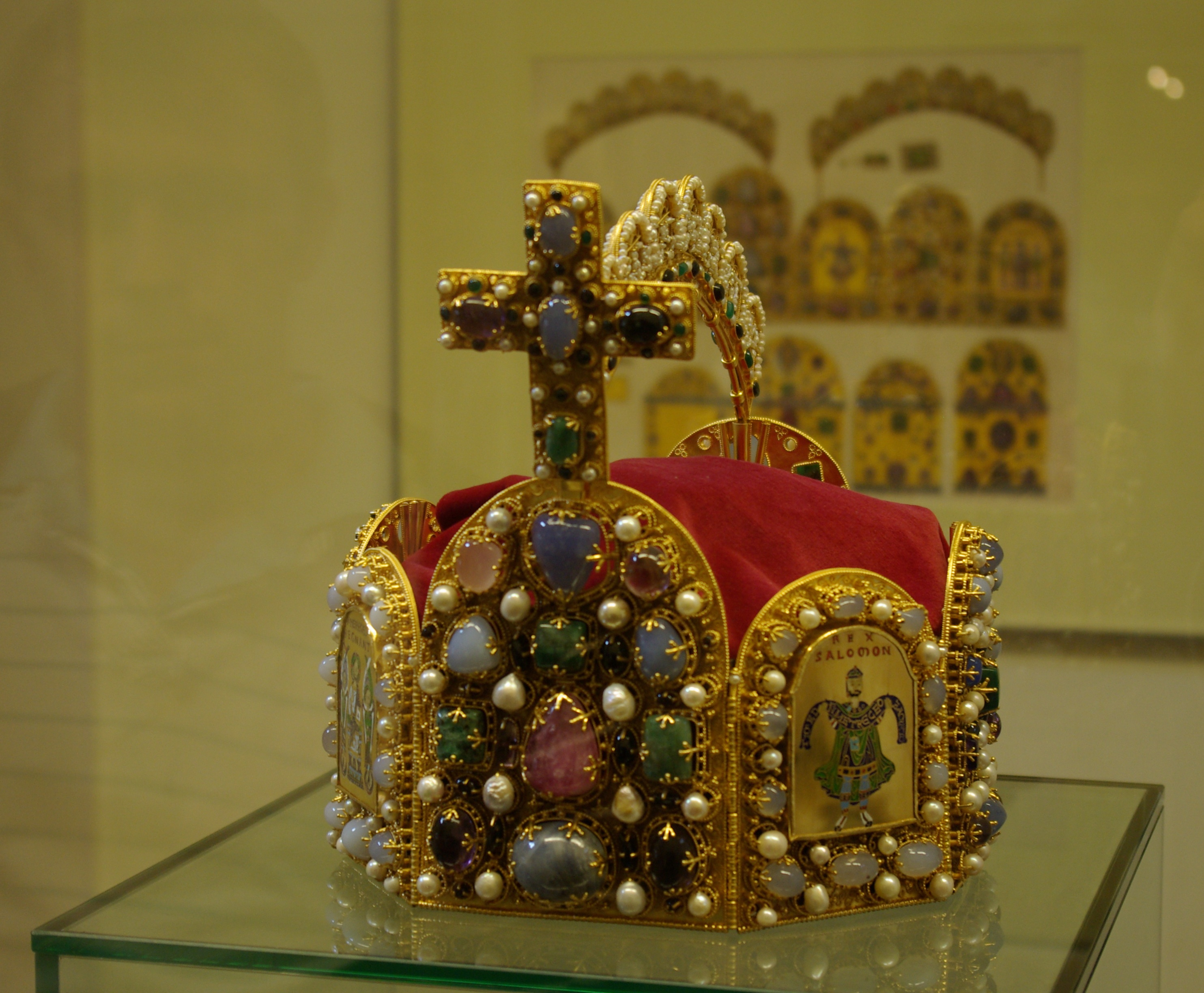
Replica in Nuremberg

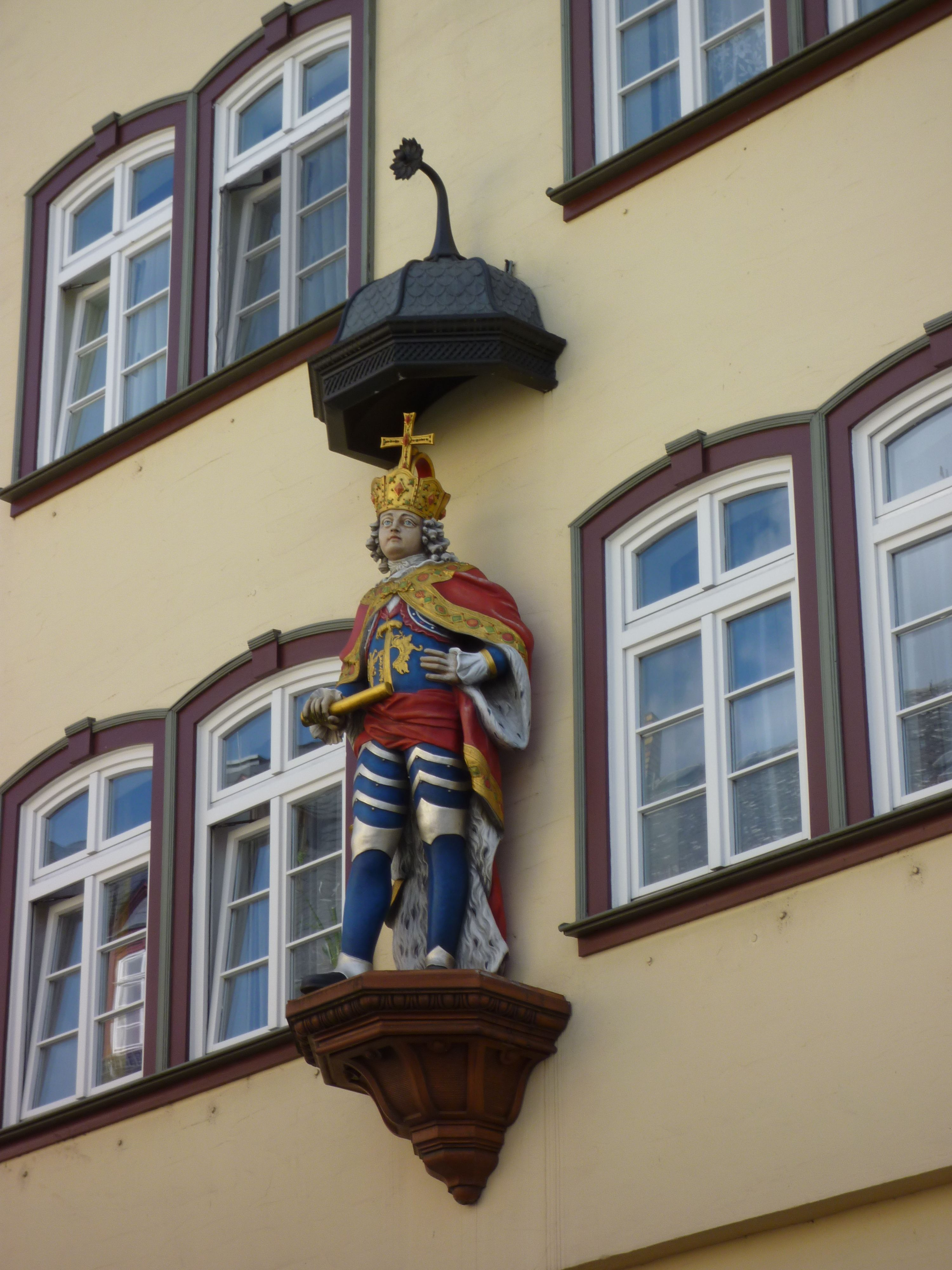
Statue decorating the house "zum römischen Kaiser" (1767) on the Kornmarkt in Wetzlar

Imperial Crown of the Holy Roman Empire commemorative coin

== See also ==
- Imperial crown
- Crown of Charlemagne
- Imperial Crown of Austria
- Imperial Crowns of Charles VII
- Crown of Napoleon
- Crown of Wilhelm II
