= Jan Vermeyen =

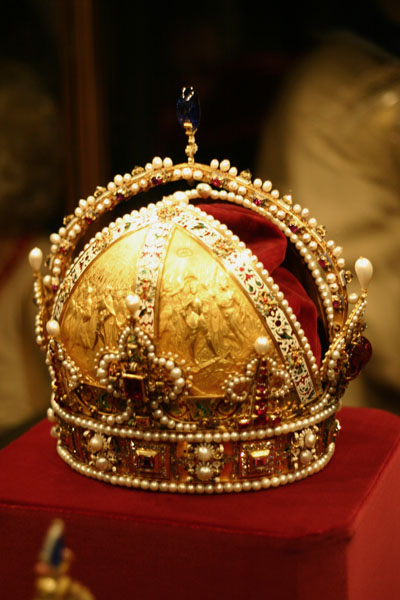
The Imperial Crown of Rudolph II designed and executed by Jan Vermeyen

Jan Vermeyen (before 1559 – 1606) was a goldsmith of the Renaissance Mannerism.

Jan Vermeyen was born in Brussels, the son of a Flemish painter Jan Cornelisz Vermeyen in Brussels. He was educated in goldsmithery and started his career between 1580 - 1590 in Antwerp, where he married, too. In 1592 he was inscribed as a member of the goldsmith' guild in Frankfurt on the Main. From 1600 he lived and worked in Prague, Lesser Town, district of St. Thomas church. He was one of the favorite court artists of Emperor Rudolph II. According to inventories he made more than 10 existing masterworks. They are usually dishes from exotic organic materials as bezoar or rhinoceros horn, or from colorful precious stones (cut by the Prague workshop of Ottavio Miseroni) set with cameos (by Alessandro Masnago), all mounted in gold, for Emperor's Kunstkammer of the Prague Castle. Today some of them are exhibited in Kunsthistorisches Museum in Vienna. His most famous work is the golden private crown of the emperor, which came later into use as Imperial Crown of Austria, is shown in the Treasury of the Hofburg Castle. He died in Prague.

== Literature ==
- Rudolf DISTELBERGER, Die Kunstkammerstücke, in: Prag um 1600, Kunst und Kultur am Hofe Rudolfs II.. Katalog der Ausstellung in Essen und Wien, Freren 1988, pp. 449 - 452.
- Dana STEHLÍKOVÁ: Encyklopedie českého zlatnictví, stříbrnictví a klenotnictví (Encyclopaedia of the Czech goldsmithwork, silwersmithwork and jewellery). Prague Libri 2003, p. 526; ISBN 80-85983-90-7.
