= Imperial Crown of Austria =

Crown worn by Habsburg emperors

Coordinates: 48°12′24″N 16°21′56″E

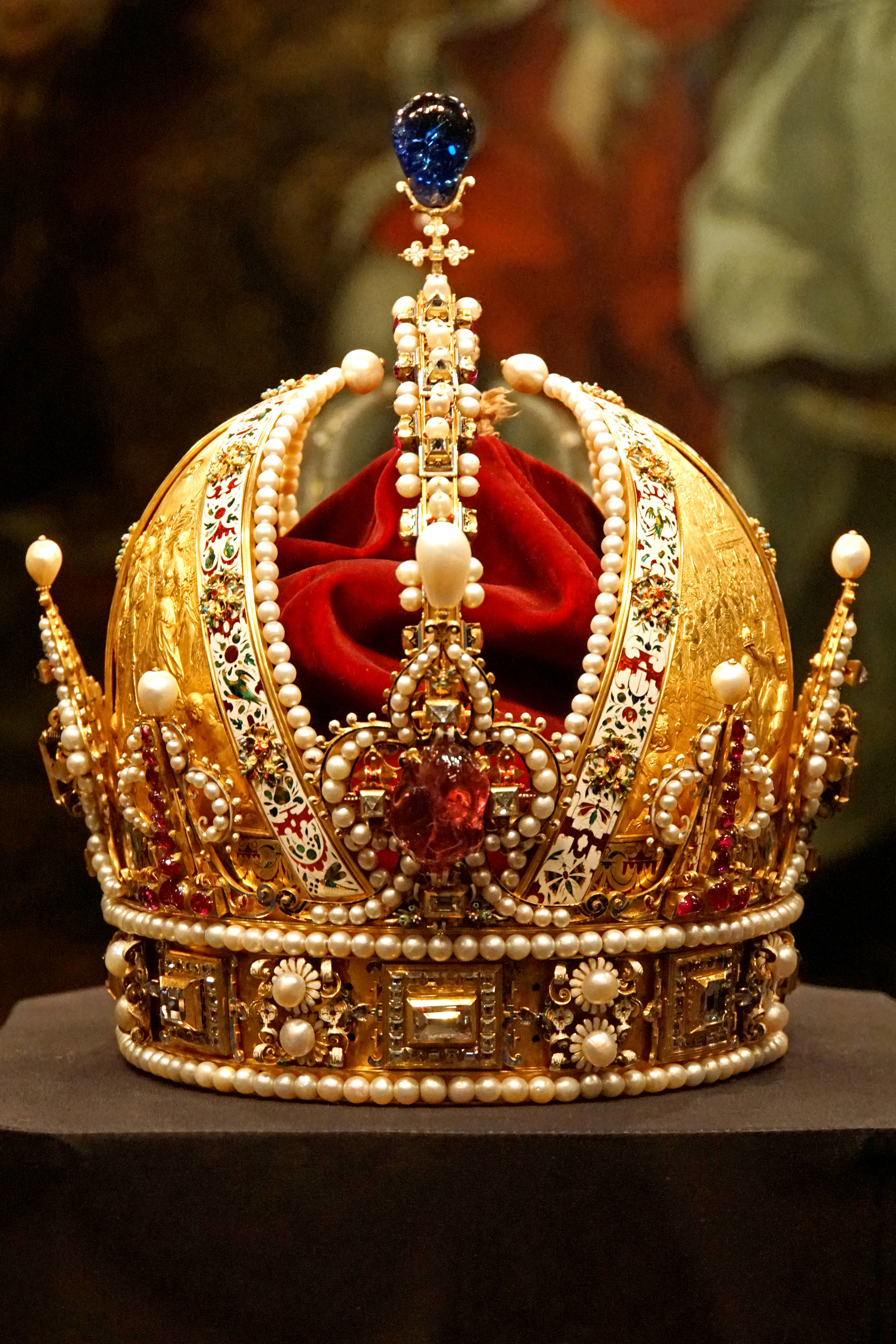

Heraldic depictions

Details
- Country: Austrian Empire; Austria-Hungary
- Made: 1602
- Owner: Imperial Treasury
- Arches: 1
- Material: Gold
- Cap: Red velvet
- Notable stones: Diamonds, spinels, sapphires, pearls
- Predecessors: Reichskrone

The Imperial Crown of Austria (German: Österreichische Kaiserkrone) is a crown formerly in use by the monarchs of the Habsburg monarchy. The crown was originally made in 1602 in Prague by Jan Vermeyen as the personal crown of Holy Roman Emperor Rudolf II, and therefore is also known as the Crown of Emperor Rudolf II (German: Rudolfskrone). The crown was used as a private crown of the Holy Roman Emperors and Kings of Hungary and Bohemia from the House of Habsburg. In 1804 it became the official crown of the newly constituted Austrian Empire. After 1867 it remained the imperial crown of the Cisleithanian part of the Austro-Hungarian Empire until 1918.

== Description ==
The Imperial Crown consists of three principal elements possessing great symbolic significance: the circlet, the high arch, and the mitre.

=== Circlet ===
The circlet is dominated by eight large squares of diamonds, forming a crown in itself, which symbolises royal authority. Between the stones are two large pearls arranged vertically and set within white enamel rosettes surrounded by scrollwork. From the circlet emerge eight lilies, which were probably inspired by the Bohemian Crown of St. Wenceslas. The lilies are also associated with the fleurs-de-lis of the House of Valois. The use of eight elements was also taken from the Imperial Crown of the Holy Roman Empire, which includes a circlet made out of eight plates. In the circlet are precious stones such as spinels, zircons, and pearls. The zircons are cut in such a way that they are flat at the front. Preparing precious stones for mounting in this way was a relatively new technique at the time the crown was made. The pearls were added by Alexander Emmanuel Köchert of the A. E. Köchert shop in Vienna.

=== Mitre ===
The mitre symbolises the divine right to rule, and the spiritual position of the emperor, who during coronation was consecrated symbolically as a deacon. The mitre fills the left and right sides of the crown, leaving an opening in the middle through which the high arch passes. The mitre is made of gold, with a band of enamel work depicting birds and plants. The mitre is divided into four sections representing the high honours of Holy Roman Emperor Rudolf II. The first section shows him kneeling, receiving the Imperial Crown of the Holy Roman Empire in Regensburg as Holy Roman Emperor. The second section shows him riding onto the coronation hill in Pressburg (Bratislava) during his coronation as King of Hungary. The third section shows his coronation procession through Prague as King of Bohemia. The fourth section depicts an allegory of his victory over the invading Turks. The Latin inscription inside the arch reads, RVDOLPHVS II ROM[ANORVM] IMP[ERATOR] AVGVSTUS HVNG[ARIAE] ET BOH[EMIAE] REX CONSTRVXIT MDCII (Rudolf II, Emperor of the Romans, Augustus, King of Hungary and Bohemia, Constructed in 1602).

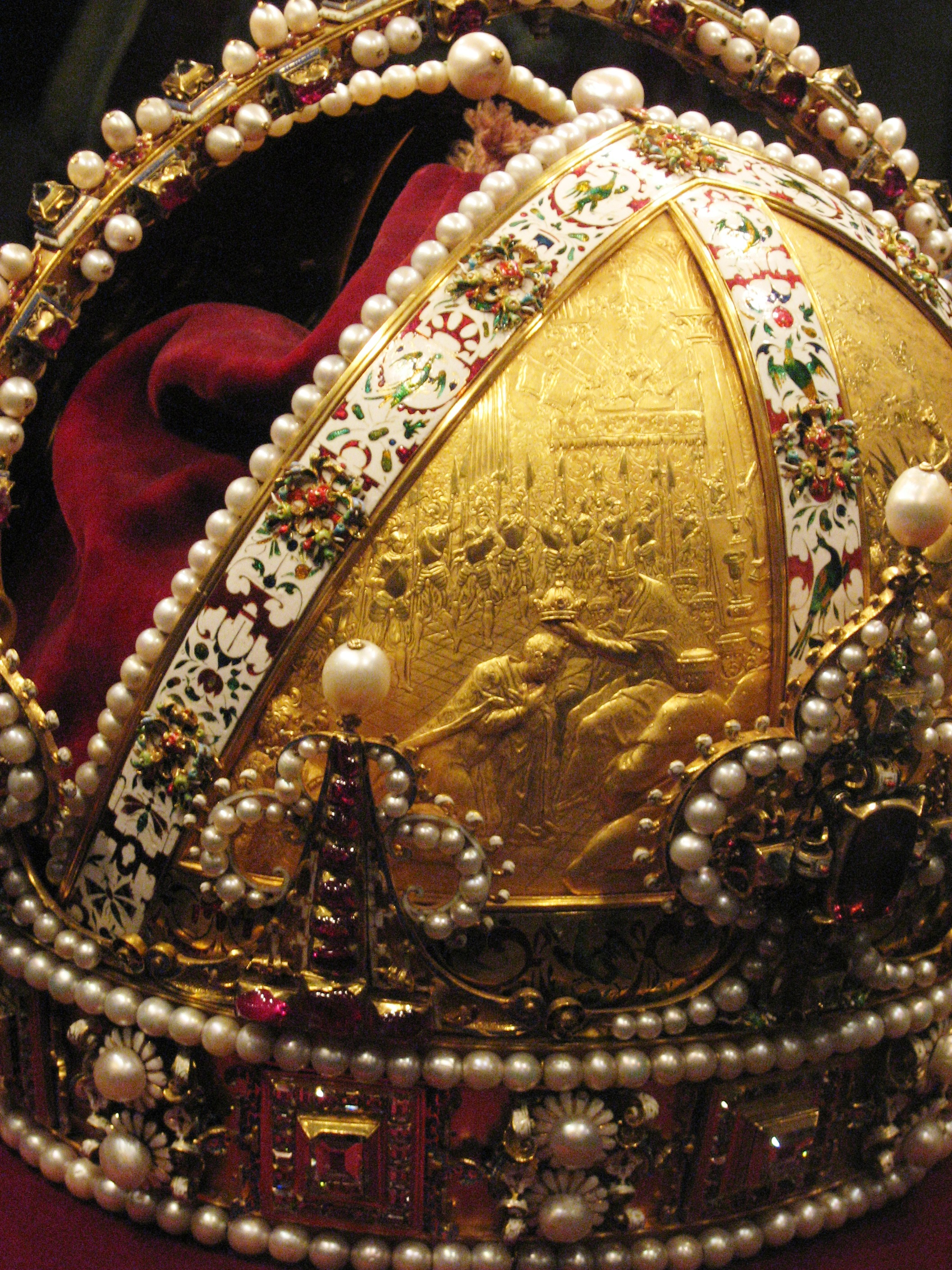
Coronation as Holy Roman Emperor in Regensburg

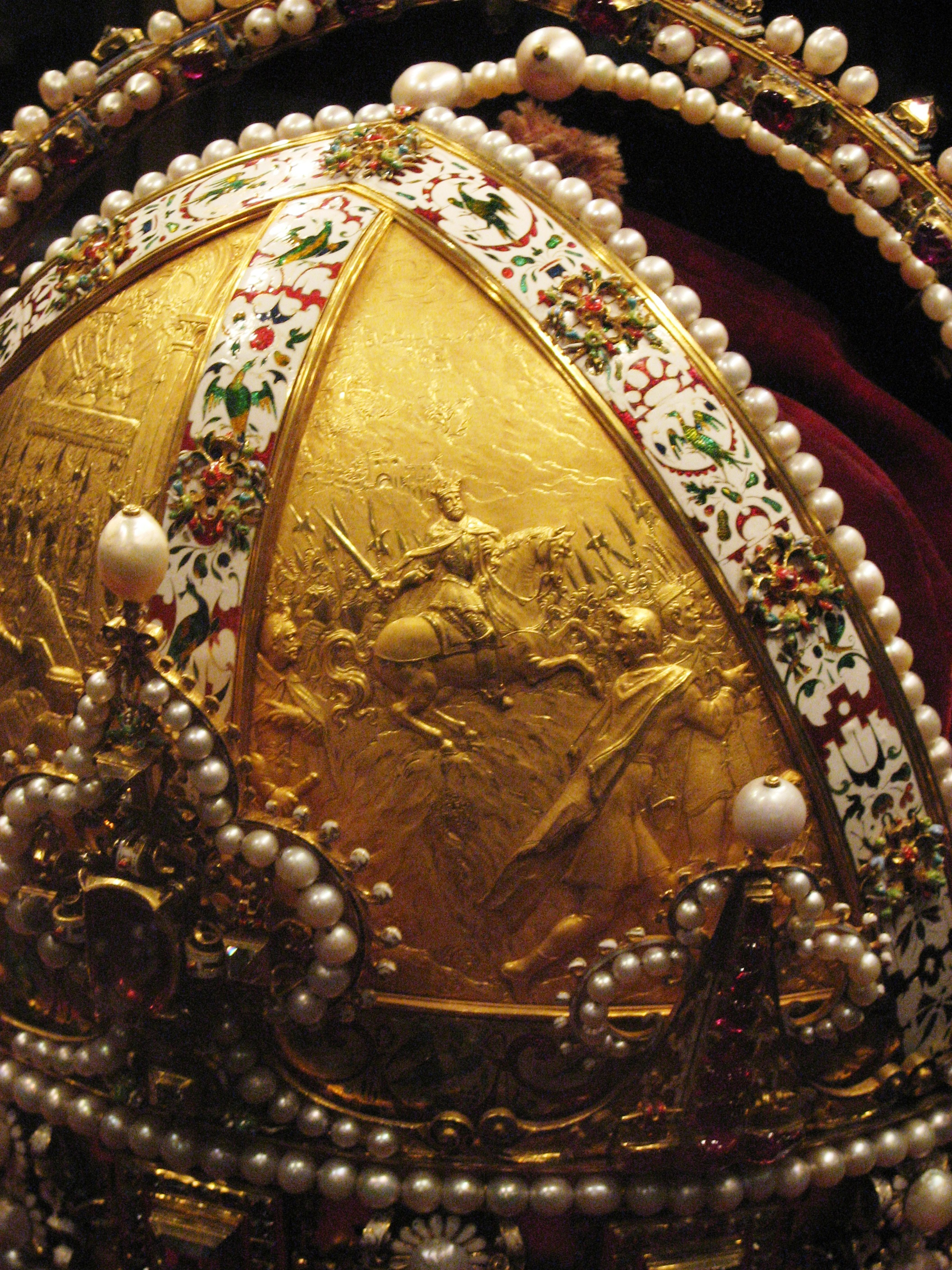
Ride onto the coronation hill in Pressburg (Bratislava)

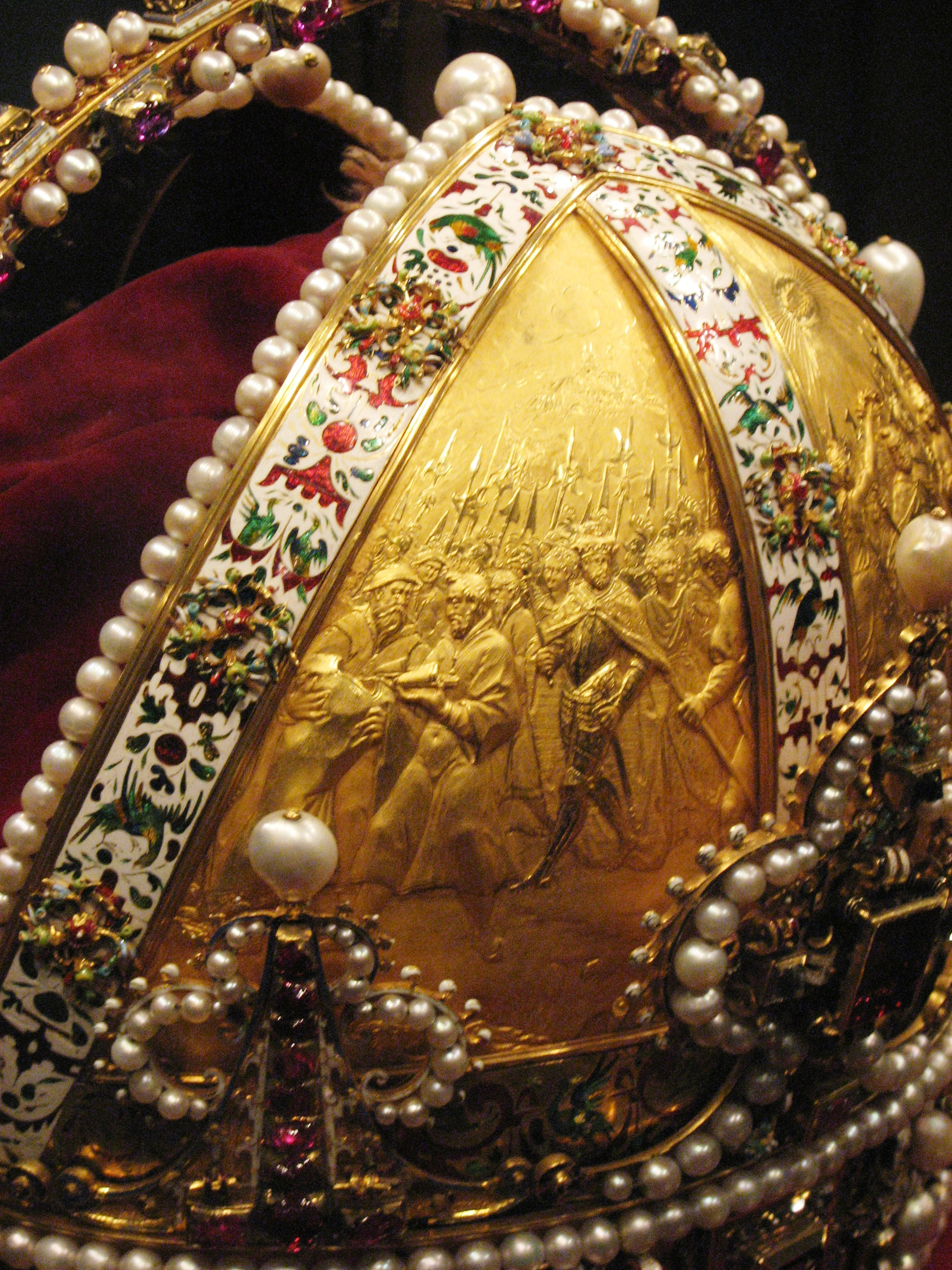
Coronation procession through Prague

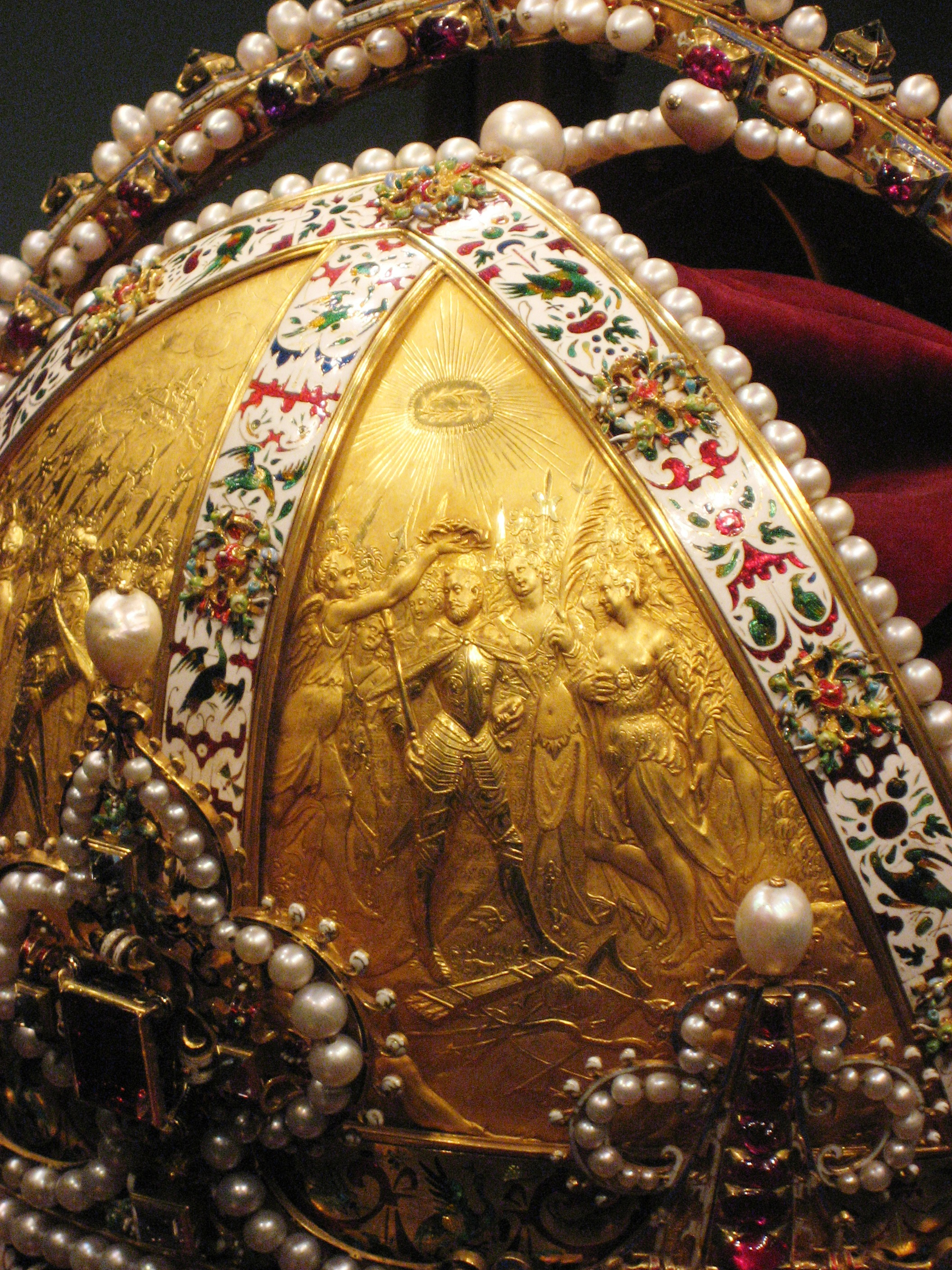
Allegory of victory over the Ottoman Empire

=== High arch ===
The high arch was inspired by the arch of the Imperial Crown of the Holy Roman Empire. It rises from the front and back of the circlet and is studded with eight diamonds, which symbolise Christ. The emperor was regarded as governor on earth in the name of Christ. At the top of the arch is a blue sapphire, which symbolises heaven, above a very inconspicuous cross. The sapphire was not cut, but polished.

== History ==
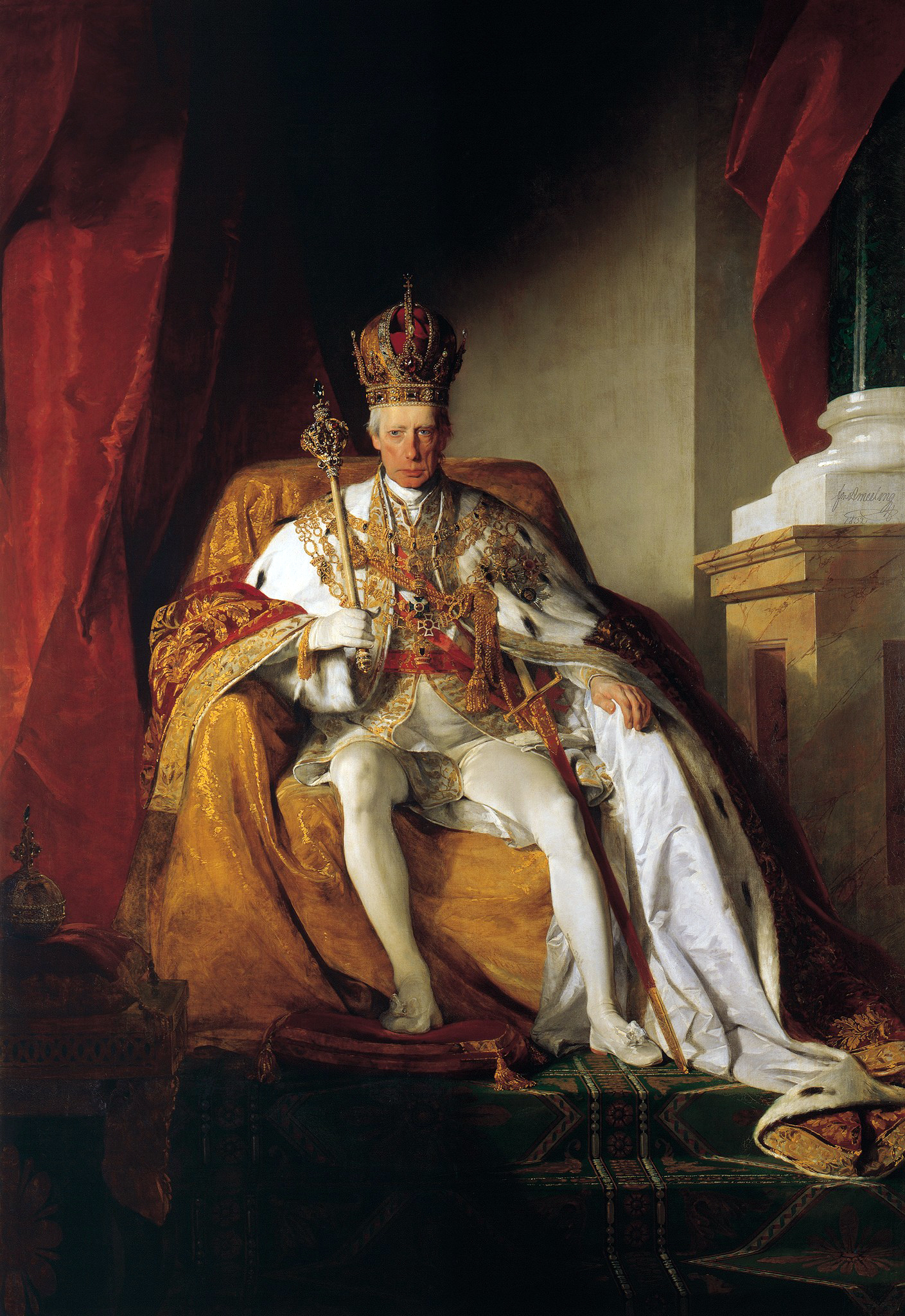
Portrait of Emperor Francis I of Austria by Friedrich von Amerling (1832), showing the Imperial Crown of Austria, Sceptre, and Regalia

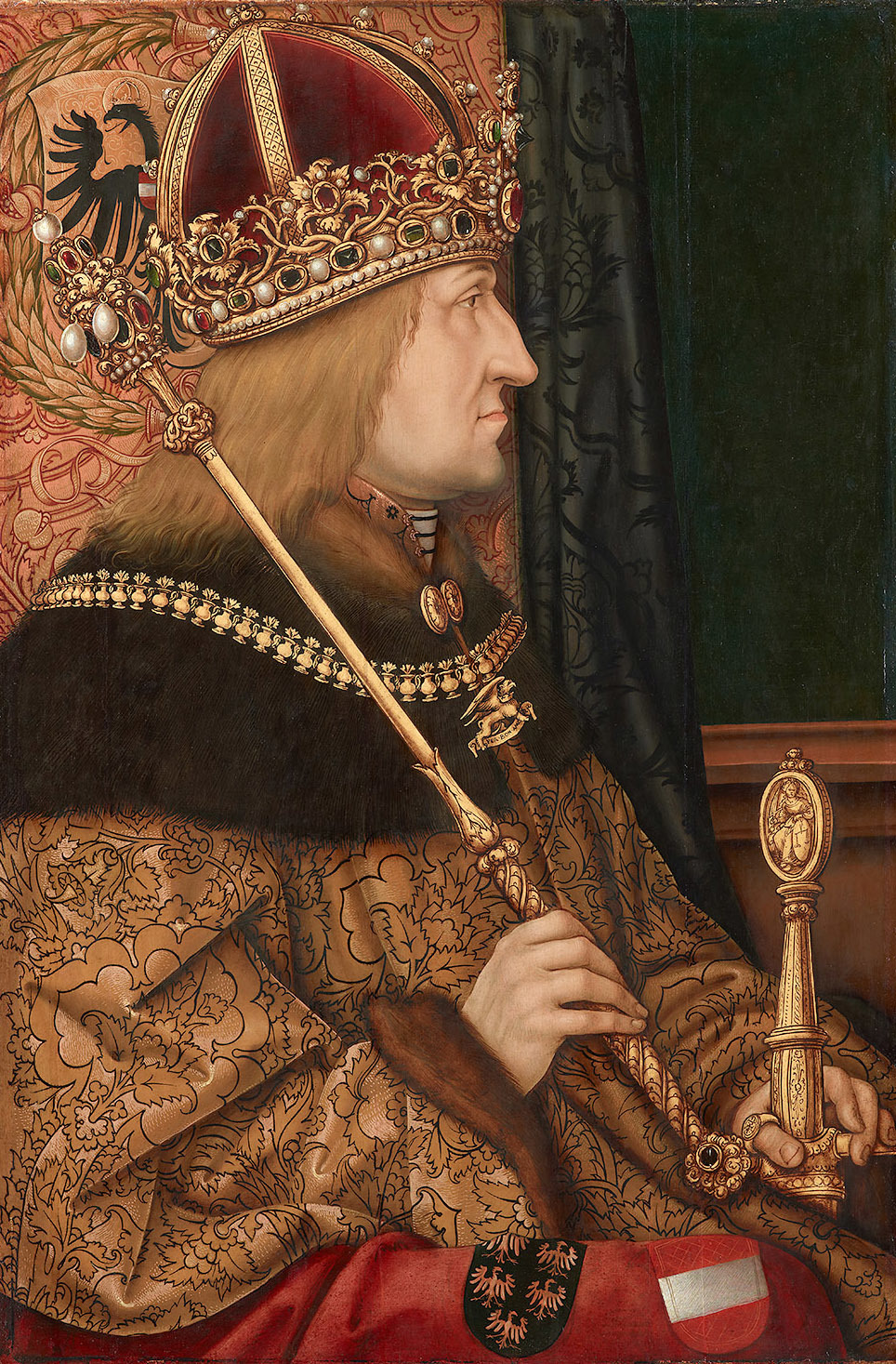
Emperor Frederick III by Hans Burgkmair, showing a predecessor of the Imperial Crown

Since the Imperial Regalia of the Holy Roman Empire, including the Crown, were kept in Nuremberg and could only leave the city for a coronation, some rulers had their own personal crowns made. For example, when they attended a session of the Imperial Diet (Reichstag), they attended with their own crowns. The oldest depiction of such a private crown is an etching by the artist Albrecht Dürer of Emperor Maximilian I, where a depiction of a crown is seen that might have later influenced the appearance of the crown of Rudolf II.

The Imperial Crown of the Habsburg Empire of Austria was never used for a coronation, since, unlike the Holy Roman Empire, it was a hereditary monarchy and such an act of legitimization was not seen as necessary. The ceremony held was an act of investiture to mark the monarch's official ascension to the throne rather than a coronation.

The crown of Rudolf II was made in 1602 in Prague by Jan Vermeyen, one of the most outstanding goldsmiths of his time, who was called specially from Antwerp. The crown is made out of three parts: the circlet (Kronreif), the high arch (Kronbügel), and a mitre (Mitra).

In the earlier forms of the Western mitre the peaks or 'horns' were over the ears, rather than over the face and back of the head. The form of mitre used in the imperial mitral crown preserved this earlier form. This form of the imperial mitre-crown can be seen in the extant portraits of such emperors as Frederick III and Maximilian I The bronze effigy of Maximilian I found on his monumental cenotaph in the court church in Innsbruck has a crown with two arches which cross over the top of the mitre and the unique form of the imperial crown adopted by Maximilian as Emperor of Mexico appears to have been modeled on this form, but with the half-arches and the eagles on the circlet on the front, back and sides. In the later 17th century Baroque form of mitral crown of Leopold I the peaks of the mitre have been rounded into the hemispherical form Peter the Great would adopt as the Imperial Crown of Russia when he took the title emperor as Russian sovereign.

Although it is often assumed that the Imperial Crown made for Otto I with its single arch over its inner red cap was the original prototype for the western imperial crown, it is also possible that the Byzantine imperial crown, which in the twelfth century also became closed with two arches, inspired the western emperors to follow their example and also close their crowns with such a pair of arches.

== Imperial Orb and Sceptre ==
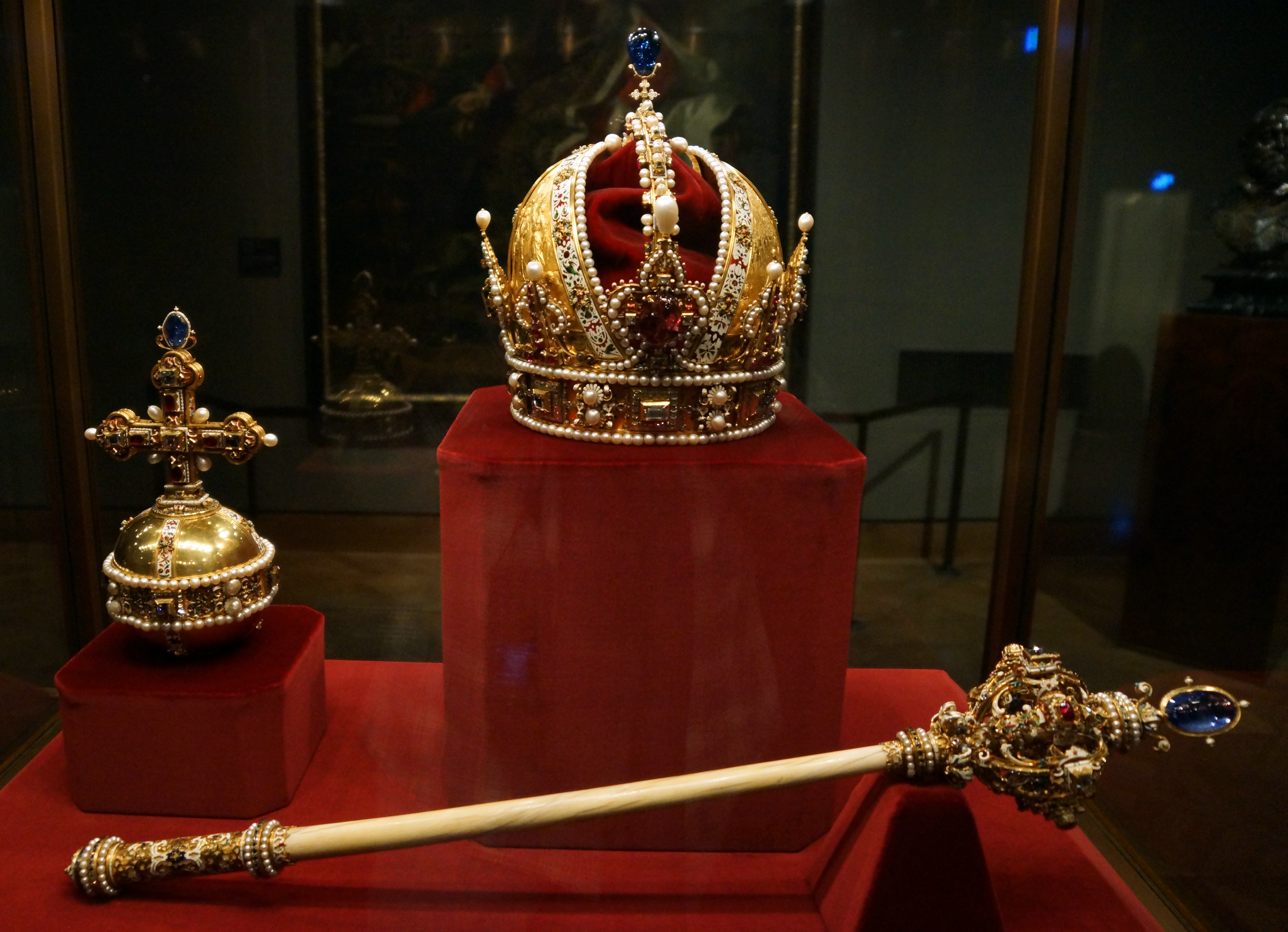
Imperial Crown, Orb, and Sceptre of Austria, displayed in the Imperial Treasury at the Hofburg Palace in Vienna

The Imperial Crown is associated with the Imperial Orb and Sceptre, and they are displayed together in the Imperial Treasury at the Hofburg Palace in Vienna, Austria. The Imperial Orb was commissioned in 1612 by Rudolf's brother and successor, Holy Roman Emperor Matthias, and was created by Andreas Ochsenbruck. The shape takes its inspiration from the crown, especially the enamel-work which is in the same style. It is topped by a large sapphire. A peculiarity of the Sceptre is that it was said to be made from unicorn horn, but in fact it was made from the horn of a narwhal. The Imperial Orb and Sceptre were already in use before the proclamation of the Austrian Empire, as Bohemian royal regalia and for the hereditary private estates (Erbhuldigung) of the Archduchy of Austria.

== Other uses ==
Coats of arms of Amsterdam with the imperial Austrian crown

- A number of beer companies feature the Imperial Crown on their logo, such as the Royal Brewery of Krušovice (cs: Královský Pivovar Krušovice) in the Czech Republic.
- Some cities have their coat of arms crowned by the Imperial Crown. Amsterdam, was granted its coat of arms to be crowned by emperor Maximilian I in 1489 in recognition of its financial support for one of his wars. The crown can be seen on the spire of Westerkerk and adorning the Blauwbrug.
