= Book of Gifts and Rarities =

The Book of Gifts and Rarities is an Arabic history of wealth and ostentation from the 6th to 11th centuries. It was written in Egypt by an official of the Fatimid Caliphate sometime after 1071. The extant version of the work is incomplete and lacks clear attribution. Although it has been attributed to Al-Qāḍī al-Rashīd Aḥmad ibn al-Zubayr, this ascription is not universally accepted.

== Authorship ==
The Book of Gifts and Rarities is strictly anonymous as it stands and its authorship debated.

=== Ibn al-Zubayr ===
The text's first editor, Muḥammad Ḥamīdallāh, identified the author as al-Qāḍī al-Rashīd Abū l-Ḥusayn Aḥmad ibn al-Qāḍī al-Rashīd ibn al-Zubayr. This name is known only from some citations by al-Ghūzūli, although Ḥamīdallāh argued that he was identical to the Muhadhdhab ibn al-Zubayr whose poetry is cited in al-Maqrīzī's Khiṭaṭ. No al-Qāḍī al-Rashīd ibn al-Zubayr is mentioned in any of the biographical dictionaries that cover the 11th century.

In her doctoral dissertation, Ghāda al-Ḥijjāwī al-Qaddūmī tentatively identified Ḥamīdallāh's Ibn al-Zubayr, on the basis of his name and title, as the elder brother of the great-great-grandfather of the judge Aḥmad ibn al-Zubayr, who died in 1166 or 1167. The latter is mentioned in the biographical dictionary of Ibn Khallikān. He belonged to a family of judges (qāḍīs) with the hereditary honorific (laqab) al-Qāḍī al-Rashīd. The other parts of his Arabic name are his kunya Abū l-Ḥusayn ('father of al-Ḥusayn') and his nasab, Ibn al-Zubayr, referring to the name of an ancestor. His given name was Aḥmad. He must have been the eldest son, since he gave his eldest son the same name as his father (al-Ḥusayn).

Shākir Muṣṭafā identifies al-Ghūzūli's Ibn al-Zubayr with the 12th-century judge and al-Maqrīzī's with his brother, a poet who died in 1166. Neither could be the author of an 11th-century text. In a more recent work, al-Qaddūmī rejects Ḥamīdallāh's hypothesis and treats the text as anonymous.

=== Dates ===
The author can be approximately dated by internal references in the text. In 1052 or 1053, he witnessed at Tinnīs the transshipment of gifts sent by the Byzantine emperor Constantine IX and bound for Cairo and the court of the Fatimid caliph al-Mustanṣir. At Tinnīs in 1070, he was told by Khaṭīr al-Mulk Muḥammad, son of the vizier al-Yāzurī, about a gift sent to al-Mustanṣir by King Iqbāl al-Dawla of Dénia. The latest event in which he mentions himself is a meeting in Damietta in 1071.

The author thus lived in Egypt between 1053 and 1071 and was probably a Fatimid official. Ḥamīdallāh thought he was an official already in 1052–1053, having previously the Buyid emir Abū Kālījār (1024–1048) in Iraq. Clifford Bosworth surmises he was probably a Shīʿī who fled to the Fatimids after the arrival of the Sunnī Seljuks in Iraq. Al-Qaddūmī originally thought that he was probably a young man, perhaps even a teenager, in 1052.

== Manuscript and title ==
The Book of Gifts and Rarities does not survive complete. It is known from one extensive manuscript now in the library of Afyonkarahisar in Turkey. This is not a complete text, but consists of excerpts gathered by Shihāb al-Dīn al-Awḥadī in the 15th century. The manuscript itself is an autograph by Ibn Duqmāq, who died in 1406. It may once have belonged to the Ottoman vizier Gedik Ahmed Pasha (1473–1482). The titlepage, added later, mistakes al-Awḥadī for the author. Both al-Maqrīzī in his Khiṭaṭ and Ittiʿāẓ al-Hunafā and al-Ghūzūli's Maṭāliʿ quote excerpts not included in al-Awḥadī's compendium.

The title is a matter of confusion. At the end of the sole surviving copy, al-Awḥadī calls the book he compiled from Kitāb al-Hadāyā waʾl-tuḥaf, 'Book of Gifts and Rarities'. The title on the titlepage, added by a librarian, is Kitāb al-Dhakhāʾir waʾl-tuḥaf, 'Book of Treasures and Rarities'. It is not original, but is taken from al-Maqrīzī. In her dissertation, al-Qaddūmī accepts the full title as given by al-Ghūzūli (Kitāb al-ʿAjāʾib waʾl-ṭuraf waʾl-hadāyā waʾl-tuḥaf, 'Book of Wonders, Curiosities, Gifts and Rarities'), which the latter usually abbreviates to al-ʿAjāʾib waʾl-ṭuraf.

The first edition of the Book of Gifts and Rarities was published as the first volume in Kuwait's "Arab Heritage" series in 1999 under the title Kitāb adh-dhakhāʾir waʾt-tuḥaf. An English translation was published in 1996 under the title Book of Gifts and Rarities.

== Content ==
The Book of Gifts and Rarities is a history of wealth that covers gift exchanges between rulers, lavish and costly celebrations, inheritances and treasure troves. It was divided into twelve chapters, subdivided into 414 paragraphs. The version of al-Awḥadī, however, twice combines two chapters into a single chapter (chapters 5 and 10), making a total of ten chapters. Their titles are:

1. Gifts
2. Expenditures on the Famous Wedding Banquest and Memorable Parties
3. Famous Circumcision Feasts and the Well-known Celebrations for Proficiency in Reciting the Qurʾān
4. Notable Days, Gatherings on Annual Holidays and Crowded Festivities
5. Unusual Existing Objects and Safeguarded Treasures
6. Inherited Bequests
7. Things Left Behind After the Death of the Caliph's Mother and After Those Related to Them
8. Booty After Conquests and Shares After Raids
9. Mention of Treasures, Treasure Troves, Ancient Hidden Treasures and of Those Who Found Them
10. Expenditures

The Book covers mainly the Abbasid, Buyid and Fatimid dynasties. The earlier Rightly-Guided Caliphs and the Umayyads receive less coverage, and that mostly related to war booty. The whole work projects a gradual increase in luxury among Muslim rulers. The Fatimids have been lumped into the final chapter by al-Awḥadī. The earliest episode recounted in the surviving version of the text is the gifts sent to the rulers of China, India and Tibet by the Sasanian king Khosrow I (531–579). The latest episode is dated 1071. Geographically, its scope stretches from al-Andalus in the west to Sind in the east.

The author was an eyewitness to some of what he records, but most was taken from written sources. He cites 21 different written authorities as well as some eyewitnesses and, in a few cases, hearsay.

The Book is the most important source for two famous pearls of great size, al-Yatīma (Orphan) and al-ʿAẓīma (Enormous).

== Bibliography ==
- Bosworth, C. E. (1965). "An Embassy to Maḥmūd of Ghazna Recorded in Qāḍī Ibn az-Zubayr's Kitāb adhdhakhā'ir wa't-tuḥaf". Journal of the American Oriental Society. 85 (3): 404–407. doi:10.2307/597823. JSTOR 597823.
- Christys, Ann (2010). "The Queen of the Franks Offers Gifts to the Caliph al-Muktafiʾ". In Wendy Davies; Paul Fouracre (eds.). The Languages of Gifts in the Early Middle Ages. Cambridge University Press. pp. 149–170.
- Halm, Heinz (2005). "Das 'Buch der Schätze und Raritäten': Zur Autorschaft und Überlieferung des Kitāb aḏ-ḏaḫāʾir wa t-tuḥaf". In U. Vermeulen; J. van Steenbergen (eds.). Egypt and Syria in the Fatimid, Ayyubid and Mamluk Eras. Vol. 4. Peeters. pp. 79–84.
- Ḥamīdallāh, Muḥammad (1953). "Embassy of Queen Bertha of Rome to Caliph al-Muktafi Billah in Baghdad 293H./906". Journal of the Pakistan Historical Society. 1: 272–300.
- Ḥamīdallāh, Muḥammad, ed. (1959). Kitāb adh-dhakhāʾir waʾt-tuḥaf. Kuwait.
- Qaddūmī, Ghāda al-Ḥijjāwī al- (1996). Book of Gifts and Rarities (Kitāb al-Hadāyā wa al-Tuḥaf): Selections Compiled in the Fifteenth Century from an Eleventh-Century Manuscript on Gifts and Treasures. Harvard University Press.
- Qaddumi, Ghada Hijjawi (1990). A Medieval Islamic Book of Gifts and Treasures: Translation, Annotation and Commentary on the Kitab al-Hadaya wa al-Tuhaf (PhD dissertation). Harvard University.
- Shalem, Avinoam (1997). "Jewels and Journeys: The Case of the Medieval Gemstone Called al-Yatima". Muqarnas. 14: 42–56. doi:10.2307/1523235. JSTOR 1523235.
