= Al-Yatima =

Pearl from the Islamic Middle Ages

Al-Yatīma (Arabic: اليتيمة, meaning 'the orphan', apparently named for its unique size) was a pearl "considered to be the most celebrated Islamic jewel of the Middle Ages". How it came into Muslim hands is not clear: it might have come from Visigothic Spain or the Sasanian Empire during the Islamic Conquests. During the Umayyad period al-Yatīma was displayed in the Dome of the Rock in Jerusalem; it (or another jewel believed to be it) came into Abbasid hands and became part of their royal insignia, mounted on the crown of al-Mu'tasim (r. 833-42 CE). From the tenth century onwards, its history is uncertain. The 11th-century Book of Gifts and Rarities records that the Yatīma was discovered by divers in the reign of Harun al-Rashid and that the Umayyads' pearl was called al-ʿAẓīma ('enormous one'). It was supposedly given by al-Mahdi to a slave girl named Hasana, who had it cut up to make dice.

It has been suggested that the German idea of der Weise ('the orphan'), a precious stone in the crown of the Holy Roman Emperor, was inspired by Arabic traditions of al-Yatīma.
