= Der Weise =

Gemstone in HRE crown

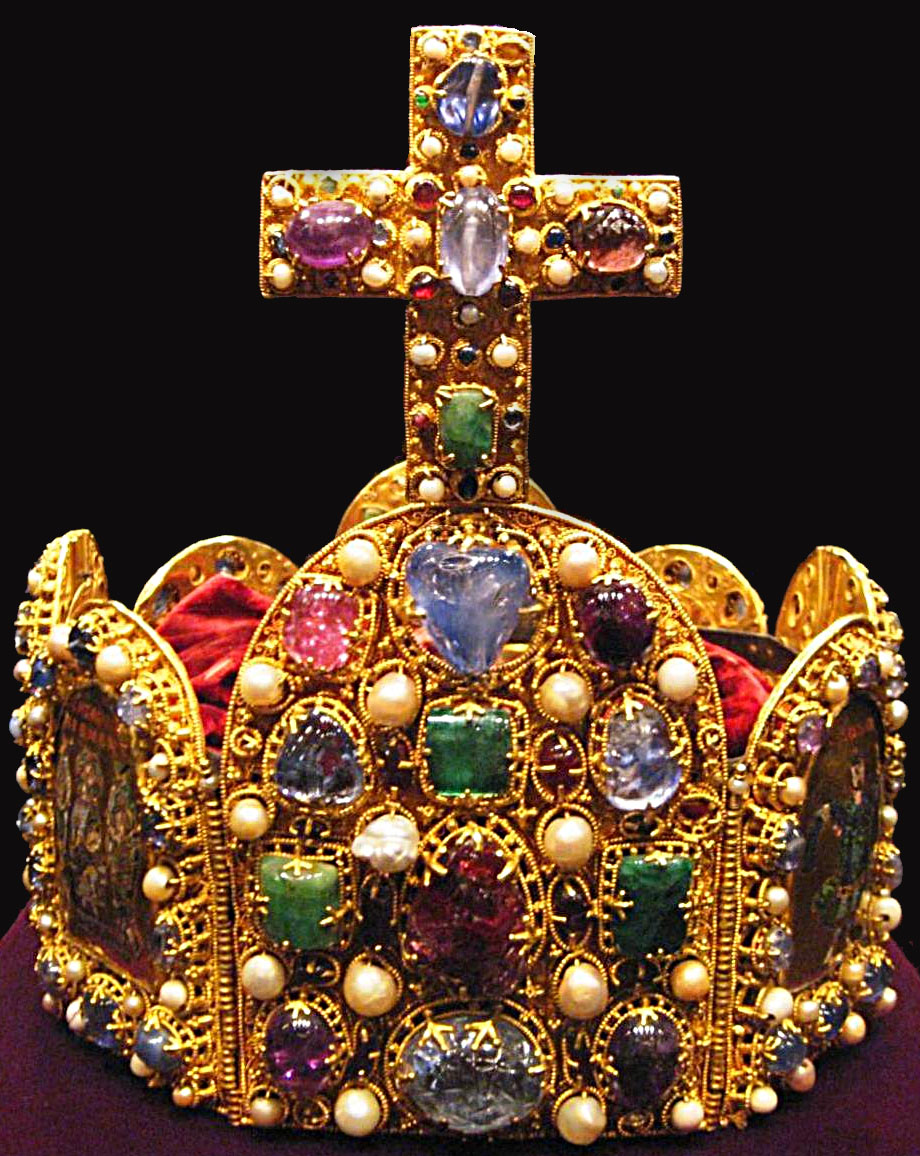
Front view of the Reichskrone, on which der Weise supposedly once sat, in the place now occupied by the top central stone of the front plate, a triangular sapphire.

Der Weise (Middle High German; German: die Waise; Latin: orphanus; literally 'the orphan', but often rendered as 'the Orphan Stone' or 'Orphan Jewel'; sometimes also Latin: pupilla) was an exceptionally large precious stone, perhaps an opal, set into the crown of the Holy Roman Emperor until being lost sometime in the fourteenth century.

The term der Weise was accordingly used in Middle High German, including in the political verse of Walther von der Vogelweide, as a metonym for the office of Holy Roman Emperor. Der Weise is first mentioned in the late thirteenth-century German poem Herzog Ernst, which associates the jewel with a crown that some scholarship links to the 962 coronation of Otto I, linked in turn in some scholarship with the Reichskrone (Vienna, Kunsthistorisches Museum, Schatzkammer der Hofburg, SK XII). Herzog Ernst says that der Weise was situated on the crown's front plate, in the middle of the upper row of four rows of three stones. It has been suggested that the German idea of der Weise was inspired by Arabic traditions of a similar peerless stone, al-Yatīma.
