= Takht-e Marmar Iwan =

Part of the Golestan Palace in Tehran, Iran

- ایوان تخت مرمر (Persian); ایوان دارالاماره (Persian); دیوانخانه (Persian)
- Interactive map of Takht-e Marmar Iwan
- Location: Tehran, Iran
- Part of: Golestan Palace

Site notes
- Architectural style: Iranian
- Current use: Museum
- Owner: Ministry of Cultural Heritage, Tourism and Handicrafts

Iran National Heritage List
- Official name: Iwan of Takht-e Marmar
- Type: Iwan
- Designated: 1956
- Reference no.: 416
- Conservation organization: Cultural Heritage, Handicrafts and Tourism Organization of Iran

Takht-e Marmar Iwan (Persian: ایوان تخت مرمر, lit. 'Iwan of the Marble Throne'), is an Iwan-style building in Golestan Palace, Tehran, Iran. It is the oldest surviving edifice in the former royal citadel, dating back to late 18th century. The Iwan is named after the marble-made throne it houses; Takht-e Marmar.

== History ==
Takht-e Marmar Iwan was among the royal constructions built by Karim Khan Zand (r. 1751–1779) inside an enormous Safavid era garden. After the fall of Zand dynasty, Agha Mohammad Khan Qajar (r. 1789–1797) became the Shah of Iran. It was during his reign that Karim Khan's edifice in Shiraz (main stronghold of the Zands) was demolished; all the precious items there, including its two tall monolith pillars, marble strones, mirrors and painted doors and curtains were transported to the new capital and were installed in the building.

== Takht-e Marmar ==
Around 1806, Fath-Ali Shah Qajar (nephew of the eunuch Agha Mohammad Shah), officially ordered the construction of a throne of yellow marble stones from Yazd, in Isfahan. It was named Takht-e Marmar or occasionally, Takht-e Soleimani.

== Occasional Use ==
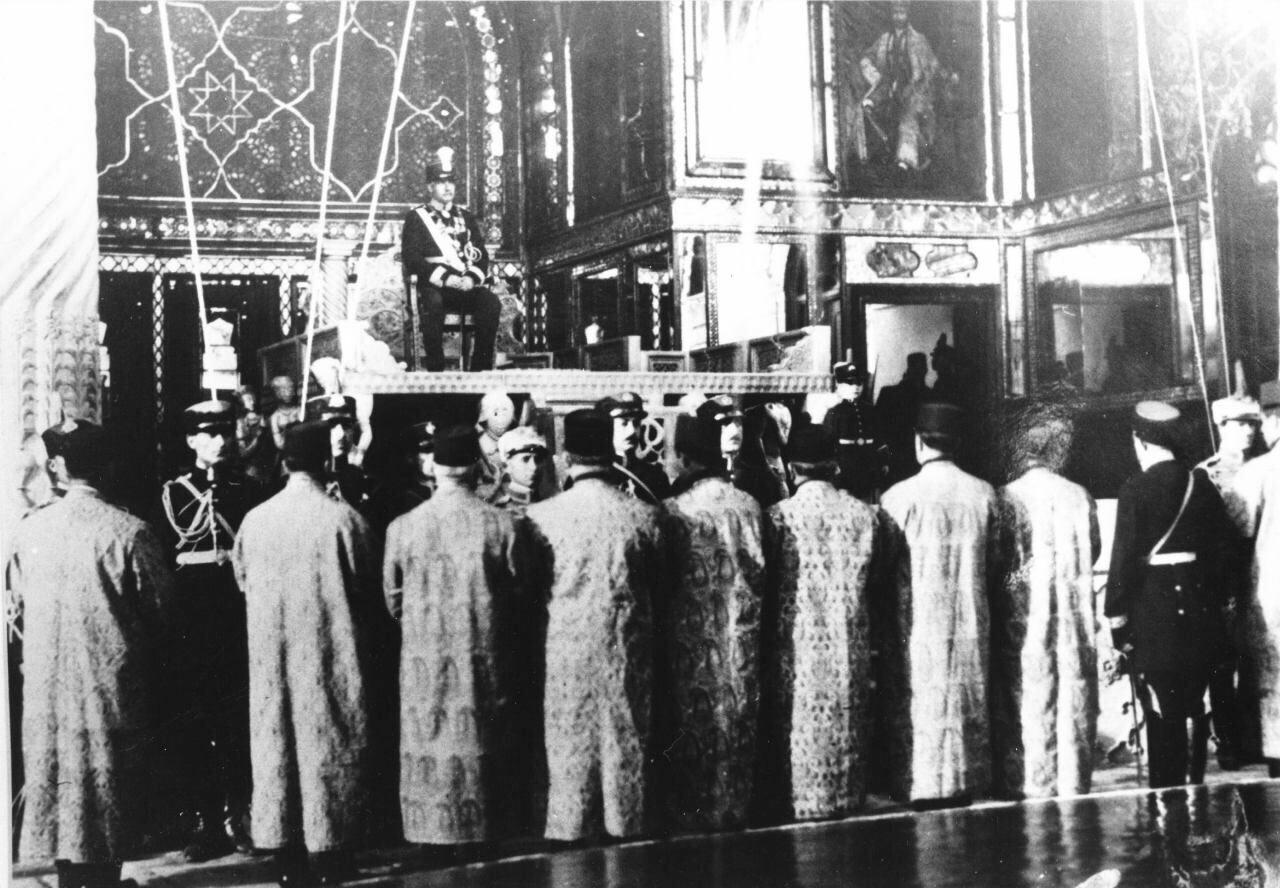
Reza Shah (r. 1925–1941), the founder of the Pahlavi dynasty, sitting on a chair on the Marble Throne, 1925

During the Qajar era, the portico was the main venue of celebrations and coronations. It was there that the shah would receive different classes of people during Nowruz ceremonies. It was also the site of the coronation of nearly all Qajar shahs. Reza Shah Pahlavi also crowned himself there on 16 December 1925, that being the last major royal event held around the Iwan.

== Contemporary era ==
Before the 1979 Iranian Revolution, Golestan Palace was occasionally used for private ceremonies of the Pahlavi dynasty and parts of it were open to public. After the outbreak of the Iran–Iraq War (1980–1988), the whole palace was closed. After major renovations, Golestan Palace was gradually reopened in 1995.

== 2026 Israeli-American attacks ==
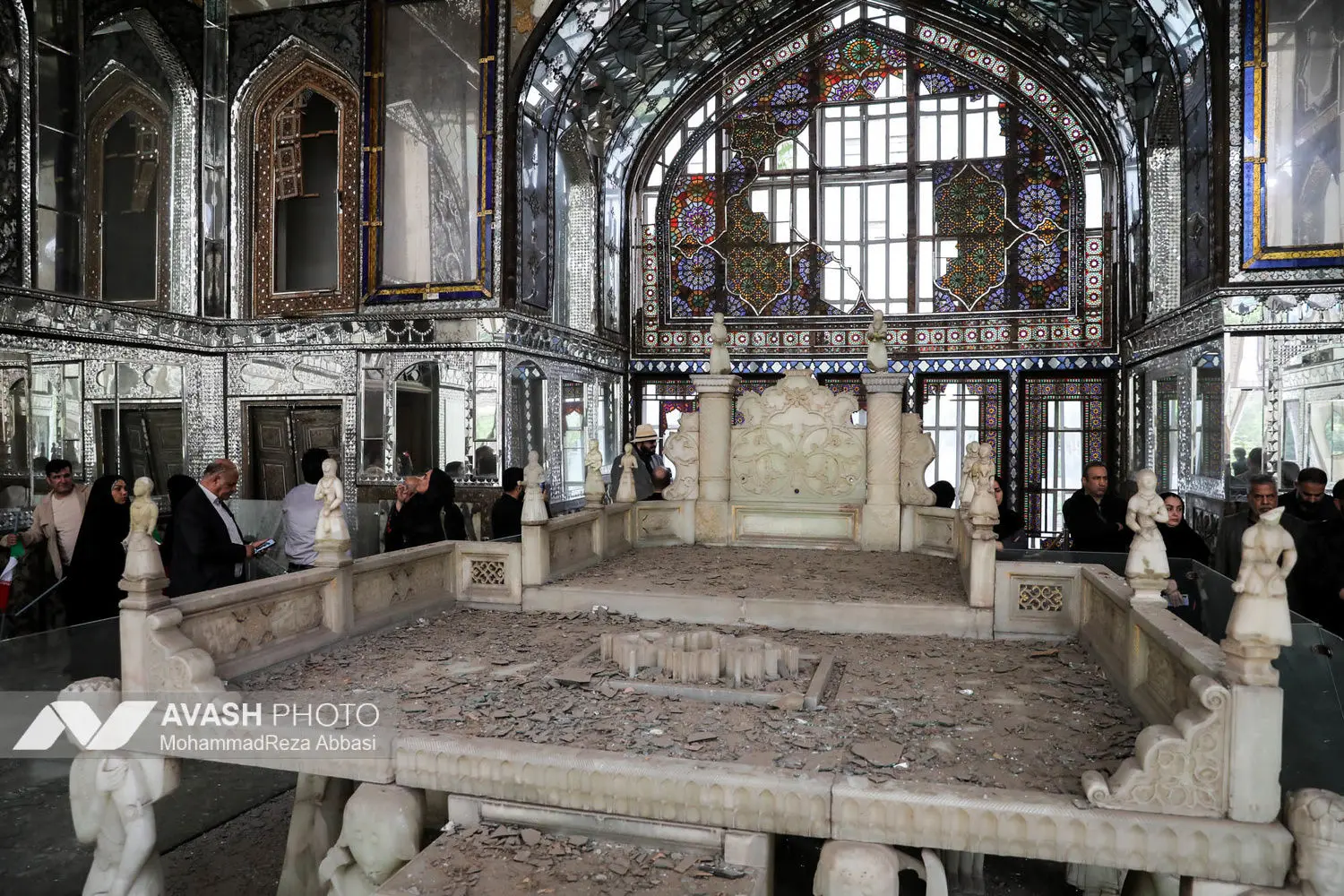
the iwan after the attacks

On 2 March 2026, Israeil-American forces bombed the nearby Meidan-e Arg and its surrounding governmental buildings. Due to shock waves of the huge blasts, Takht-Marmar Iwan, as well as the Marble Throne itself, (part of a World Heritage Site) was severely damaged.

== See also ==
- Shams-ol-Emareh: an edifice in Golestan Palace, with similar portico
- Qavam House: 19th-century edifice in Shiraz, with similar portico
