= Marble Throne =

Throne in Tehran, Iran

Coordinates: 35.6803°N 51.4205°E

The Marble Throne (Persian: تخت مرمر, romanized: Taxt-e Marmar) is a Qajar era throne in Golestan Palace, Tehran, Iran. It is housed in the eponymous edifice, Takht-e Marmar Iwan.

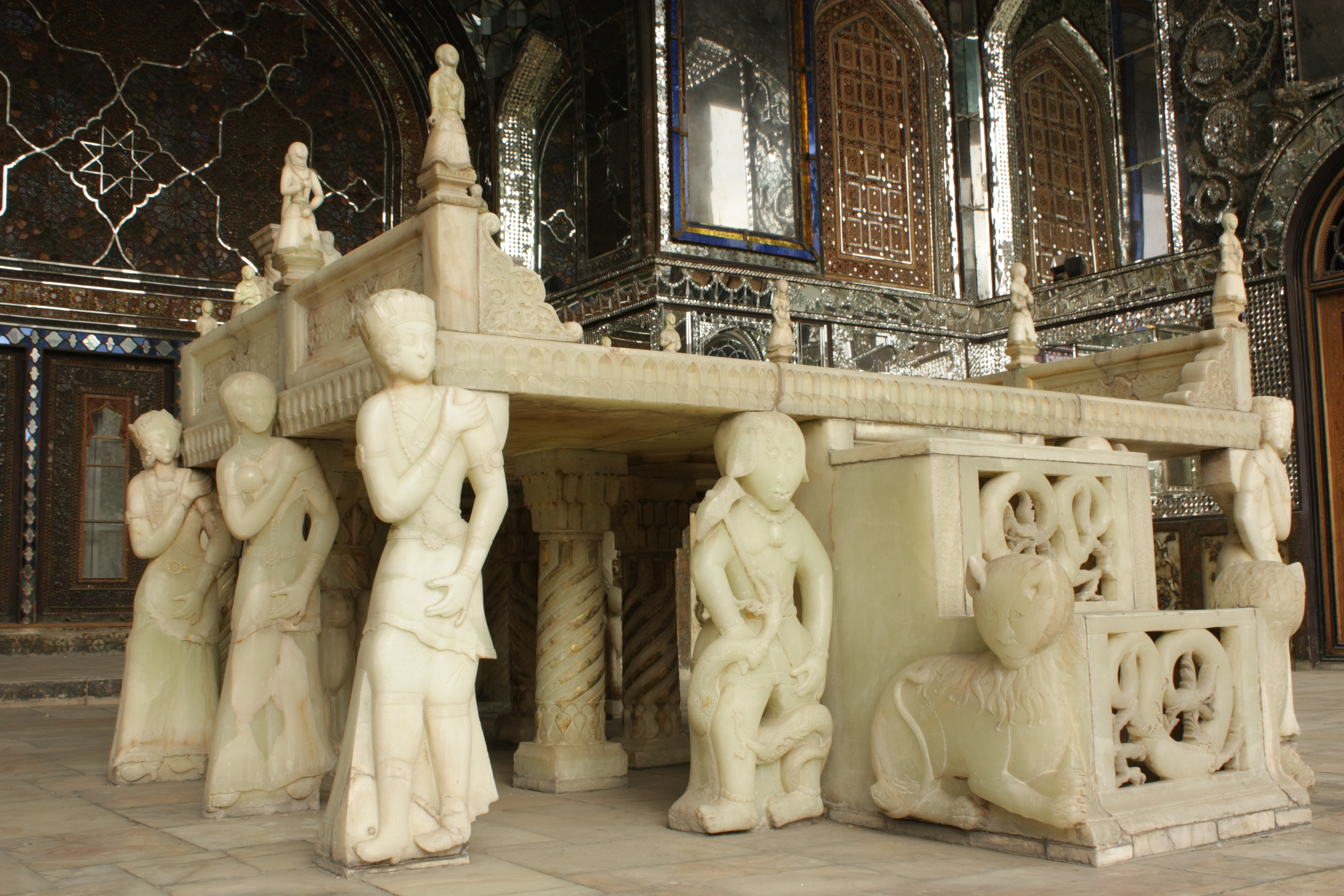
The Marble Throne as it appears in 2013

== History ==
The throne was commissioned by Fath-Ali Shah Qajar in 1805 (1221 AH). It was designed by Mirza Baba Shirazi (Naqqash Bashi) and royal stonecutter, Mohammad Ebrahim Esfahani. It consists of 65 marble stone pieces from a mine in Yazd. The throne's supports are carved in the shape of men, women, fairies, and demons.

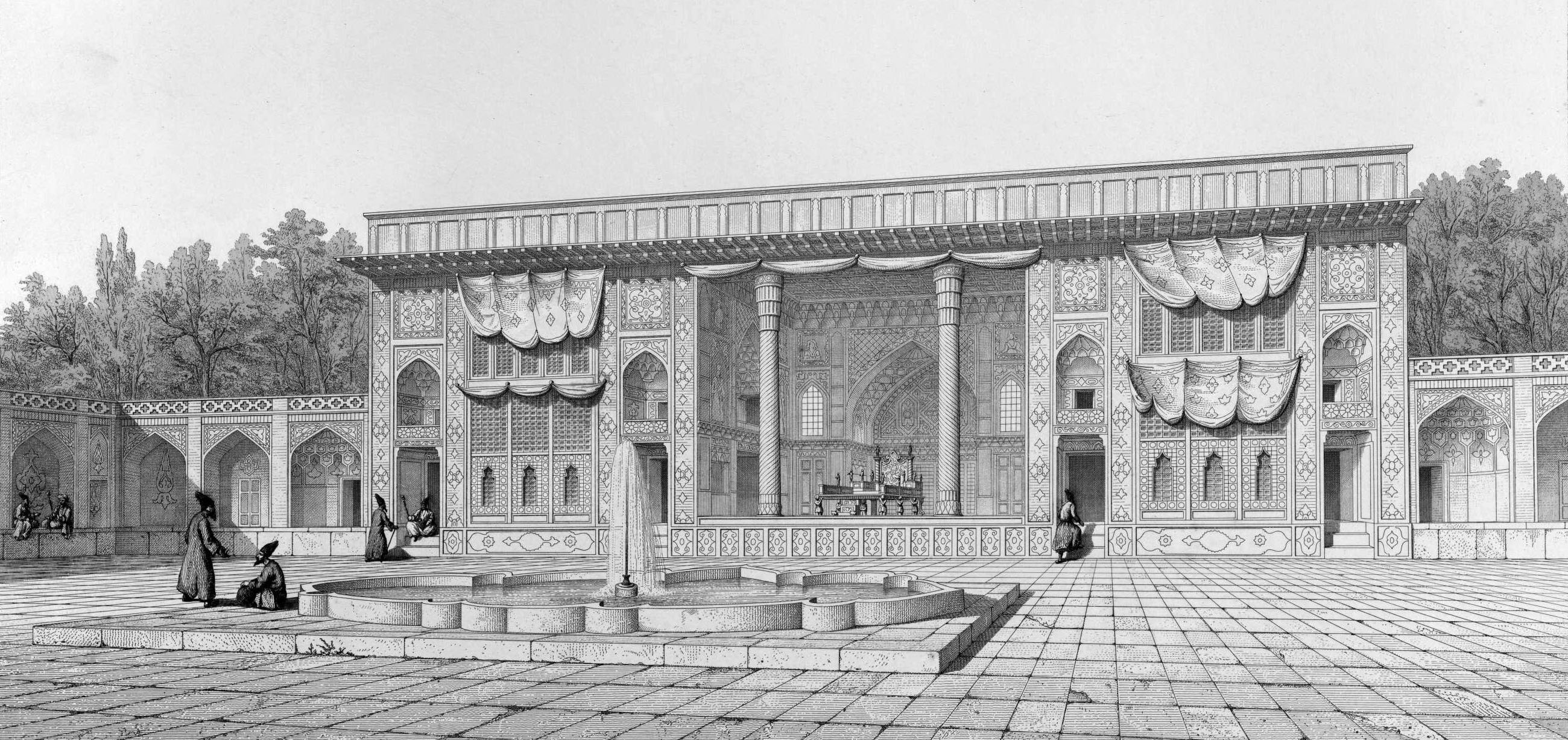
The Marble Throne visible in a drawing by Pascal Coste, 1840

In his book, "The History of Buildings in the Royal Citadel of Tehran", Yahya Zoka describes the construction of this Takht:

"As it was impossible to carry Tavus and Naderi Takhts, this Takht was made, modeled after Solomon the Prophet’s Takht who was the king of the Jews and was in possession of great power. [Thus], as Fat′h-Ali Shah was compared to him as for his wealth and power, this throne was named Solomon’s Takht after the original throne of Solomon which is said to have been carried in the sky and flown by genies and fairies, and would land to the wish of Solomon. After the throne was put in terrace, the terrace was given the name Takht-e Marmar''.

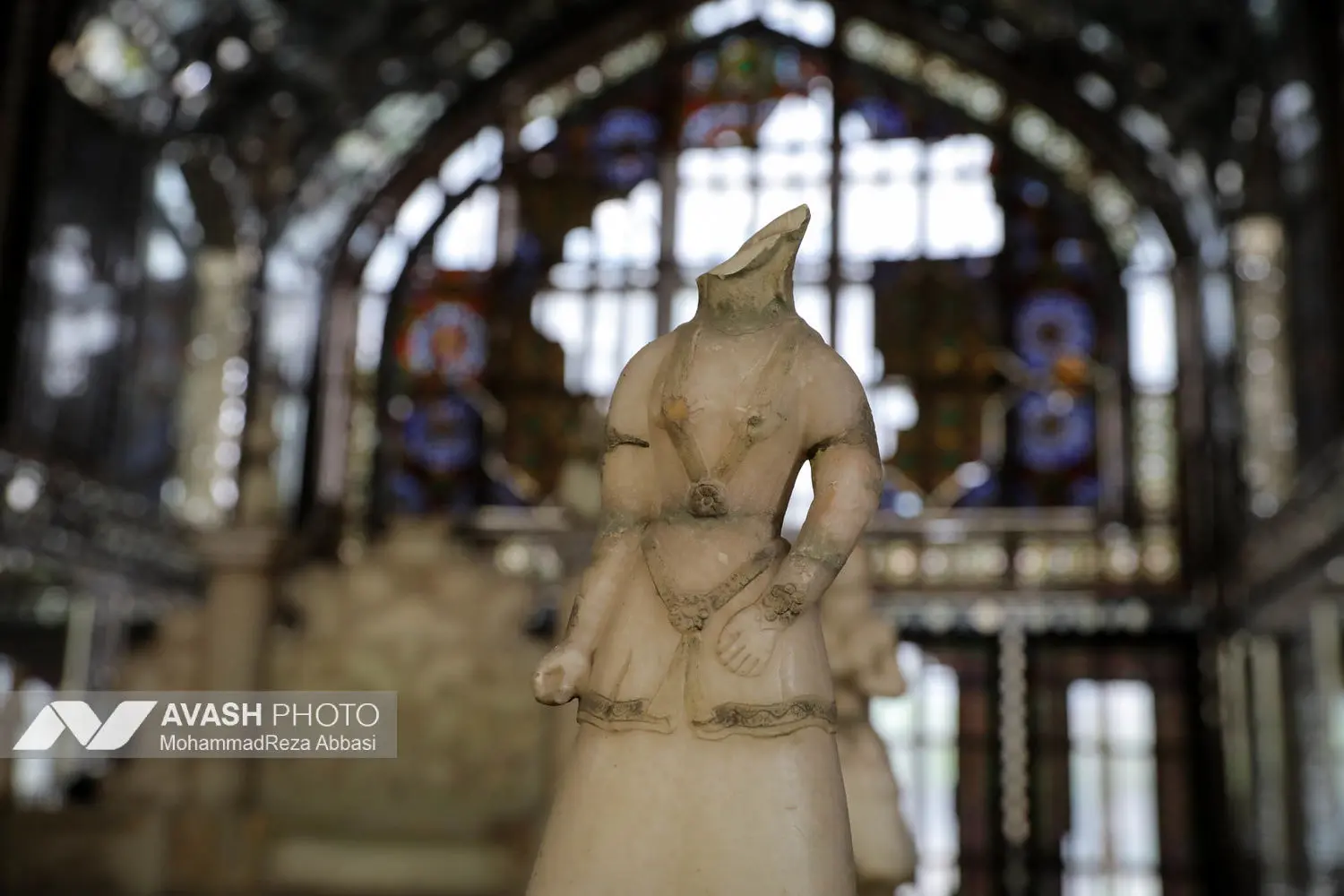
The broken head of one of the throne's statues following the 2026 airstrikes

On 2 March 2026, the Marble throne was damaged by the shockwave of an airstrike on Arg Square during the 2026 Iran war.

== Gallery ==
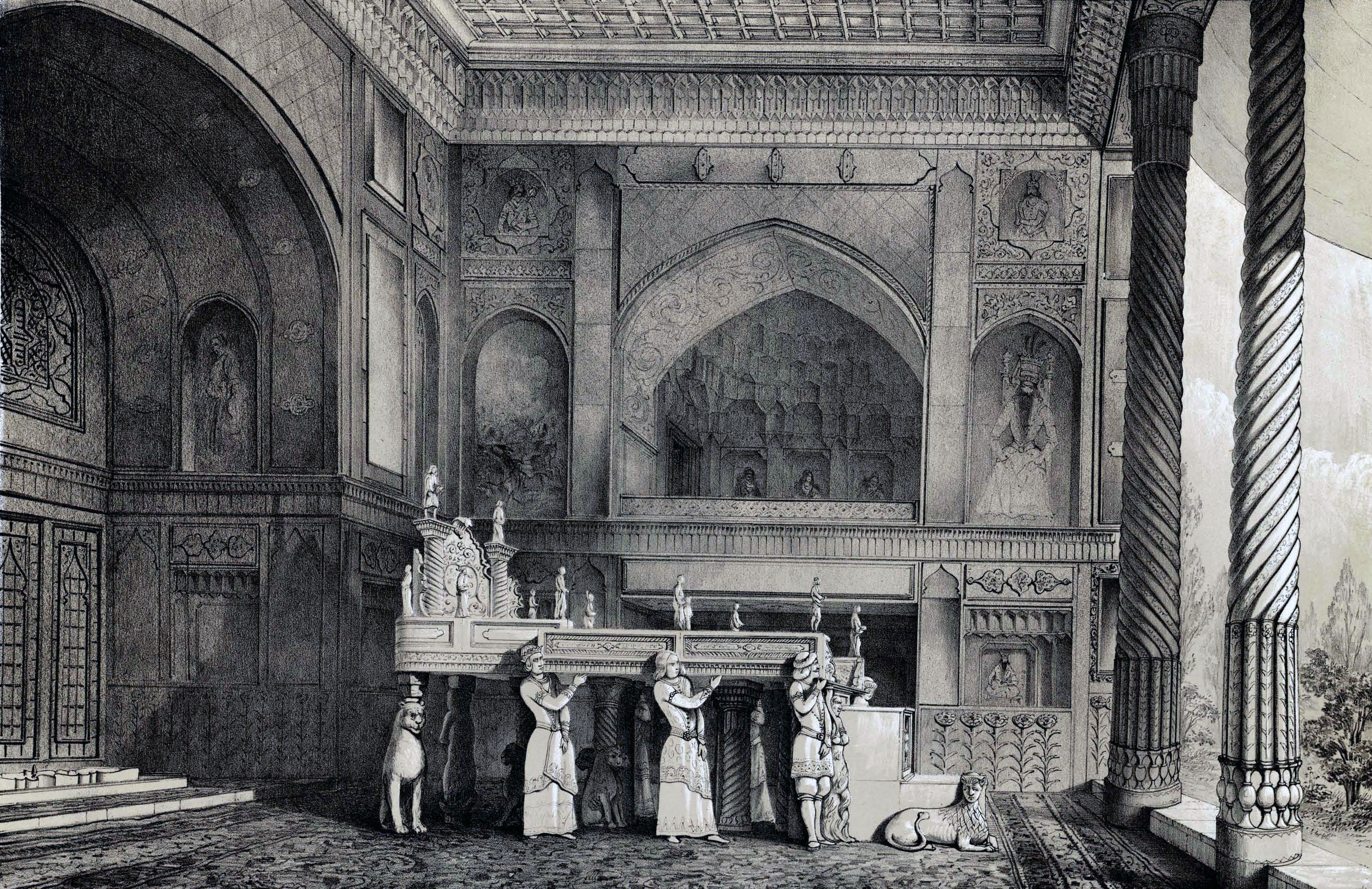
Drawing by Eugène Flandin, 1840

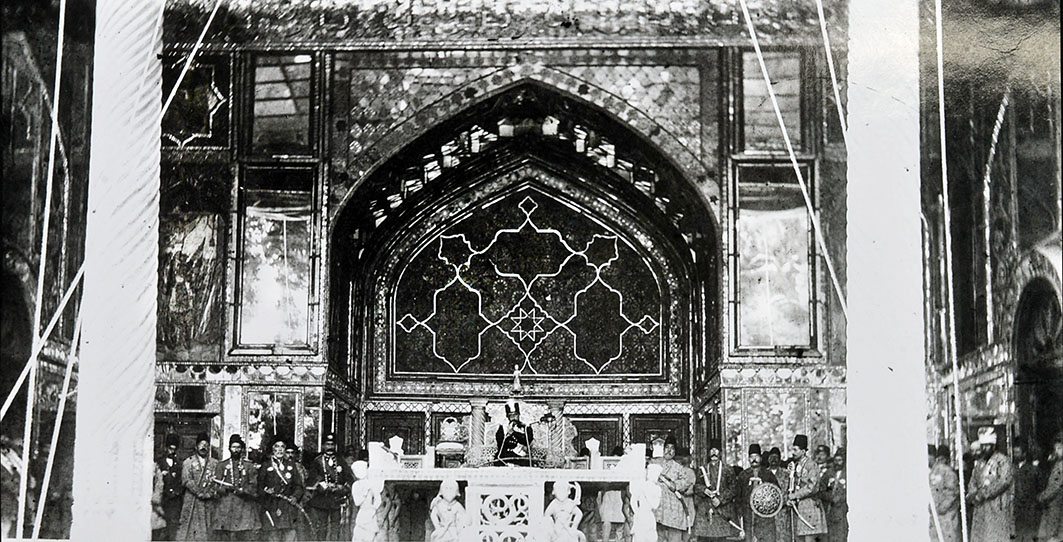
Mozaffar ad-Din Shah Qajar (r. 1896–1907) sitting on the Marble Throne

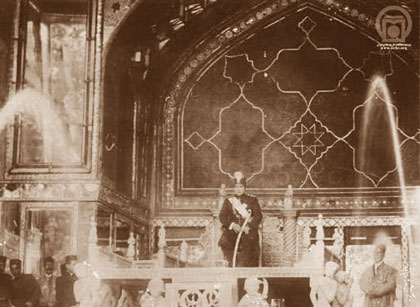
Ahmad Shah Qajar (r. 1909–1925) sittng on a chair on the Marble Throne, 1919

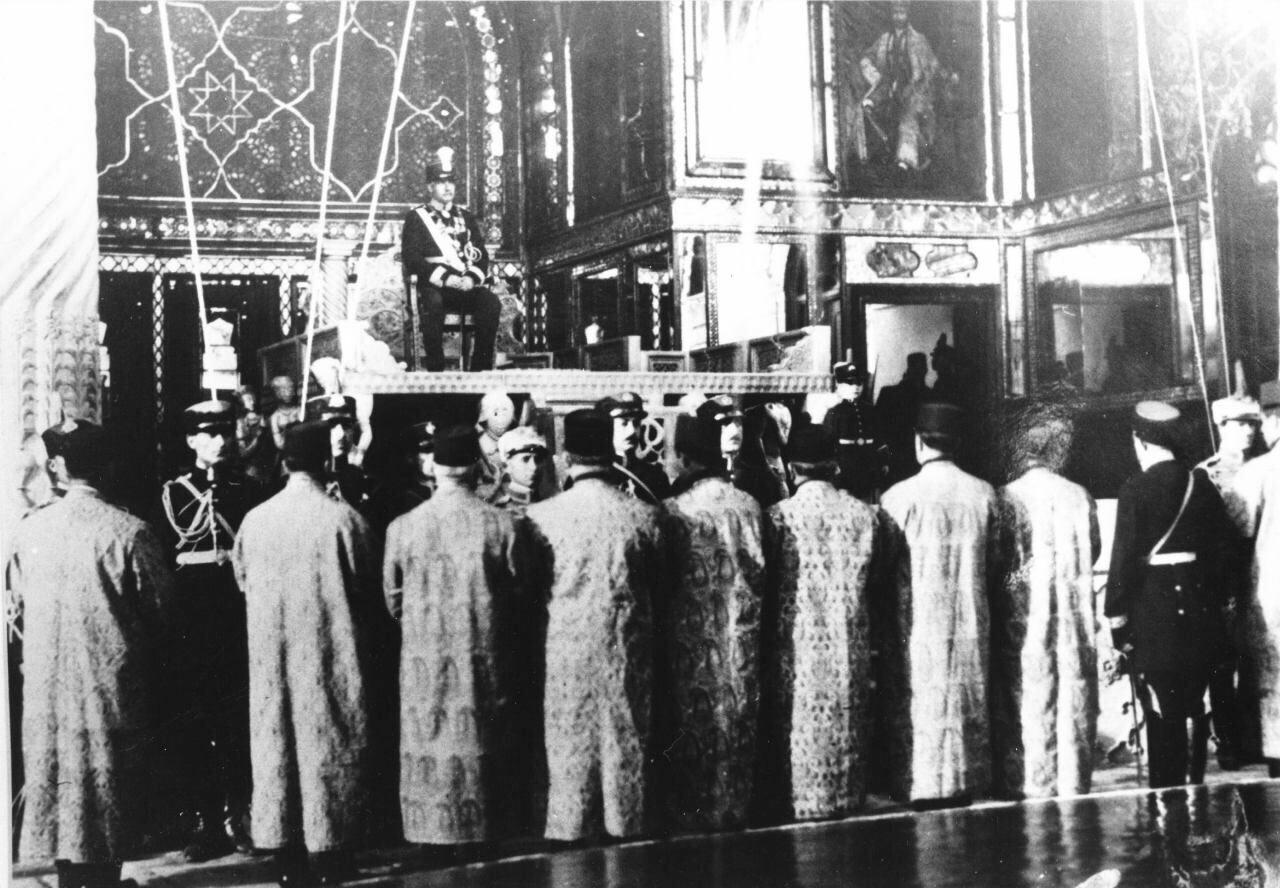
Reza Shah (r. 1925–1941), the founder of the Pahlavi dynasty, sitting on a chair on the Marble Throne, 1925

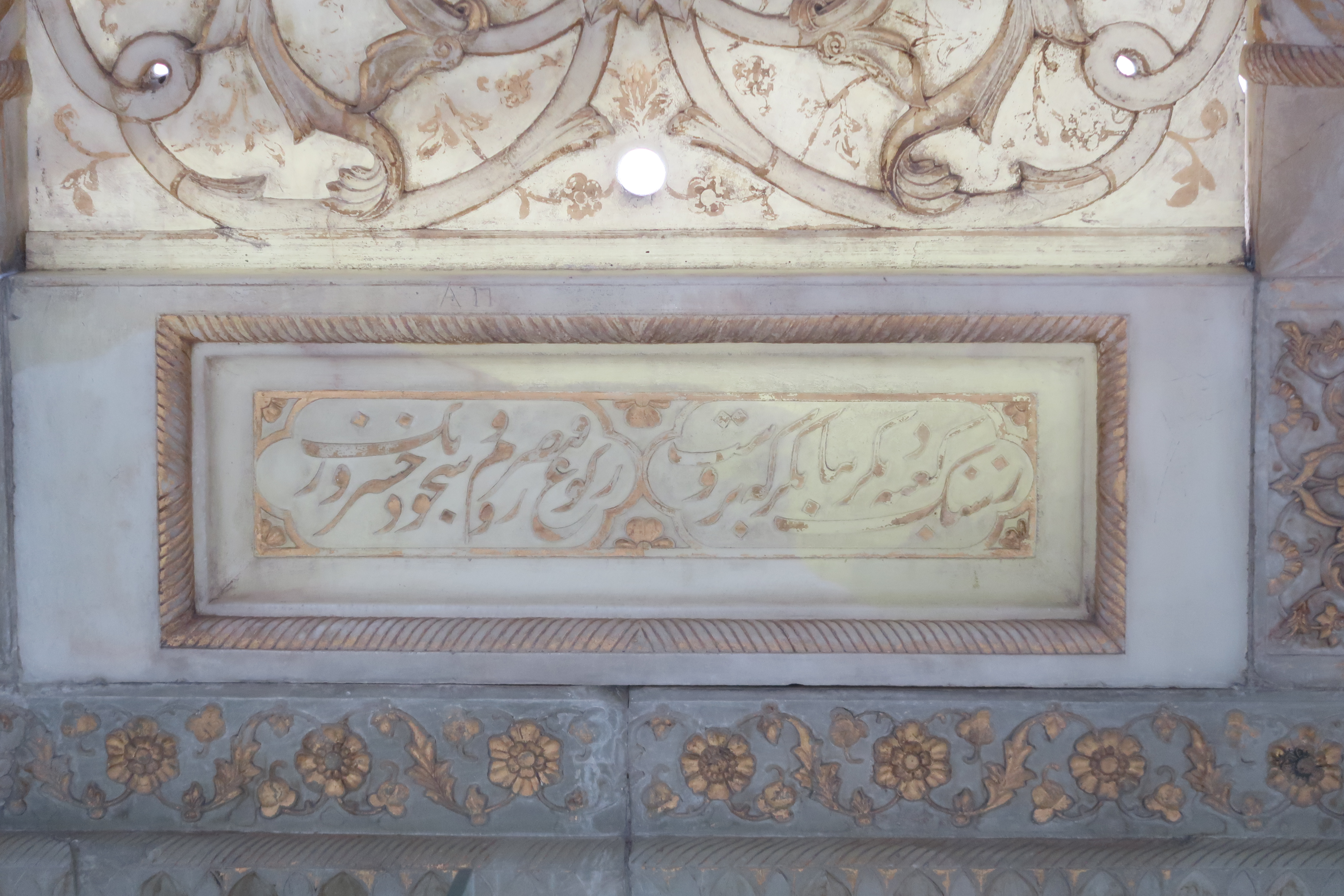

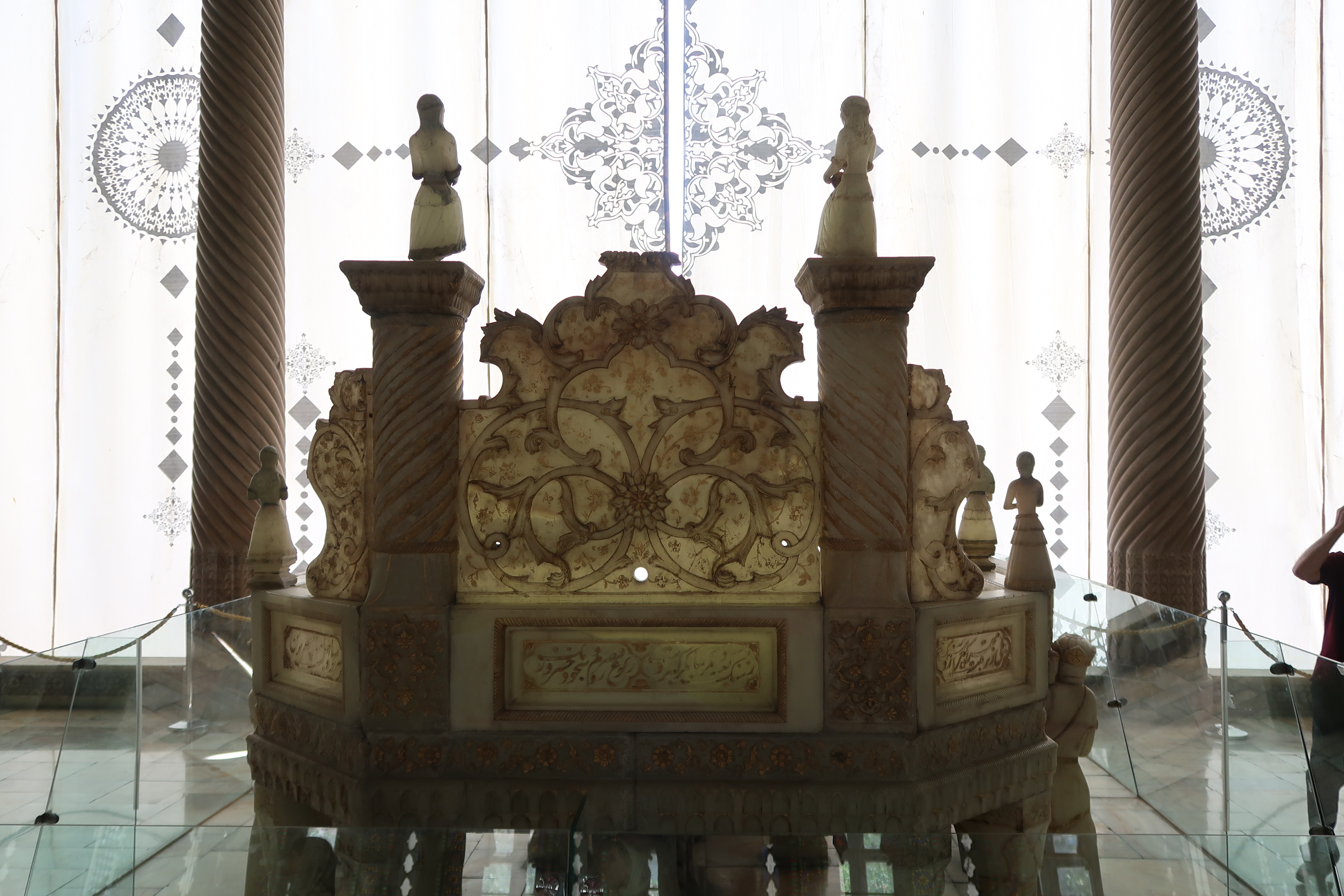

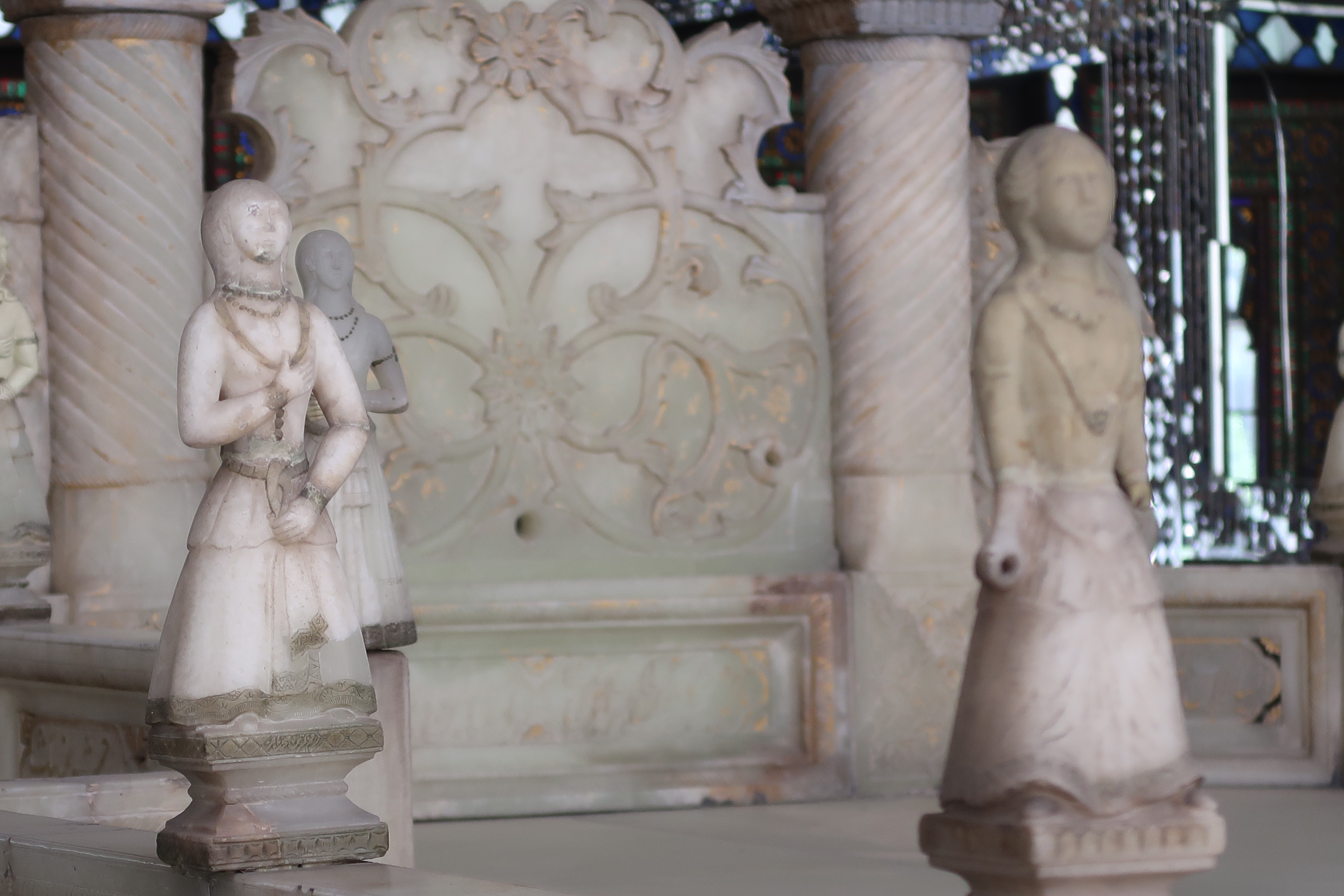
