= Ozanne (surname) =

Ozanne may refer to:

- Alfred Ozanne (1877–1961), Australian politician
- Jayne Ozanne, Anglican English evangelist
- Marie Ozanne (1906-1943), protester against the German treatment of slave labourers in the Channel Islands during World War II
- Marie-Élisabeth Ozanne (1739–1797), French painter
- Marjorie Ozanne (1897–1973), Guernsey author in Guernésiais and bird hospital founder
- Michael Ozanne, wheelchair rugby player
- Nicolas Ozanne (1728–1811), French artist
- Patricia Ozanne (1923–2009), rally driver
- Pierre Ozanne (1737–1813), French artist
- Robert Ozanne (1898–1941), French film actor
- Urbain Ozanne (1835–1903), French-born American political organizer, sheriff, and businessman

== See also ==
- Ozanne, river in France
- Mourant Ozannes, law firm
- Françoise Ozanne-Rivierre (1941–2007), linguist
