= Coronation of the French monarch =

Legitimation ceremony in the Kingdom of France

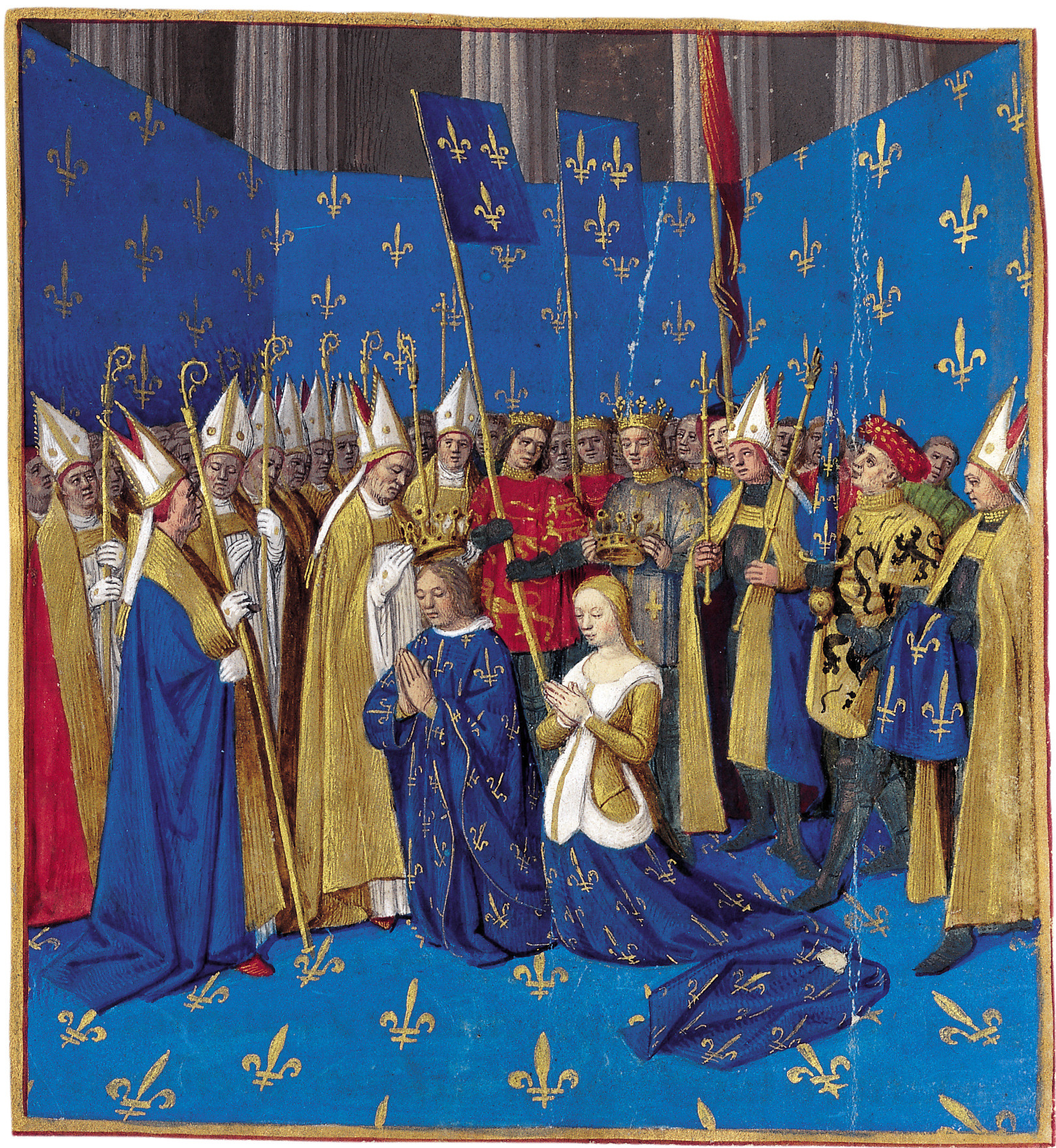
Coronation of Louis VIII and Blanche at Reims in 1223; a miniature from the Grandes Chroniques de France, c. 1450.

The accession of the King of France to the royal throne was legitimized by a ceremony performed with the Crown of Charlemagne at the Reims Cathedral. In late medieval and early modern times, the new king did not need to be anointed in order to be recognized as French monarch but ascended upon the previous monarch's death with the proclamation "Le Roi est mort, vive le Roi!" (Note: English: The [old] king is dead; long live the [new] King!) French queens were crowned either together with their husband at Reims or alone at Sainte-Chapelle or the Basilica of Saint-Denis.

The most important part of the French ceremony was not the coronation itself, but the Sacre – the anointing or unction of the king by the priest leading the ceremony. The Carolingian king Pepin the Short was anointed in Soissons (752) to legitimize the accession of the new dynasty. A second anointing of Pepin by Pope Stephen II took place at the Basilica of Saint-Denis in 754, the first to be performed by a pope. The unction served as a reminder of the baptism of king Clovis I in Reims by the archbishop, Remigius, in 496/499. The ceremony was transferred to Reims in 816 and was later completed with the use of the Holy Ampulla, found in 869 in the grave of the saint.

Since the ampulla, a Roman glass vial containing the balm due to be mixed with chrism, was allegedly brought by the dove of the Holy Spirit, the French monarchs claimed to receive their power by divine right. Out of respect for the supposedly miraculous oil, the king's shirt and the gloves put on after the unction of the hands were burned following the coronation. Exceptionally, the shirt worn by Louis XV was not burned. Instead, it was donated to the King of Portugal, John V, and is today at the National Palace of Mafra, guarded by the Royal and Venerable Confraternity of the Most Blessed Sacrament of Mafra.

The coronation regalia, such as the throne and sceptre of Dagobert I or crown and sword of Charlemagne, were kept in the Basilica of Saint-Denis near Paris and the liturgical instruments in Reims like the Holy Ampulla and chalice, where they are still partly preserved as well as in the Louvre and other Parisian museums. The Holy Ampulla was kept in a reliquary in the form of a round gold plaque thickly set with jewels in the center of which was a white enamelled representation of the dove of the Holy Spirit, upright with the wings open and pointing down, of which the Holy Ampulla itself formed the body.

The reliquary of the ampulla had a heavy chain by which it could be worn around the neck of the abbot of the Abbey of Saint-Remi (where it was normally kept) when he brought it, walking barefoot at the head of a procession of his monks under a canopy carried by four noblemen on horseback, the Hostages of the Holy Ampulla, from the abbey to the very steps of the high altar of the cathedral, where he turned the relic over to the Archbishop of Rheims for its use in the coronation ritual. All succeeding kings of France were anointed with this same oil – mixed with chrism prior to their coronation.

== The participants in the coronation ==
The king was crowned by the Archbishop of Reims who was assisted by four suffragan bishops of his ecclesiastical province, and of the Bishop of Langres and Chapter of the Cathedral of Reims. The established order of six bishops was:

- The Archbishop of Reims anointed and crowned the king.
- The Bishop of Laon carried the holy ampulla.
- The Bishop of Langres carried the scepter.
- The Bishop of Beauvais carried and showed the coat of arms or royal mantle.
- The Bishop of Chalons carried the royal ring.
- The Bishop of Noyon carried the belt.

To these were added the Abbot of the Abbey of Saint-Remi, guardian of the holy ampulla, and the Abbot of the Abbey of Saint-Denis, guardian of other regalia.

Peers are cited for the first time in 1203 (first convocation) and 1226. However, their first recorded participation in the coronation is made on the occasion of the coronation of Philip V of France on 9 January 1317. These are the six aforementioned ecclesiastical peers and the six lay peers (the great vassals of the King of France, in the modern era of royal princes or lords). In order of protocol, the six lay peers are:

- The Duke of Burgundy carried the royal crown, girded the king's sword, and gave him the order of chivalry.
- The Duke of Normandy carried the first square banner.
- The Duke of Aquitaine (or Guyenne, in texts, which is the same) carried the second square banner.
- The Count of Toulouse carried the spurs.
- The Count of Flanders carried the royal sword.
- The Count of Champagne presented the king with the war colour, which would be carried during battle, the count carried it during the ceremony.

The spiritual peerages were perpetual, and were never extinguished during the existence of the Kingdom of France. But as early as 1204, the roster of the lay peerages had been incomplete. Normandy had been absorbed into the French crown (1204); Toulouse in 1271, Champagne in 1284. Aquitaine was several times forfeited and restored, Burgundy became extinct in 1361 and again in 1477, and Flanders was ceded to the Empire in 1531. Hence, more often than not, princes of the royal blood and high-ranking members of the nobility acted as representatives of the ancient lay peerages. Spiritual peers were also represented if their see is vacant or they are unable to attend (such as the bishops of Langres, Noyon and Beauvais, who were enemies of Charles VII during the Hundred Years' War).

== Coronation sites ==
After the first two kings of the House of Capet had been consecrated elsewhere (Hugh Capet in the cathedral of Noyon, Robert II in Orléans, both in 987), subsequent ceremonies were held at Reims Cathedral, beginning in 1027. However, there were a few notable exceptions:

- Louis VI was consecrated on August 3, 1108, at Orléans Cathedral. He was anointed by Daimbert, the Archbishop of Sens. He feared that his half-brother, Philip, Count of Mantes, would prevent his access to Reims. The Archbishop of Reims contested the coronation, which should have been his place by custom, but to no avail; the choice of the coronation site and the participants was deemed to be a prerogative of the crown.
- John the Posthumous was never consecrated, as although he was King of France from the moment of his birth (as the posthumous and only surviving son of Louis X), he died a few days after being born.
- Henry of Navarre was consecrated King of France as Henry IV on February 27, 1594, at Chartres Cathedral. Reims was then held by his enemies, the House of Guise and the Catholic League.
- After the French Revolution, Louis XVIII decided to dispense with a consecration. However, his successor, Charles X revived the consecration at Reims. He was the last king to be anointed there.

On December 16, 1431, Henry VI of England let himself be crowned as King of France at Notre Dame de Paris, according to a ritual similar to that established by his great-grandfather Charles V of France. This was an attempt to counter the coronation of Henry's uncle and rival, Charles VII of France, who had been consecrated at Reims in 1429.

== The French Sacre from 1364 to 1825 (Charles V to Charles X) ==
Like the English coronation ritual, the French ritual after being subject to considerable influence from the Roman ritual in the 12th and 13th centuries reverted to earlier French forms in the 14th century. The Roman text and ritual, however, were not completely abandoned but combined with the earlier texts and ritual so that this fourth and final recension was nearly twice the length of the earlier recension.

The king spends the night before his Sacre at the Palace of Tau and is awakened in the morning by the clergy and officials involved in the coronation ritual. They assist in dressing the king for the Sacre and the king then chooses which of his nobles will serve as the Hostages for the Sainte Ampoule and the clergy, as well, also swear to return the Sainte Ampoule to the Abbey of St. Remi after the Sacre.

The king enters Reims Cathedral after the singing of the canonical hour of Prime. At the king's entrance into the cathedral a prayer is said and, in the 17th and 18th centuries, the hymn 'Veni Creator Spiritus' is sung. Upon his entrance into the choir the prayer, "God, the Ruler of heaven and earth, etc." is said and Terce is sung as the abbot and monks of the Abbey of Saint-Remi come in procession bringing the Sainte Ampoule in its reliquary hanging by it chain around the abbot's neck while four monks in alb bear a silk canopy over him. Upon arriving at the entrance of the cathedral the Archbishop of Reims and the other archbishops and bishops present solemnly swear to return the Sainte Ampoule to them after the Sacre. Then the abbot and monks enter the cathedral and proceed to the altar, everyone bowing reverently as they pass before them.

The coronation proper begins with the bishops' petition that the traditional rights of the Church be maintained and the king's reply, followed by the king's taking of the coronation oath, in the Bourbon era on the Reims Gospel. Then the Recognition takes place followed by the singing of the Te Deum. Then the prayer, "Inscrutable God, etc." is and then the buskins and spurs are placed upon the king's feet and his invested and gird with the Coronation Sword, Joyeuse, with the formula "Accept this sword from our hands, etc." Then the antiphon: "I was glad when they said to me, let us go into the house of the Lord" (Psalm 122:1). The king removes his coat and other outerwear and the special silver latchets on his silk shirt are opened to expose his chest, upper back and the joints of his arms. While special versicle and response and a collect (unique to the French rite) are said, a paten with Chrism on it is place on the altar, the Abbot of St. Remi presents the Saint Ampoule to the Archbishop, who with a small golden stylus removes a small particle from the contents of the Sainte Ampoule and carefully mixes it with the Chrism on the paten.

The king kneels while the Litany of the Saints is chanted by two archbishops or bishops, concluding with two prayers. The Archbishop then says the formal prayer of consecration:

God eternal, All powerful, Creator and Governor of the Heavens and the Earth, Maker and Disposer of angels and of men, King of Kings, Lord of Lords, Thou who madest Abraham Thy faithful servant to triumph over his enemies, who hast raised to the highest in the Kingdom David, Thy humble servant, and hast delivered him out of the mouth of the lion, and out of the paw of the beast, and likewise from Goliath, and from the malicious sword of Saul, and from all his enemies, and has enriched Solomon with the wondrous gift of wisdom and of peace, forgive and accept our humble prayers, and multiply the gifts of Thy blessings on this Thy servant, who with all humble devotion, we, with one accord, choose for King, and we beseech Thee encompass him evermore, and in all places with the right hand of Thy power, so that strengthened by the fidelity of Abraham, possessed of the patience of Joshua, inspired with the humility of David, adorned with the wisdom of Solomon, he may be to Thee ever pleasing, and walk evermore without offence in the way of justice, and henceforth in such wise succour, direct, guard and uplift the church of the whole kingdom, and the people belonging thereto, may he administer with puissance and right royally the rule of Thy power against all enemies visible and invisible, may he not abandon his rights over the kingdoms of the Franks, the Burgundians, and of Aquitania, but aided by Thee inspire them with their sometime loyalty so that made glad by the fidelity of all his people, and provided with the helmet of Thy protection, and ever guarded with the invincible buckler, and compassed about with the celestial armies, he may happily triumph over his enemies, cause the infidel to fear his power, and with joy bring peace to those who fight under Thy banner. Adorn him by many a gracious blessing, with the virtues with the which Thou hast enriched Thy faithful ones aforesaid, counsel him richly in the government of the kingdom, and anoint him plenteously with the grace of the Holy Spirit, etc.

The Archbishop, sitting, then anoints the king with the Chrism in the form of a cross on the top of the head, on the breast, between the shoulders, on both shoulders and on the joints of both arms, each time saying:

I anoint thee king with holy oil in the name of the Father, and of the Son, and of the Holy Spirit.

And all, within the sound of his voice, each time respond: "Amen". While this anointing was taking place the choir sang the Antiphon:

Zadok the priest and the prophet Nathan anointed Solomon King in Jerusalem, and did proclaim this right joyfully, saying, May the king live forever.

The Archbishop then said these prayers:

God Almighty anoint Thou this king to the government, as Thou hast anointed those priests, and kings and prophets and martyrs, who by faith have subdued kingdoms, exercised justice, and obtained the promises. May this Thy most holy unction fall upon his head, descend within, and penetrate even unto his very heart, and may he by Thy grace be made worthy of the promises, the which the most famous kings have obtained, so that in all happiness he may reign in this present life, and may be one with them in Thy heavenly kingdom, for the sake of our Saviour Jesus Christ, Thy Son, who was anointed with the oil of gladness above his fellows, and by virtue of the cross has triumphed over the powers of the air, and has destroyed Hell, and vanquished the kingdom of the Evil One, and is ascended into Heaven as conqueror, to whom belongs all victory and glory and power, and who lives with Thee, and reigns in unity with Thee and the Holy Spirit to all eternity.

O God, the Strength of the Elect, and the uplifter of the humble, who in the beginning didst punish the world with a flood of waters, and didst make known by the dove carrying the bough of olive, that peace was yet anew restored to the earth, and hast with the holy anointing oil consecrate as priest Aaron Thy servant, and by the infusion of this unction hast appointed the priests and kings and prophets to govern the people of Israel, and hast by the prophetic voice of Thy Servant David foretold that with oil should the face of the church be made to shine, so we pray Thee, all-powerful Father, that Thy good pleasure may be sanctified in the blessing of this Thy servant with the oil of this heavenly dove, so that he may bring as did the dove of old, peace to the people committed to his charge. May he follow with diligence the example of Aaron in the service of God, and may he ever attain in his judgments to all that is most excellent in wisdom and equity and with Thy aid, and by the oil of this unction, make him to bring joy to all his people through Jesus Christ our Lord.

May Jesus Christ our Lord and God, and Son of God, who by the Father was anointed with the oil of gladness above all others who are one with Him, by this present infusion of the sacred unction pour upon thy head the blessing of the Holy Spirit, and make it go even unto the innermost recesses of thy heart, so that thou canst by this visible and material gift, perceive the things invisible, and after having with right moderation accomplished the temporal kingdom, mayest thou reign with Him eternally for the sake of Jesus Christ our Saviour.

Then the Archbishop and the assisting priests and deacons close the silver latchets of the king's shirt which opened for the anointing.

After this, the king, standing up, was vested in the tunicle, dalmatic and royal mantle, all of 'azure blue' velvet sprinkled with fleurs-de-lys of gold, representing the three Catholic orders of subdeacon, deacon and priest. by the Grand Chamberlain of France. Kneeling again, the king was anointed in the palms of both hands by the Archbishop, who recited the formula Unguantur manus istae, as follows:

Be those hands anointed with sanctified oil, as kings and prophets were anointed, and as Samuel anointed David king, so that you be blessed and constituted king in this kingdom, that the Lord your God gave you to rule and govern. This may He vouchsafe to grant, Who lives and reigns God, with the Father and the Holy Spirit, for ever and ever.

Thereafter the Archbishop concluded the ceremonies of the anointing by reciting the prayer Deus, qui es iustorum gloria.

After this the royal gloves are blessed with two prayers (adapted from those used to bless those of a bishop) and are placed upon the king's hands. Then the ring is blessed with the prayer "Bless, O Lord, and sanctify this ring, etc." and placed upon the king's hand with the original French formula, "Receive the ring, etc." and the prayer "God to whom belongs all power, etc." Then the scepter is placed into his right hand with the formula "Receive the scepter, the sign of kingly power, etc." and the prayer "Lord, the fount of all good things, etc." and the Hand of Justice in his left hand with the form "Receive the Rod of virtue and equity, etc." Then the peers were summoned by name to come near and assist. The Archbishop of Reims took the Crown of Charlemagne from the altar and says the forms "God crown thee with a crown of glory, etc.", "Receive this crown, etc." (a conflation of the old French and the Roman forms) and set it on the king's head, while the other eleven peers touched it with their right hands. Immediately after the Coronation, the Archbishop recited the prayer Deus perpetuitatis: "God of eternity, the Commander of all powers, etc." The Archbishop then says a number of blessings (all of them also found in other coronation rites).

After this, the king was lifted up into his throne on the rood screen by the lay peers, as the Archbishop said the words "Stand fast and hold firm the place, etc." and as the choir sings the antiphon:

Let thy hand be strengthened and your right hand exalted. Let justice and judgment be the preparation of thy Seat and mercy and truth go before thy face

The Archbishop says the prayer "God, who gave to Moses victory, etc." and kisses the king with the words "May the king live forever" and his cry is taken up by the peers and all the people present as they acknowledged him as their duly anointed, crowned and enthroned king.

Mass is then said, with the collect "God, who didst visit those who are humble, etc.", the Epistle is Lev. 26:6–9 and the Gospel is Matthew 22:15–22, the king receiving Holy Communion under both species (bread and wine). At the conclusion of the Mass the Oriflamme is blessed.

The king's return to Paris and his Joyous Entry into the capital through the gate facing the Abbey of St. Denis (i.e., the same exit by which his corpse would later be brought for burial in the same abbey church) completed the inauguration of the French king

=== Coronation of the heir ===
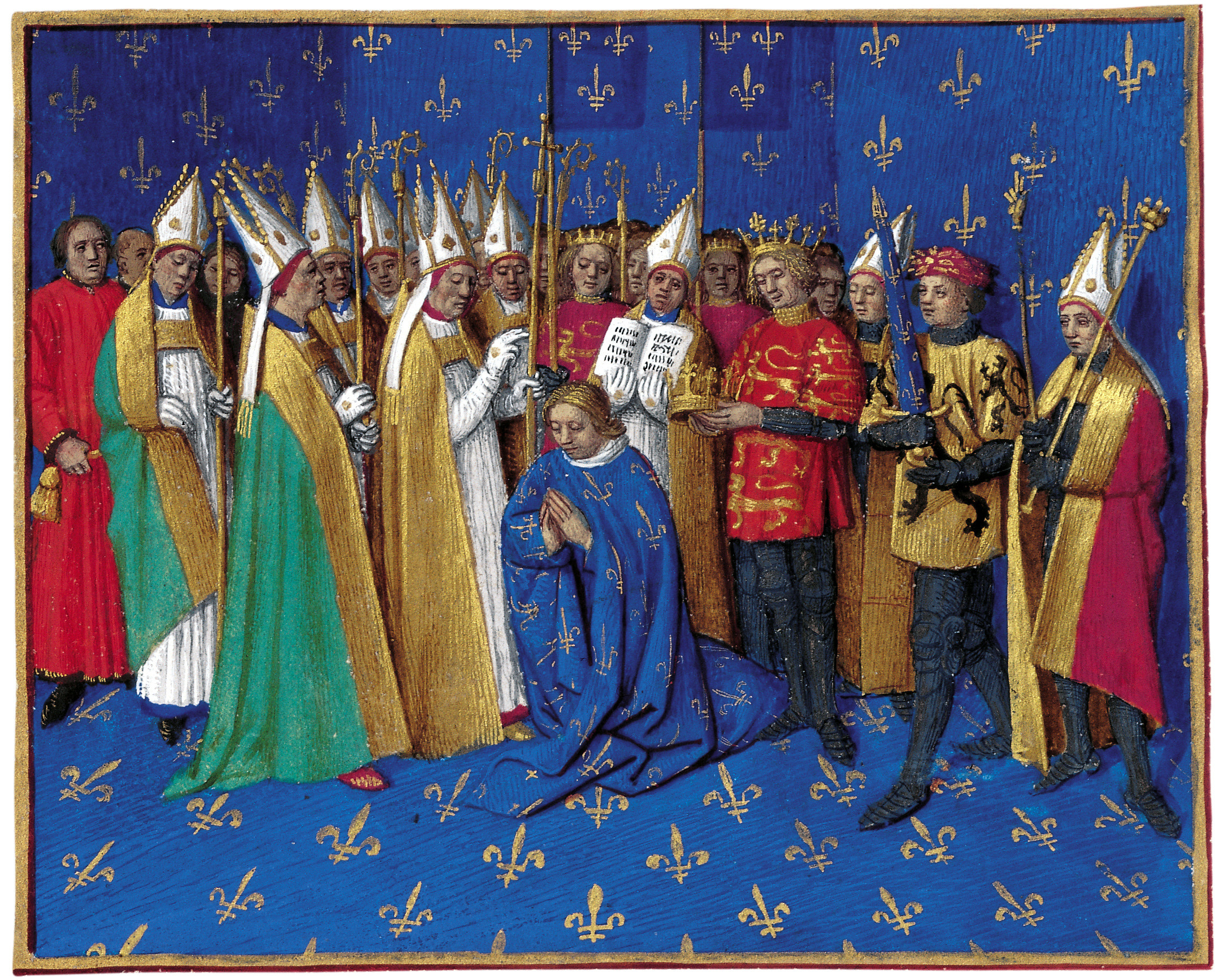
Coronation of Philip, son of King Louis VII of France, as junior king

During the Middle Ages, Capetian Kings of France chose to have their heirs apparent crowned during their own lifetime in order to avoid succession disputes. This practice was later adopted by Angevin Kings of England and Kings of Hungary. From the moment of their coronation, the heirs were regarded as junior kings (rex iunior), but they exercised little power and were not included in the numbering of monarchs. The nobility disliked this custom, as it reduced their chances to benefit from a possible succession dispute.

The last heir apparent to the French throne to be crowned during his father's lifetime was the future Philip II of France. The practice was eventually abandoned by all kingdoms that had adopted it, as the rules of primogeniture became stronger.

== Imperial ceremony ==
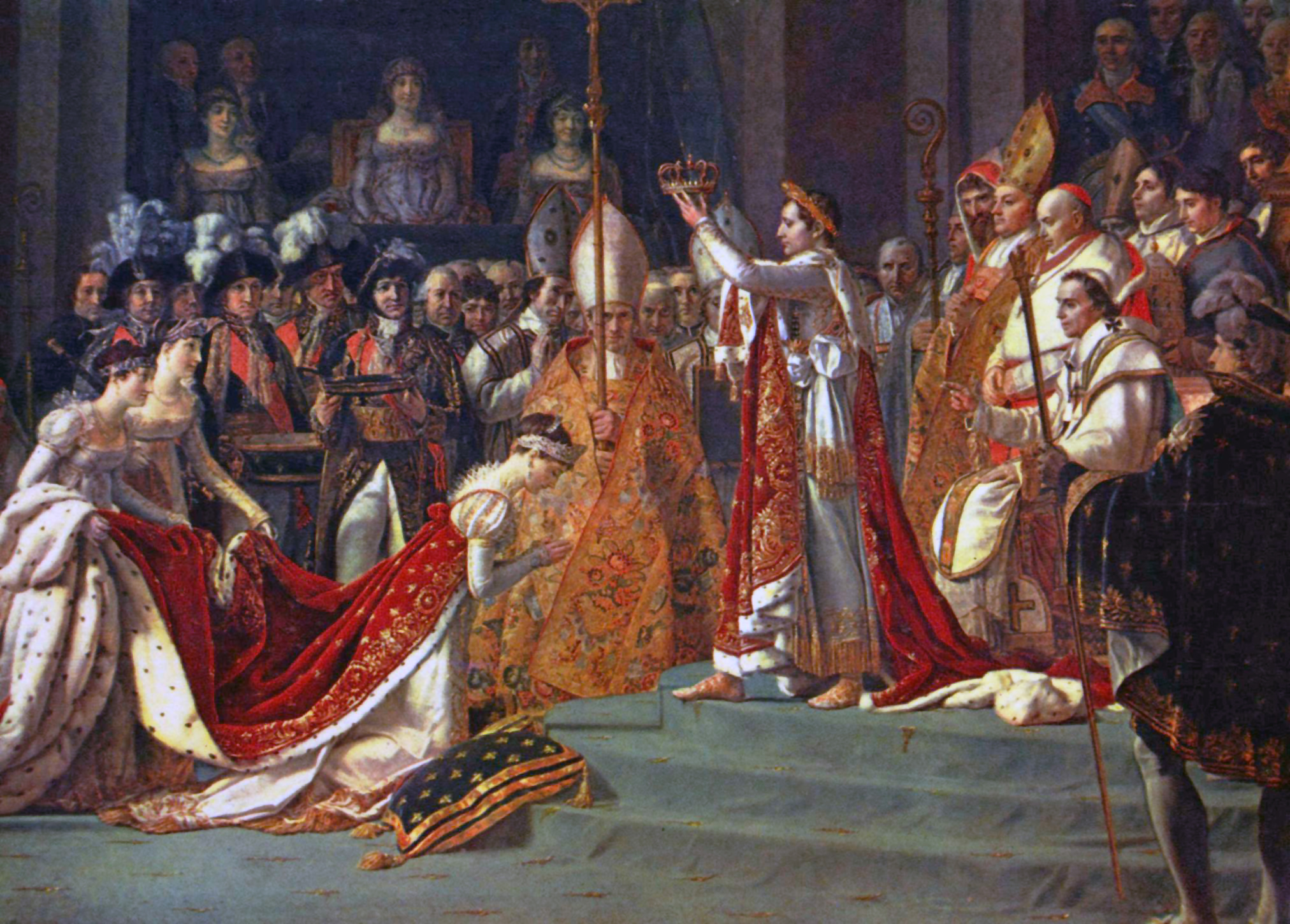
Coronation of Emperor Napoleon I of France at Notre-Dame de Paris. Napoleon crowned himself as "Emperor of the French" during this ceremony, then crowned his consort Josephine as Empress.

During the First French Empire, Emperor Napoleon I and Empress Josephine were crowned in December 1804 in an extremely elaborate ritual presided over by Pope Pius VII and conducted at the Notre Dame Cathedral in Paris. The pope and prelates entered Notre Dame in procession, followed by Napoleon and Joséphine with the Imperial Regalia preceding them. The regalia were placed on the altar and blessed by the pope, who then seated himself upon a throne to the left of the altar. Following this Napoleon was anointed by the pontiff three times on the head and hands, with the new emperor reportedly yawning several times during this act and the remainder of the ceremony. The high point of the ceremony came when Napoleon advanced to the altar, took the crown and placed it upon his own head. Replacing this with a laurel wreath of gold made in the ancient Roman style, he then crowned his wife, who knelt before him. Six months later, Napoleon was crowned King of Italy at Milan with the Iron Crown of Lombardy.

Emperor Napoleon III chose not to have a coronation ceremony. However, to celebrate the Exposition Universelle in 1855, the Crown of Napoleon III was made, but destroyed in 1887, and a small consort's crown was made for his wife, Empress Eugenie, which remains in the possession of the French government.

== Extinction of the ceremony ==
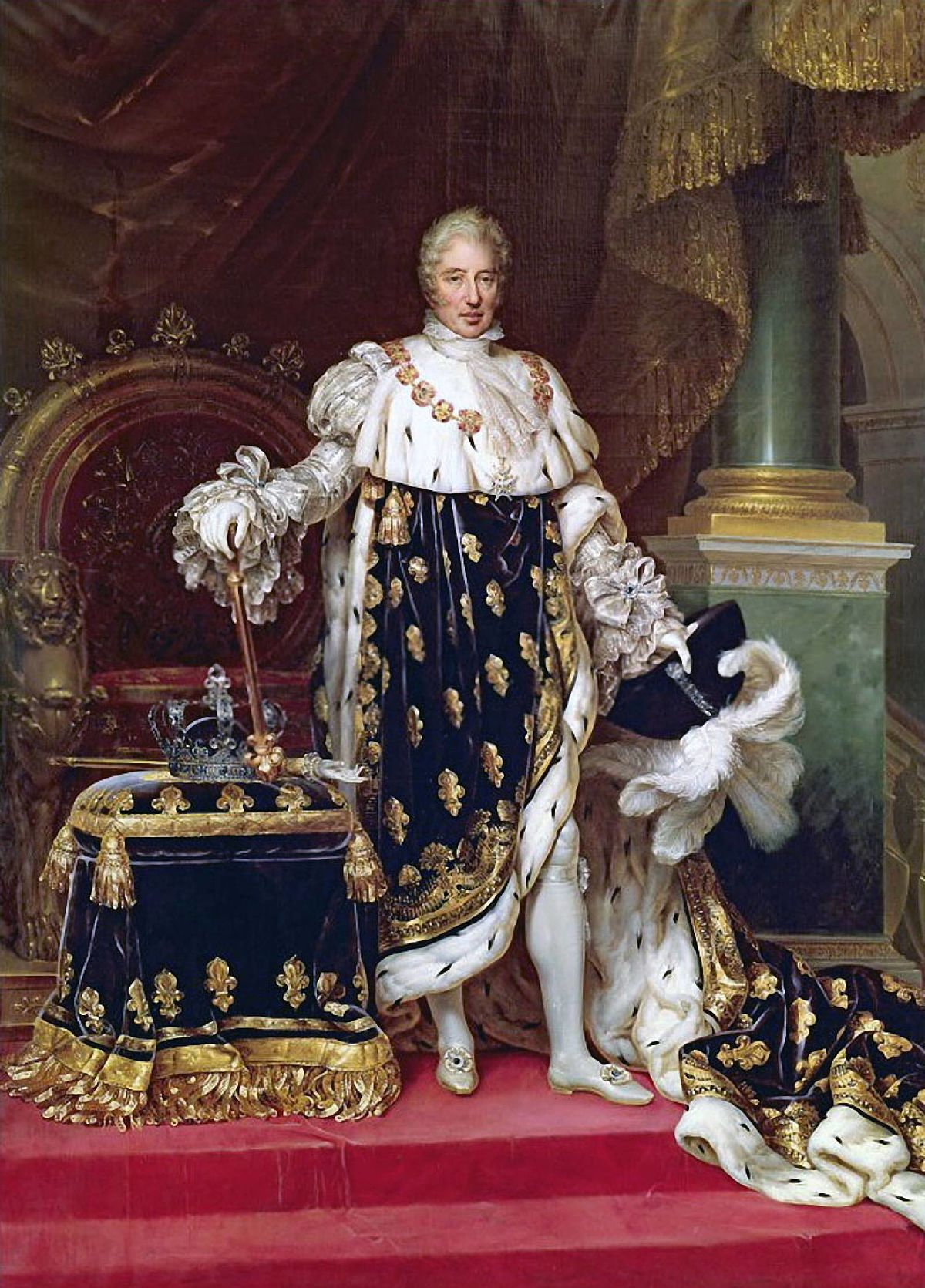
In 1825, Charles X became the last French King to be crowned at Reims.

The last French royal coronation was that of King Charles X in 1825, with Archbishop The Duke of Latil officiating in Rheims Cathedral. Charles' decision to be crowned, in contrast to his predecessor, Louis XVIII, proved unpopular with the French public, and Charles was ultimately overthrown in a revolution in 1830. His successor, Louis Philippe I, opted not to have a coronation. The French government broke up and sold off most of the French Crown Jewels after 1875, in hopes of avoiding any further royalist agitation against the newly established French Third Republic.

== See also ==
- Coronation of the Holy Roman Emperor
- Coronation of the British monarch

== Bibliography ==
- Menin, Nicolas. A Description of the Coronation of the Kings and Queens of France, Printed for S. Hooper, 1775
- Jackson, Richard A. Ordines Coronationis Franciae : Texts and Ordines for the Coronation of Frankish and French Kings and Queens in the Middle Ages, Philadelphia, 1995–2000
