= French frigate Enjouée =

History

France
- Name: Enjouée
- Namesake: "Joyful"
- Ordered: 28 May 1766
- Builder: Le Havre
- Laid down: May 1766
- Launched: 4 November 1766
- In service: January 1768

General characteristics
- Type: Frigate
- Displacement: 1100 tonneaux
- Tons burthen: 600 port tonneaux
- Length: 42.2 m (138 ft) (overall)
- Beam: 11 m (36 ft)
- Draught: 5.1 m (17 ft)
- Propulsion: Sails
- Armament: 26 × 12-pounder long guns; 6 × 6-pounder long guns

Enjouée was an Infidèle-class 32-gun frigate of the French Navy, built on a design by Jean-Joseph Ginoux.

== Career ==
Enjouée was tasked with testing one of the first marine chronometers, by Pierre Le Roy, to ascertain whether it allowed measurements of longitude precise enough for navigation, after preliminary testing on Aurore. The test was successful and Le Roy was awarded a prize in recognition of his invention. (Note: Further testing took place with the 1768-1769 expedition of Fleurieu on Isis, and the 1771 voyage of Borda and Pingré on Flore.)

Enjouée was hulked at Brest in 1777 and broken up in 1783.
