= Pierre Ozanne =

French naval engineer (1737–1813)

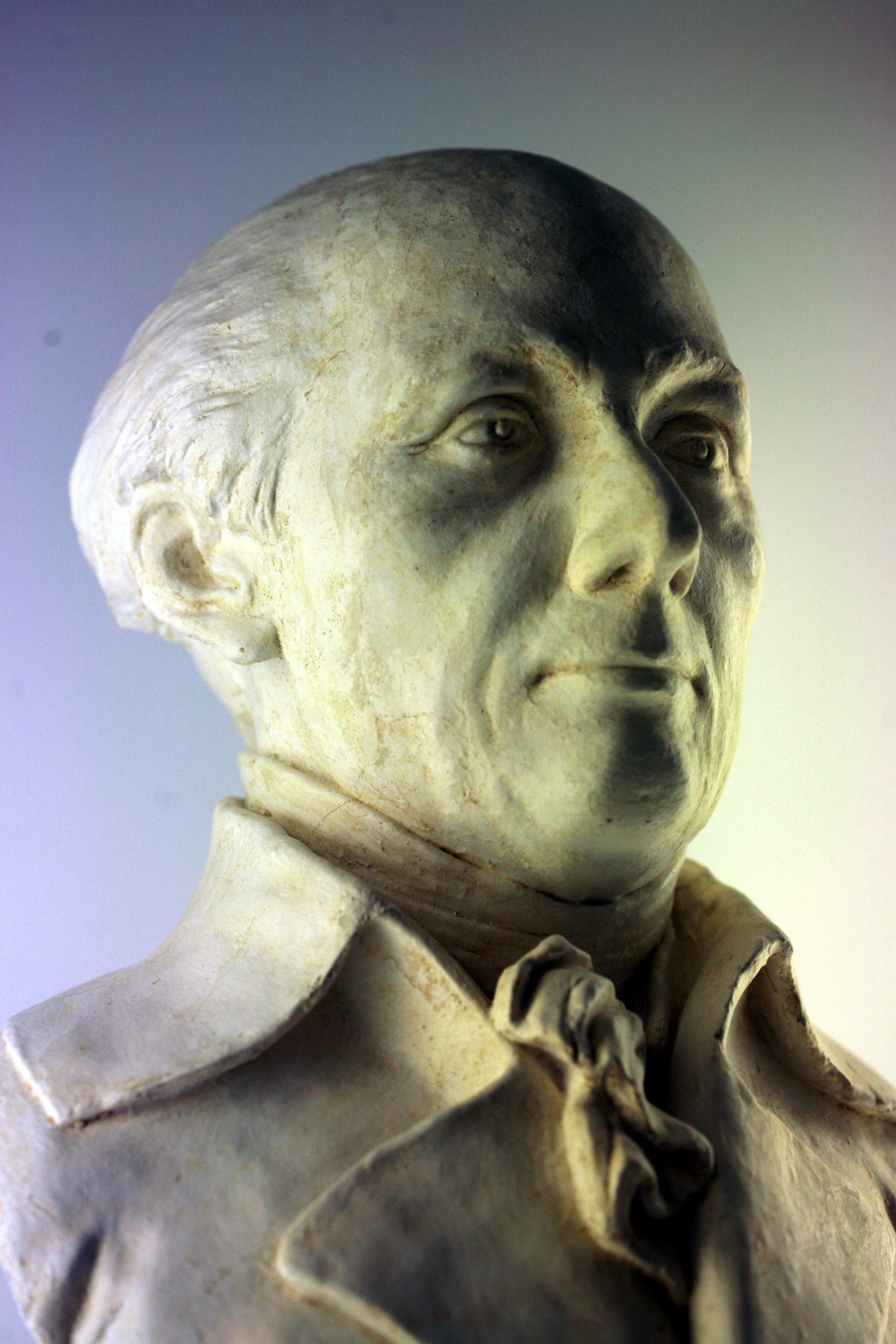
Bust of Pierre Ozanne, attributed to Etienne Collet (1761-1843). On display at Port-Louis naval museum.

Pierre Ozanne (3 December 1737 – 10 February 1813) was a French artist and engineer, brother of Nicolas Ozanne.

== Biography ==
From 1750, Ozanne was schooled at the Ecole des Gardes de la Marine, ancestor of the École Navale, and in Paris, where he was a pupil of Duhamel du Monceau. He returned to Brest in 1764 with a commission of drawing professor at the naval academy.

From 1771 to 1772, he took part in a scientific expedition on the frigate Flore, and in 1776, on the Boussole.

After the start of the American war of Independence, Ozanne served on Languedoc and on the Vautour.

In 1788, he directed the plans of the 74-gun Vengeur, earning a commission of naval engineer in the process.

Ozanne contributed to the propaganda of the Revolutionary era by commissioning two notable works: le Vengeur du Peuple au combat de prairial, in 1795, depicting the highly romanticised tale of the sinking of the French ship Vengeur du Peuple; and Le combat de la Bayonnaise, in 1798, depicting the capture of the 32-gun HMS Ambuscade by the 24-gun French corvette Bayonnaise.

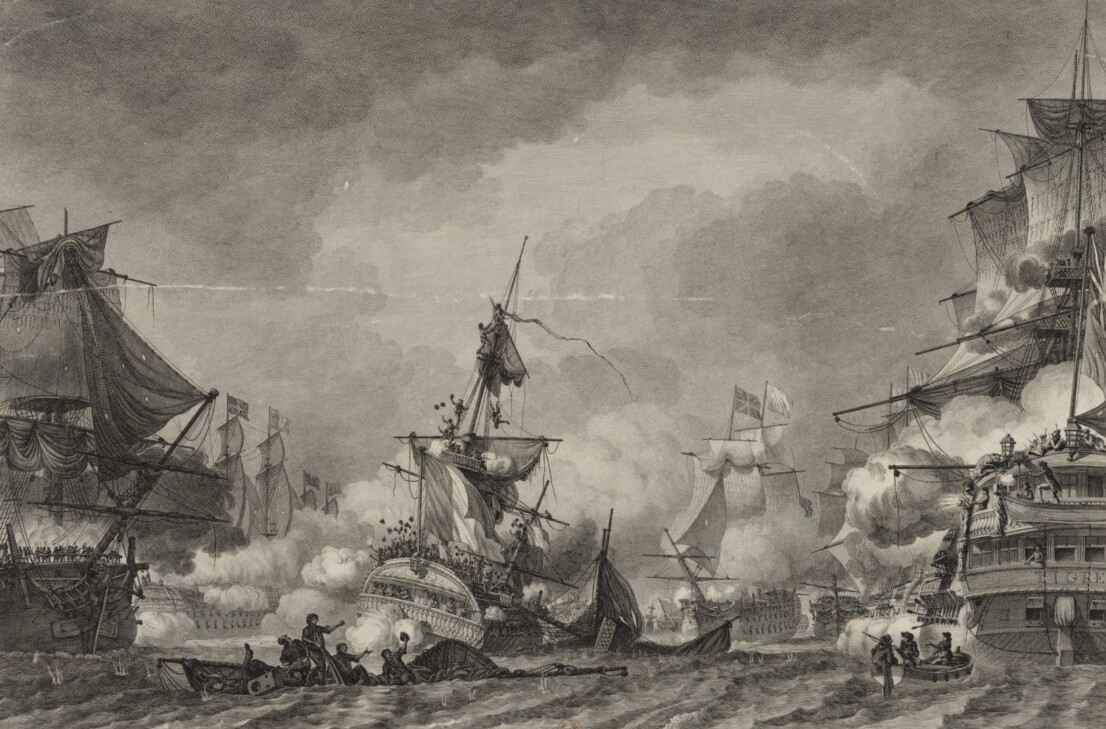
le Vengeur du Peuple au combat de prairial

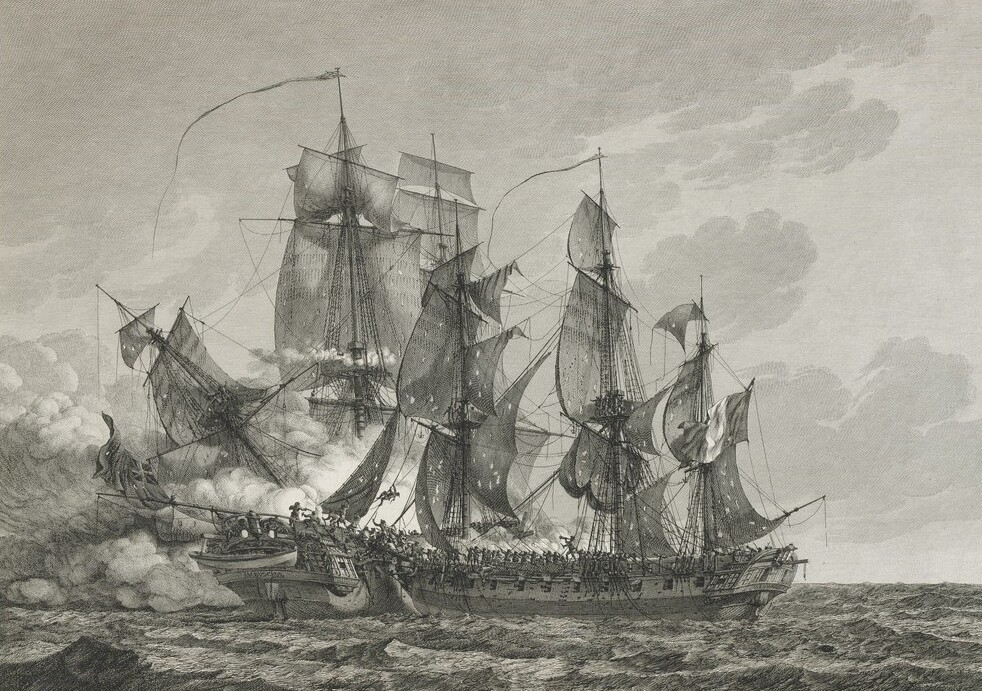
Le combat de la Bayonnaise

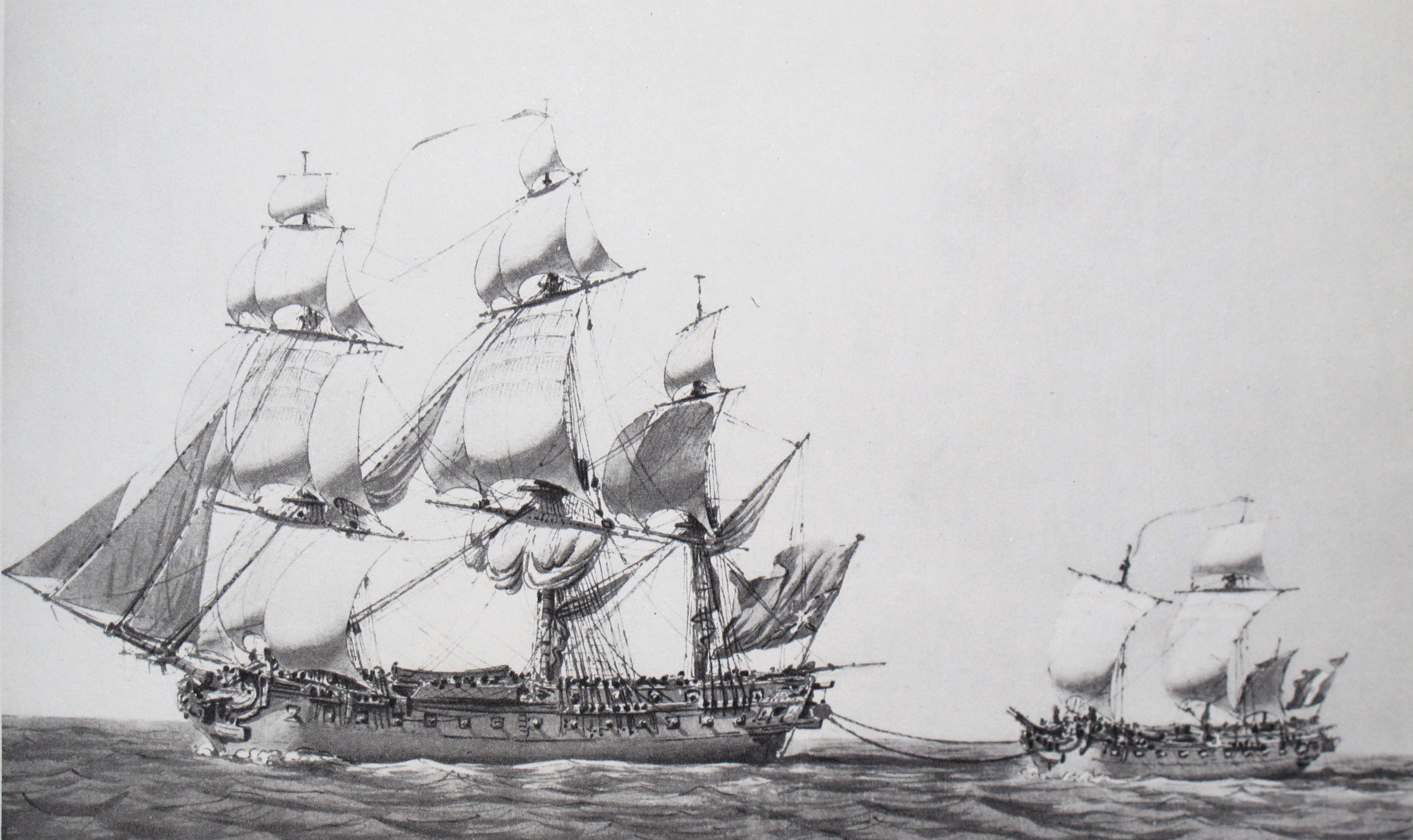
The captured Ambuscade towing Bayonnaise back to Rochefort. The proportions between the ships are grossly inaccurate.

In 1801, he was made a captaine de vaisseau. He was present at the Crown of Napoleon, representing naval engineering. Ozanne notably directed the construction of an enlarged version of the Téméraire class, the 86-gun Vétéran, that served as the personal ship of Napoleon's brother Jérôme.

Ozanne retired in 1811 in Brest.
