= Nicolas Ozanne =

French naval engineer and marine artist (1728–1811)

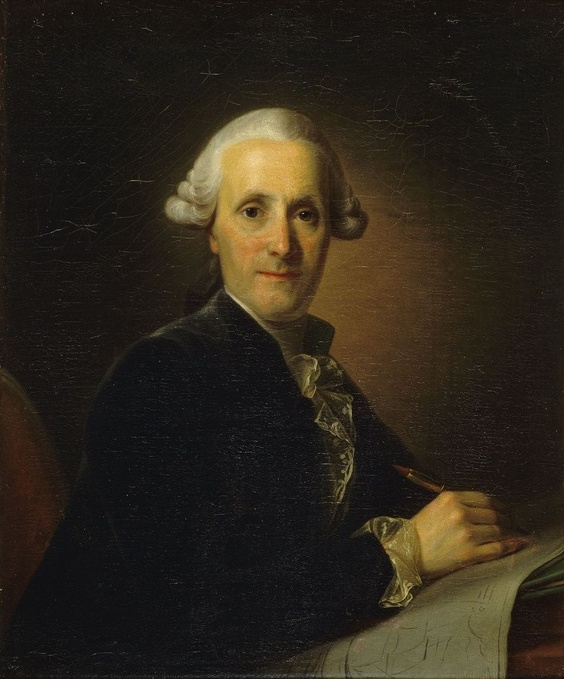
- Born: 12 January 1728
- Died: 3 January 1811 (aged 82); Paris
- Occupation: Painter, drawer, engineer, marine architect, printmaker
- Relatives: Jeanne Françoise Ozanne, Pierre Ozanne

Nicolas-Marie Ozanne (12 January 1728 – 5 January 1811) was a naval engineer and marine artist, author of a naval treatise and creator of a series of 60 views of the ports of France. His work witnesses to the French Navy of his time, particularly the Ponant (western) fleet.

== Life ==
Ozanne was born in Brest, France. His drawing skills were recognised at a very early age and aged only 10 he was given a place in the studio of Robelin, a drawing master in the gardes de la marine, becoming his assistant in 1742. There he was talent-spotted by Bigot de la Mothe, who had him draw plans for coastal gun batteries.

He was only 16 when his father died. Nicolas-Marie then took on his brothers and sisters to his care (Note: His sister, Jeanne-Françoise Ozanne, (10 October 1735, Brest – 20 February 1795, Paris), was an engraver – her works include Vues de Dieppe, de Saint- Valéry, de Livourne, des colonies françaises. His second sister, Marie-Jeanne Ozanne (12 February 1736, Brest – 16 February 1786, Paris), married the engraver Le Gouaz, whilst her own works include Vue de Livourne and Temps serein, after Vernet; the Ferme flamande and the Relais flamands, after Wouwerman. His brother, Pierre Ozanne (3 December 1737, Brest – 10 February 1813, Brest) was an engraver and marine engineer.) as engravers to give them a livelihood; his sister Marie-Élisabeth also took up pastels. He was then spotted by Duhamel du Monceau, who recommended him to Antoine Louis Rouillé – Ozanne then illustrated several works by Duhamel, with whom he was friends.

In 1750, Nicolas Ozanne succeeded Robelin as professor of drawing. In 1751, Rouillé employed him to produce ship designs then engravings of Louis XIV's trip to Havre in 1749. He was admitted as an assistant-member of the Académie de Marine and in 1757 made a naval artist at the Palace of Versailles. In 1762 he was given a role in the military geographers' department and at this time was also put in charge of educating the Dauphin's children in naval matters, contributing to the future Louis XVI's interest in the sea. In 1766, he designed the yacht Aurore for a scientific expedition led by Courtanvaux.

Ozanne retired in 1791, living in poverty until his death in Paris aged 82.

Examples of works by Ozanne
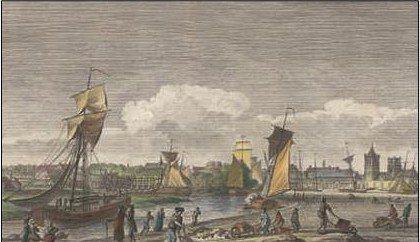
Le port de Caen vu de la Prairie by Nicolas Ozanne (1787)

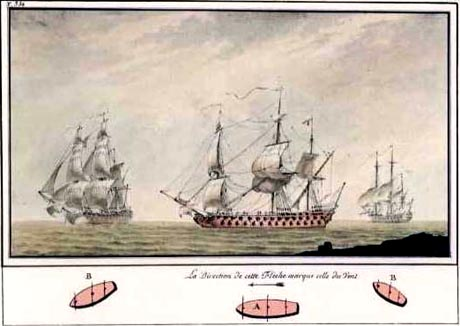
Vaisseau de 74 canons, by Nicolas Ozanne

== Bibliography ==
- Delacroix, Gérard (June 2000). Corvette l'Aurore, conçue par Nicolas Ozanne, réalisée par le constructeur Bonvoisin. Collection Archéologie navale française (in French). Éditions Ancre. ISBN 2-903179-23-9.
- (in French) Bruno de Dinechin, Duhamel du Monceau. Connaissance et mémoires européennes, 1999 ISBN 2-919911-11-2
- (in French) Une famille d'artistes brestois au XVIIIe siècle – Les Ozanne by Dr Charles Auffret, Hyacinthe Caillière éditeur, Rennes 1891.
- Biographie bretonne – Recueil de notices sur tous les Bretons qui se sont fait un nom Vol 2, by Prosper Levot, Cauderan éditeur, Vannes, 1857.
