= French corvette Aurore =

Aurore
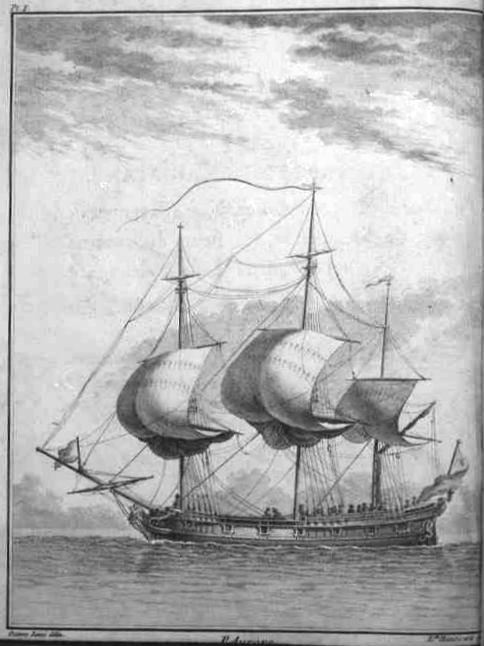
- Portrait of Aurore by Nicolas Ozanne (drawing) and Elisabeth Haussard (engraving)

History

France
- Name: Aurore; Petite Aurore
- Builder: Le Havre
- Laid down: 1766
- Launched: April 1767 or May 1767
- Renamed: Petite Aurore, 1768
- Stricken: 1775

General characteristics
- Class & type: corvette
- Displacement: 130 tons (French)
- Length: 21.6 metres (66'6" French feet) overall
- Beam: 5.9 metres (18'1" French feet)
- Depth of hold: 2.3 metres (8"2' French feet)
- Propulsion: Sails
- Complement: 30 to 40 men
- Armament: 6 × 2 or 3-pounder guns

Aurore was a corvette or snow, designed by Nicolas Ozanne. Built privately on the personal funds of François-César Le Tellier de Courtanvaux, she was commissioned by the French Navy and used for scientific purposes. She performed the first measurement of longitude using Marine chronometer.

== Background ==
During the 18th century, measure of longitude was performed by comparing the solar time of the ship with that of a know point, the difference in time being in relation with displacement on the globe. In practice, this was achieved by keeping the time of the latest point of departure by mean of hourglasses, and by tracking the moment the sun was seen at its zenith. However, hourglasses had a poor precision because they needed to be turned by hand at exact intervals, because sand tended aggregate due to humidity, and because its flow eroded the thin section of the bulb, accelerating the flow. Mechanical clocks were seen as the logical next step in technology, and in 1722, eight years after the British introduced Longitude rewards, the French Academy of Sciences started offering a prize every two year for the best chronometer for sea navigation.

In 1766, clockmaker Pierre Le Roy submitted a marine chronometer for consideration for the 1767 prize. At the time, several other clockmakers in France were trying to develop similar instruments, notably Ferdinand Berthoud, Étienne Tavernier and Jean Romilly, but being unfinished or damaged at the time, their prototypes could not contest. Finding Le Roy's invention promising, the Academy started studying ways to test it in real conditions at sea. Courtanvaux, who sat at the Academy, then proposed to shoulder the cost of the tests himself by having a ship built specially for the occasion.

Le Roy's chonometre
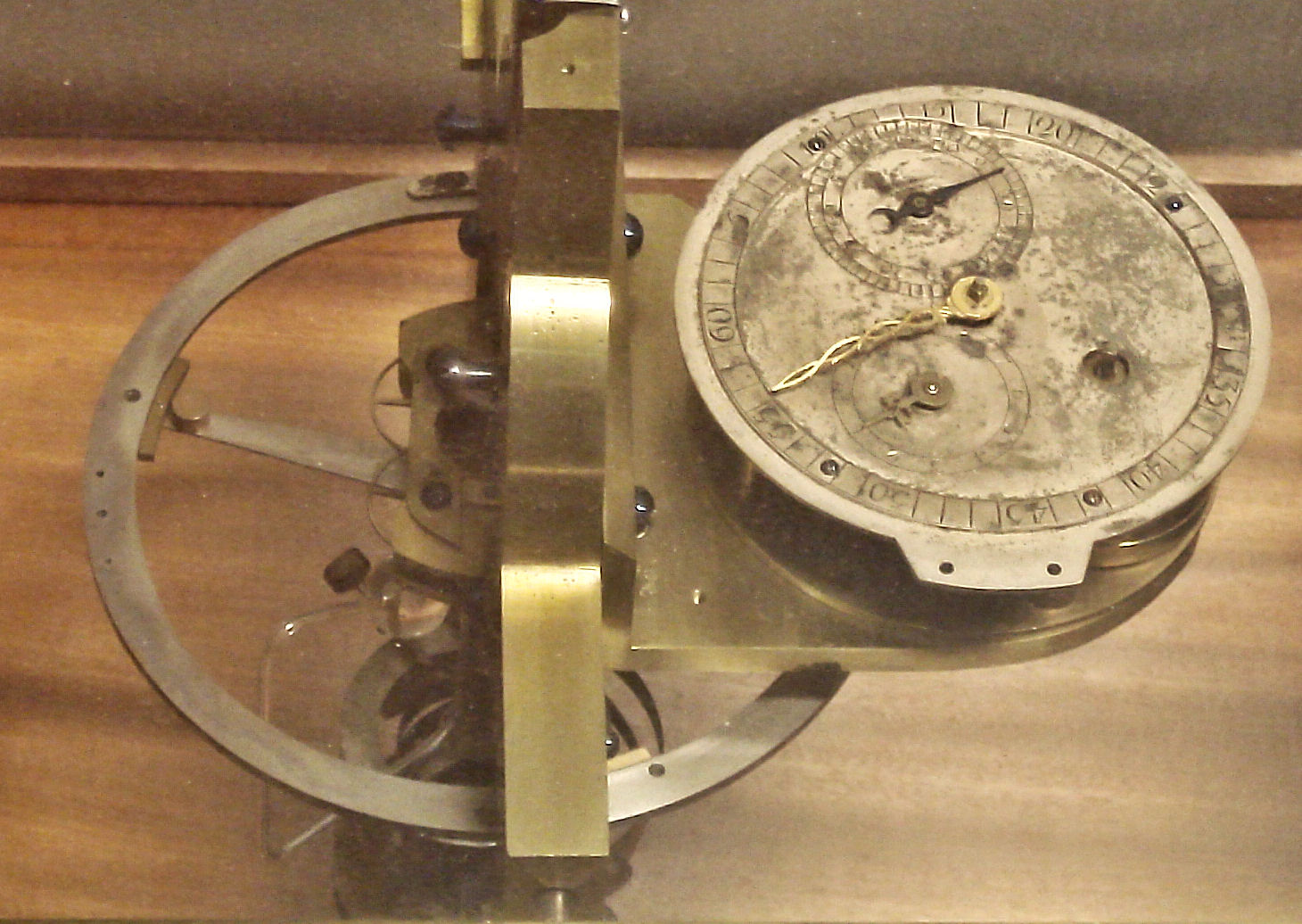
Le Roy's chonometre on display at CnAM

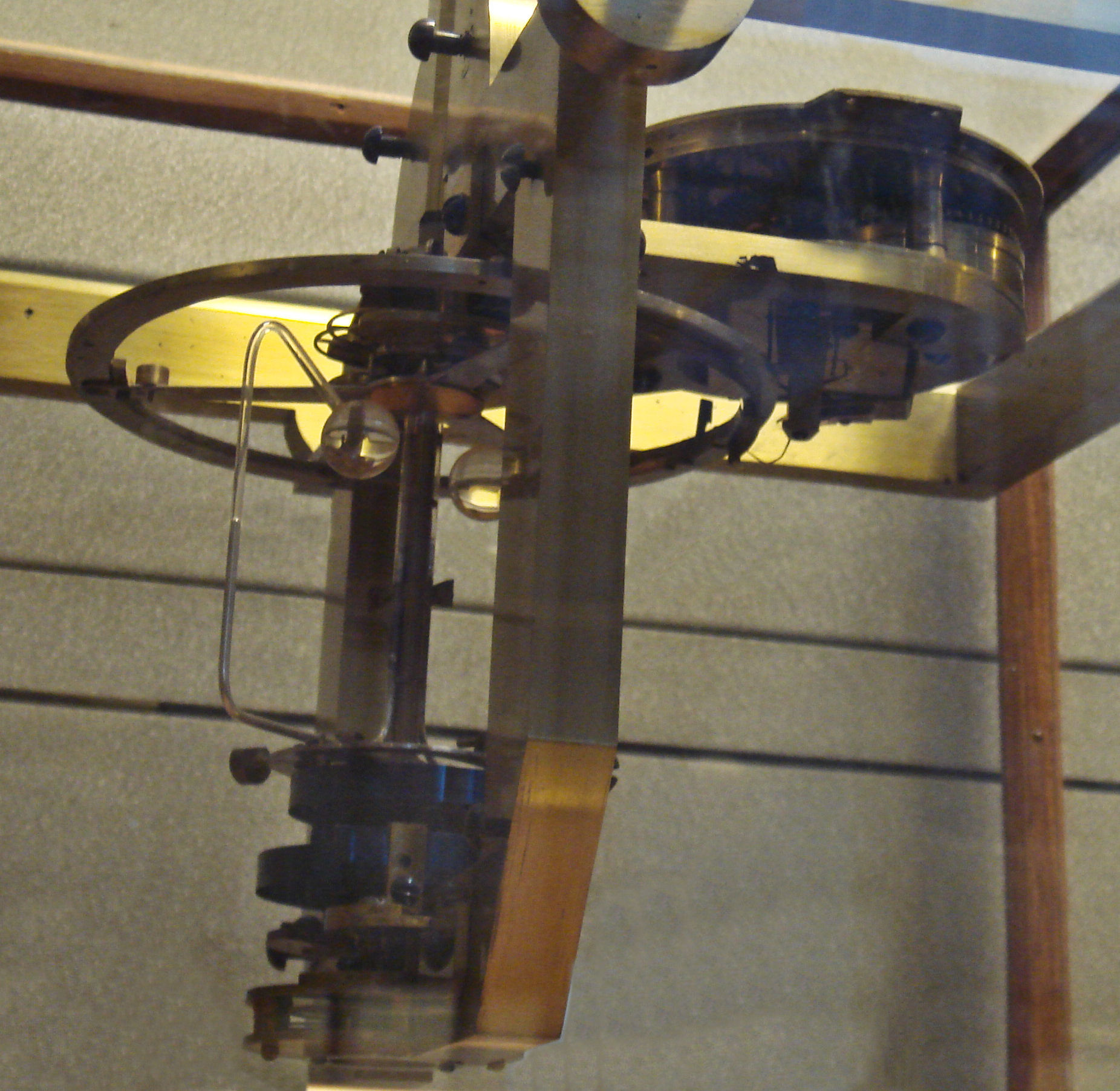
Mechanism of Le Roy's chonometre

The expedition was to depart Le Havre and cruise off the Northern coast of France, sailing to various harbours — Calais, Dunkirk, Rotterdam, Brielle and Amsterdam — before returning to Boulogne and Le Havre. A second journey was to be undertaken in 1768 to the South up to A Coruña. The frequent calls were to allow recalibrating the chronometer often, entailing that the ship had to be specially chartered for the purpose and be small and maneuverable enough to enter all the ports; this precluded use of a regular merchantman, which would in any case have been slow and whose accommodations would have been ill-suited to the purpose. Rather than re-amenaging a merchantman Courtanvaux decided to commission Nicolas Ozanne to design a corvette-sized yacht. Ozanne designed her as a pleasure craft, and the scientists involved in the expedition had quarters of an unusually high quality for the time.

Courtanvaux obtained official support for his endeavour, notably gaining recommendation letters from the Secretary of State for the Navy for his passage in the Netherlands, and obtaining the status of "royal frigate" — with special dispensation to fly the all-white royal ensign normally reserved for naval ships.

== Career ==
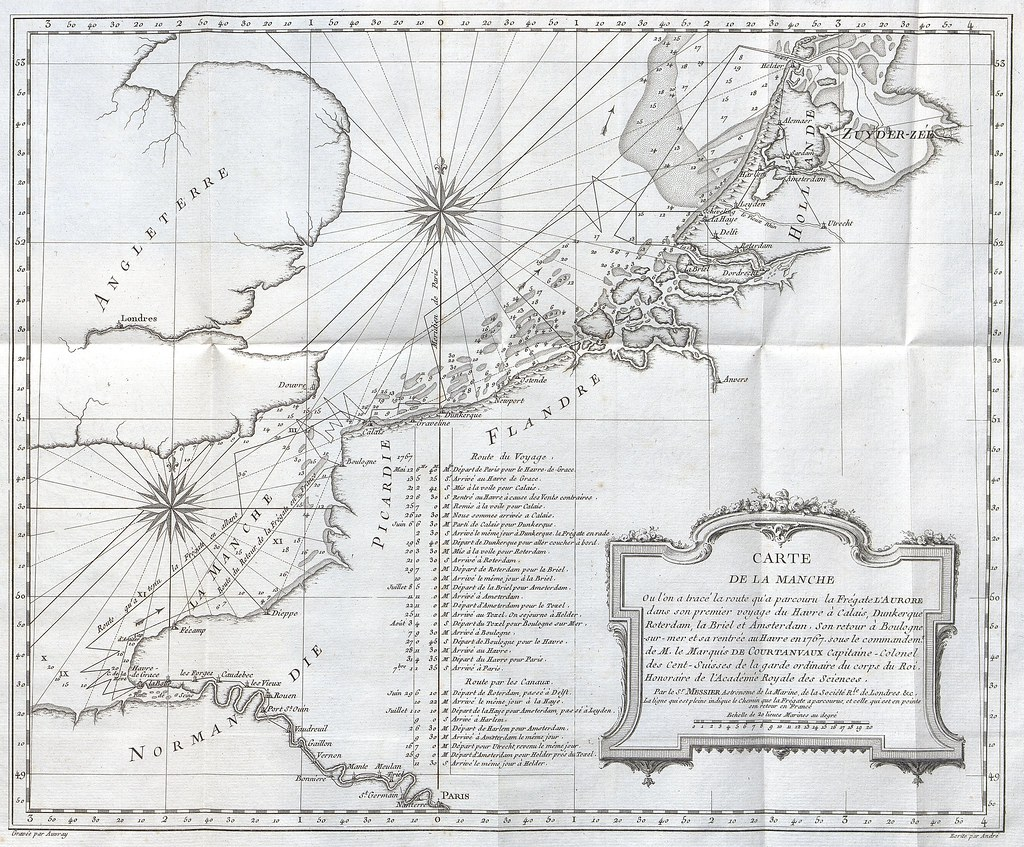
Map of the journey of Aurore in the Channel and in the North Sea.

On 19 April 1767, Mathieu Chopin was appointed captain of Aurore by a royal edict. In the morning of 14 May, Aurore put to sail for her first trials, watched by the numerous officials, the garrison and a large crowd. She was deemed a successful vessel, and in the next days her 24-man crew started training and getting accustomed to the ship, while the scientists started calibrating their instruments in a laboratory on the set up on the port. Along with his chronometer, Le Roy brought a second prototype, which he did not initially enter in the competition, as it had not been fully tested yet.

On 21 May, Aurore attempted the first leg of her journey, bound for Calais, but a gale forced her to return to Le Havre and wait several days for more clement weather. On 25 May, she departed again, reaching Calais the next morning through bad weather that left the passengers and the crew shaken. The weather taking another turn for the worse, Aurore remained in Calais for several days. On 6 June, in the early morning, she departed for Dunkirk, where she arrived in the late afternoon, threatened by yet another storm. On 13, the passengers were able to go ashore in a boat, enabling measurements to be made on the ground. Aurore departed Dunkirk on 20, and arrived in Rotterdam during the night. Again, the watches were sent ashore for precise measurements, and Courtanvaux left to visit the Netherland. Meanwhile, Aurore left Rotterdam on 29 June and sailed on the Meuse river to Brielle.

At Brielle, Le Roy stated that after testing, the second prototype seemed more reliable than the first, and he offered it to La Chapelle's consideration. Aurore was trapped by unfavourable winds that had prevented navigation for a week, and in the night of 6 July, she attempted to seize a passing opportunity to depart; however, a man went overboard, to be saved in the nick of time by a fellow sailor, then Aurore collided with a Dutch merchantman, and eventually the wind pushed her to the shore. She then aborted her attempt, and returned to port. She finally left on 8 July, arriving in Amsterdam on 11 after sustaining such bad weather that her guns would touch the water and that Le Roy measured a 25° list. At Amsterdam, she was rejoined by Courtanvaux, and the scientific staff went ashore again to test their instruments and take precise measurements.

On 22 July, Aurore departed Amsterdam, bound for Den Helder, while Courtanvaux pursued his touristic endeavours ashore. They met again at Texel on 25, where Aurore was again trapped by bad weather until 3 August. In the night of 4 August, she observed an aurora, and in the afternoon of 6 August, she arrived at Boulogne. In the evening, the scientists attempted to disembark on boats, but a sudden gale forced Aurore to return out at sea. She eventually entered Boulogne harbour the next day. Then, the scientists went ashore for another round of measurements and calibration. On 28 August, Aurore finally reached Le Havre.

In 1769, the French Royal Navy acquired Aurore.

== Fate ==
Aurore was struck in Brest in 1775.

== Legacy ==
After the journey, Courtanvaux wrote the story of the expedition. The narration was edited by Pingré and Messier, illustrated by Ozanne (with notably a representation of the launch of the frigate and a map of the journey), and published in 1768.

Le Roy's chronometer was found to have accumulated an error of 4 minutes and 52 seconds in the 52 days of the outbound journey, and 51 on the return leg. The second chronometer had an error of only 15 seconds and a half. It was tested again on a naval frigate, Enjouée, and in 1769 Le Roy was awarded the prize. Further testing of Le Roy's watches took place in 1771 and 1772 with the voyage of Borda and Pingré on Flore, where they tested his chronometers A and S, as well as Berthoud's n°8. Le Roy again won the 1773 double prize. The chronometer went on to be part of the collections of the Conservatoire national des arts et métiers, where it is on display.

A large scale model of Aurore is on display at Sainte-Geneviève Library. The model was made by former sailors of the expedition, and is built as a large 1/12th scale, yielding very minute details. A few pieces, such as boats and artillery pieces, have disappeared over time.

1/12th scale model on display at Sainte-Geneviève Library
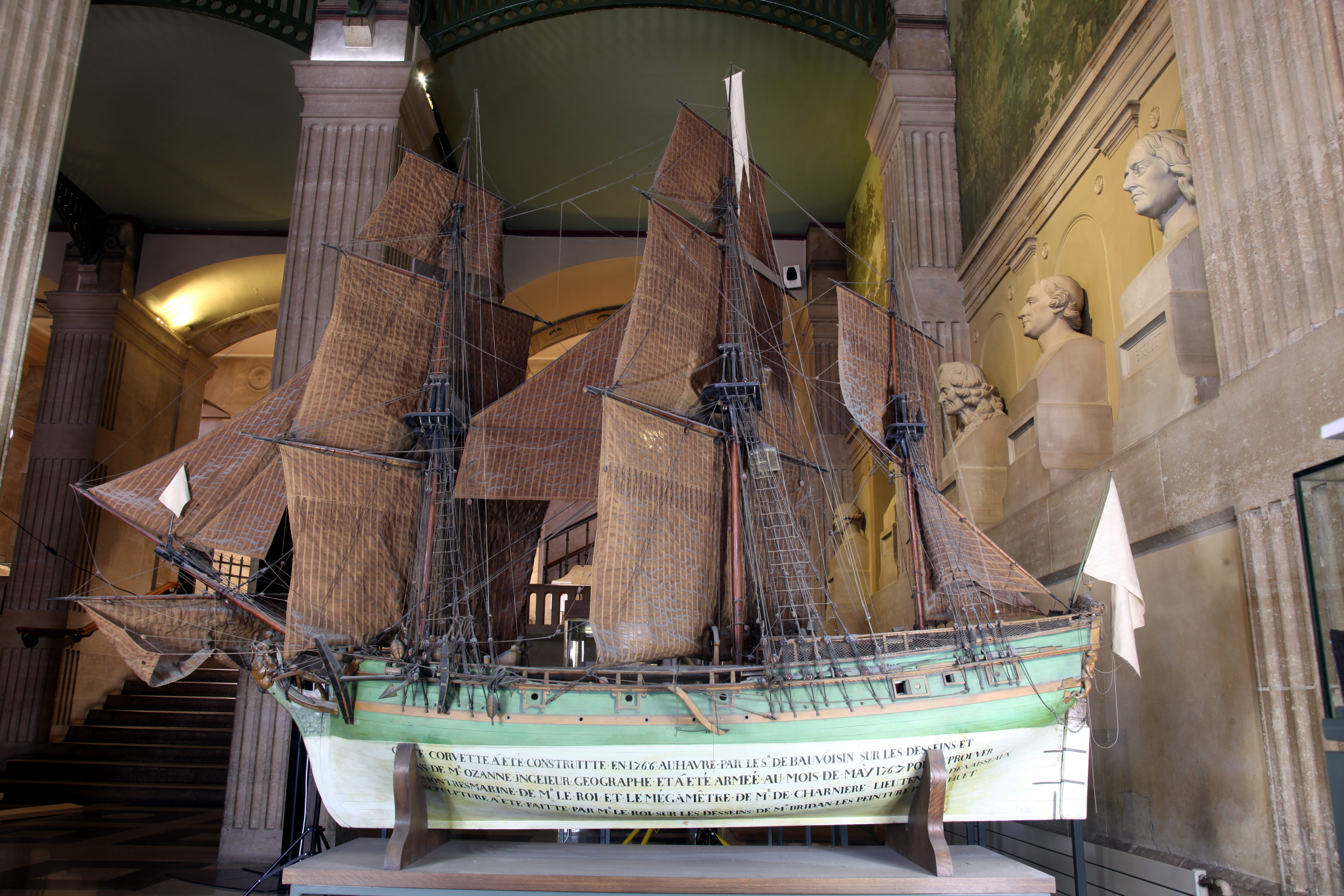
Portrait of the model

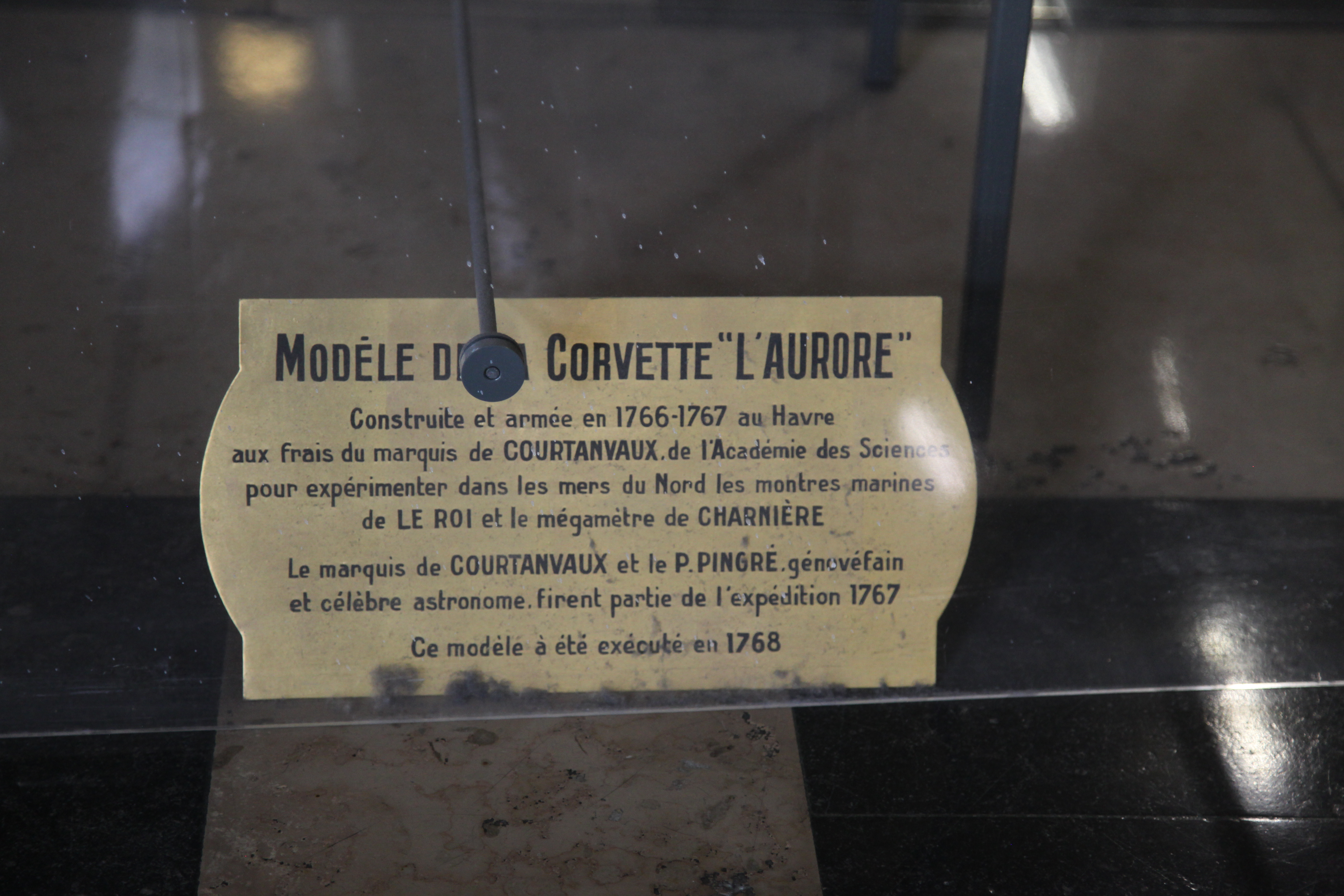
