= Congregation of France =

The Congregation of France (French: Labaye de Sainte Genevieve et la Congregation de France, lit. 'The Abbey of Sainte Genevieve and the Congregation of France') was a congregation of houses of canons regular in France. Its members were called Génovéfains after the Abbey of St Genevieve, the motherhouse of the congregation.

== History ==
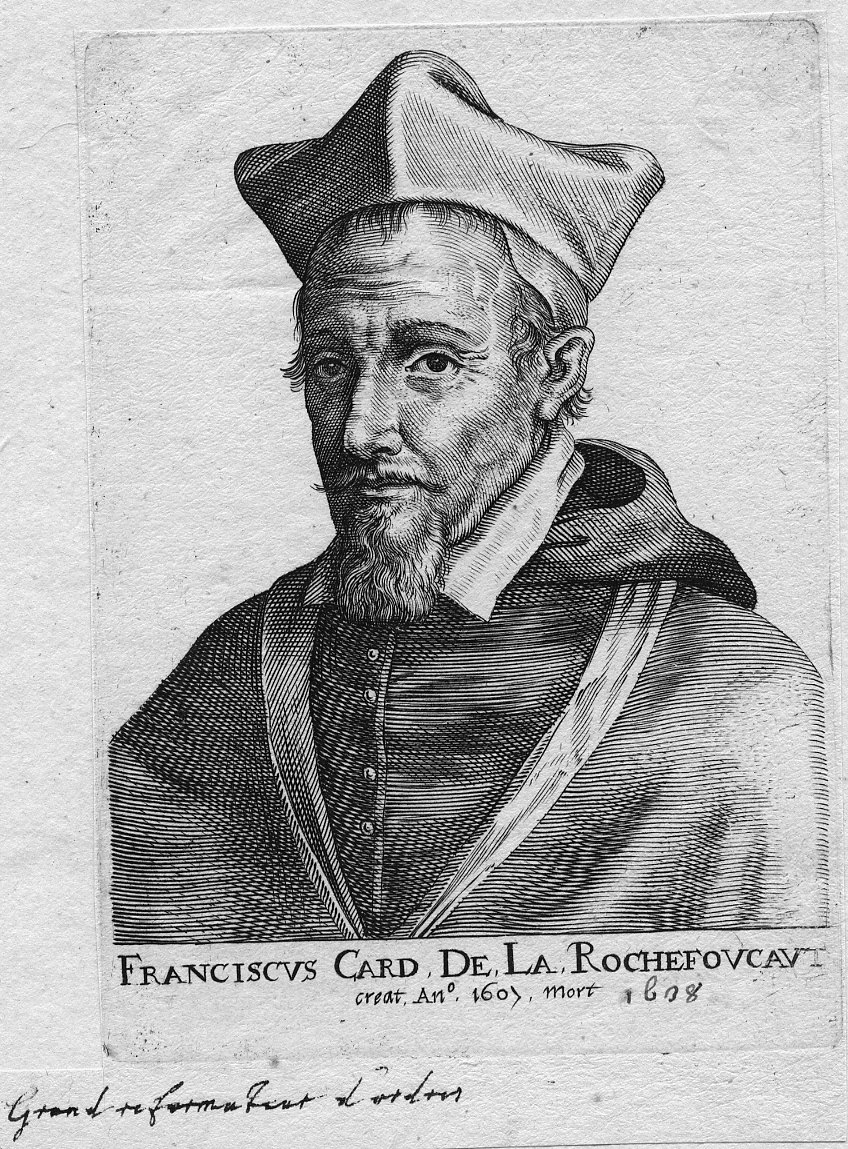
Cardinal François de La Rochefoucauld

The congregation was founded by Cardinal de La Rochefoucauld, commendatory abbot of St Genevieve at the behest of Louis XIII to reform the monastic communities in France, starting with those closest to Paris. In April 1622 La Rochefoucauld was named papal commissioner for the reform of the old religious orders in France. He called Charles Faure from the Abbey of St. Vincent in Senlis, where Faure had already initiated the formal observance of the Rule of St. Augustine. Faure was elected Prior General of the new congregation, a position he held until his death in 1644. Although the motherhouse was St. Genevieve, the congregation held its General Chapter at St. Vincent every three years, to honor its role in the reform of the canonical life in France.

The religious habit that they wore were white, covered by a linen rochet, and a black cloak for outside the abbey. The administration of parishes was an essential part of the Genovéfains' work. One of the earliest to come under their care was Saint-Étienne-du-Mont, adjacent to St. Genevieve. In 1683 the parish church of Saint-Medard in the Faubourg Saint-Marcel was placed under the jurisdiction of the abbot of the nearby abbey.

The antiquary Richard Augustine Hay became a canon at St. Genevieve in 1678. Astronomer and naval geographer, Alexandre Guy Pingré was made librarian of St. Geneviève and built an observatory at the Abbey. Around 1740, Louis, Duke of Orléans decided to retire to the Abbey of St Genevieve. From then on, he became known as Louis le Génovéfain.

By the eighteenth century the order had 107 monasteries and over 1300 canons, who primarily cared for the sick in their hospitals and almshouses. The congregation was suppressed during the French Revolution. In 1744 King Louis XV vowed that if he recovered from his illness he would replace the dilapidated abbey church of St Genevieve with a building worthy of the patron saint of Paris. Work proceeded slowly and the re-modelled abbey church of St. Genevieve was finally completed in 1790, shortly after the beginning of the French Revolution, when it became the Panthéon. The abbey later became the Lycée Henri-IV.

== Sources ==
- Pierre Féret (1883): L'Abbaye de Sainte-Geneviève et la Congrégation de France: précédées de la vie de la patronne de Paris, d'après des documents inédits
