= Crown of Charlemagne =

Coronation crown of Kings of the Franks and later Kings of France after 1237

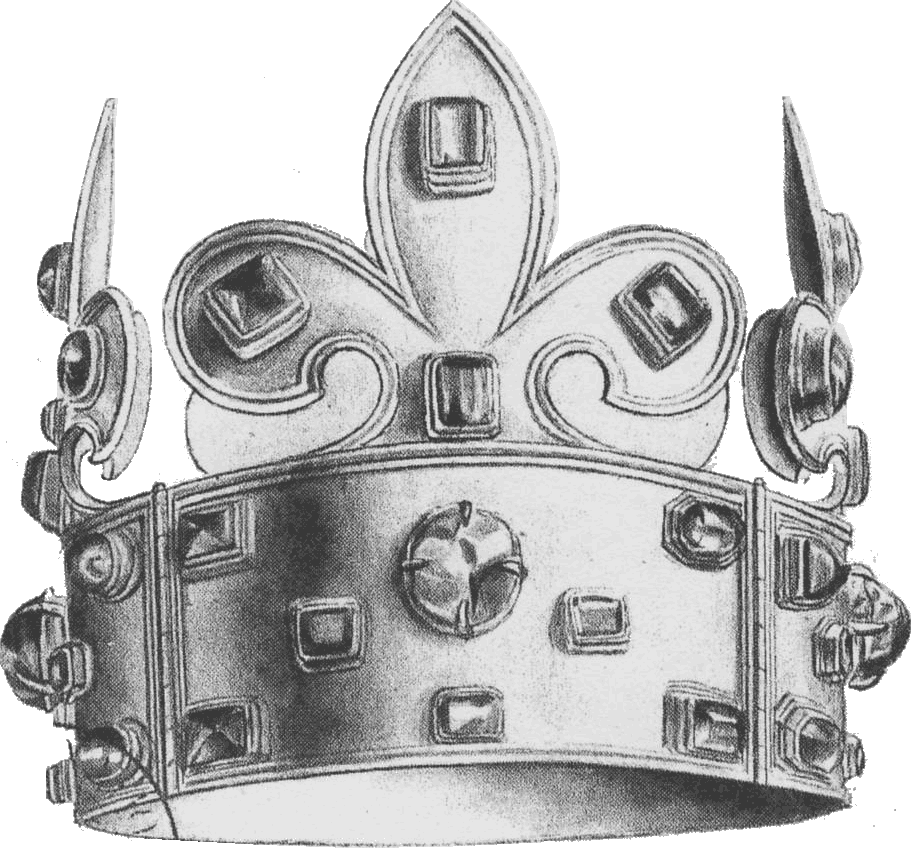
The Crown of Charlemagne from 1271.

The Crown of Charlemagne (French: Couronne de Charlemagne) was a name given to the ancient coronation crown of Kings of the Franks, and later Kings of France after 1237.

It was probably created as a simple circlet of four curved rectangular jewelled plates for Charles the Bald, the grandson of Charlemagne, but later, four large jewelled fleur-de-lis were added to these four original plates, probably by Philip Augustus around 1180, and surmounted by a cap decorated with precious stones. At this time, a similar but open crown, that of the queen, also existed. One of them was melted down in 1590 by the Catholic League during the siege of Paris. The remaining crown was used up to the reign of King Louis XVI, who was crowned in 1775 in the Reims Cathedral. The crown of Joan of Évreux was then used for the coronation of the queens.

French kings had also their personal crowns, worn after the coronation, during the banquet held at the Palace of Tau, like the crown of Saint Louis called the Sainte Couronne de France, Henry IV or Louis XIV which were later donated to the treasury of the Basilica of Saint-Denis near Paris, the traditional burial place of the Capetian dynasty.

Only one of the 11 personal crowns of the Ancien Régime remains, the Crown of Louis XV, manufactured for the coronation of Louis XV in 1722, and 5 crowns from the 19th century. The coronation crown, the Crown of Charlemagne, was destroyed in the French Revolution, like some of the regalia. From the Ancien Régime regalia, except for Louis XV's crown, the Throne of Dagobert, the medieval coronation sword of the French kings Joyeuse, the spurs, the brooch said to have belonged to Saint Louis, the ivory sceptre, called the Hand of Justice, the sceptre of Charles V, as well as the antique cup of the Ptolemies (or the coronation chalice) with its paten kept in Reims survived.

The Imperial Crown of the Holy Roman Empire or Reichskrone, probably made for the coronation of Otto the Great in 962 at the workshops of the imperial monastery of Reichenau, was also later identified as the Crown of Charlemagne and as such appeared on the escutcheon of the Arch-Treasurer of the Holy Roman Empire and at the top of the coat of arms of the Habsburg emperors, e.g. at the Hofburg Palace in Vienna.

When Napoleon proclaimed himself Emperor of the French, he also called his own imperial crown the "Crown of Charlemagne".
