= French frigate Flore (1768) =

32-gun frigate of the French Navy

History

France
- Name: Flore
- Namesake: Flora
- Ordered: 9 November 1767
- Builder: Brest
- Laid down: February 1768
- Launched: 11 November 1768
- Fate: Sold at Toulon in 1787

General characteristics
- Displacement: 950 tonneaux
- Tons burthen: 540 port tonneaux
- Length: 40.9 metres
- Beam: 10.6 metres
- Draught: 5 metres
- Propulsion: Sail
- Armament: 32 guns: 26 × 12-pounders; 6 × 6-pounders

Flore was a 32-gun frigate of the French Navy, designed by Groignard. She is notable for her scientific voyage in 1771 and 1772, where she tested marine chronometers made by Berthoud, an important step in the History of longitude.

== Career ==
On 29 October 1771, under Lieutenant Verdun de la Crenne, Flore departed Brest for a scientific voyage intended to test several Marine chronometers: (Note: The voyage followed the inconclusive 1767 expedition of Courtanvaux on Aurore, the 1768 expedition of Cassini on Enjouée, and the 1768-1769 expedition of Fleurieu on Isis.) Berthoud's n°8, Le Roy's watches A and S, and another called "petite ronde" which was not competing for the 1773 prize, as well as further chronometers by Arsandeaux and Biesta. Borda and Pingré were part of the expedition. Flore called Cadiz and Tenerriffe, before continuing on to Gorée, Fort Royal, Cap français, Saint-Pierre et Miquelon, and Copenhagen, before returning to Brest.

Flore took part in the War of American Independence under Castellane-Majastre, ferrying letters between Toulon and America in April 1778.

On 22 October 1781, Flore departed Toulon to take part in the Invasion of Minorca. She returned on 30 November.

== Fate ==
Flore was condemned at Toulon, and sold in 1787.
