= Abbey of St. Vincent, Senlis =

Former monastery in Senlis, Oise

Coordinates: 49°12′09″N 2°35′22″E

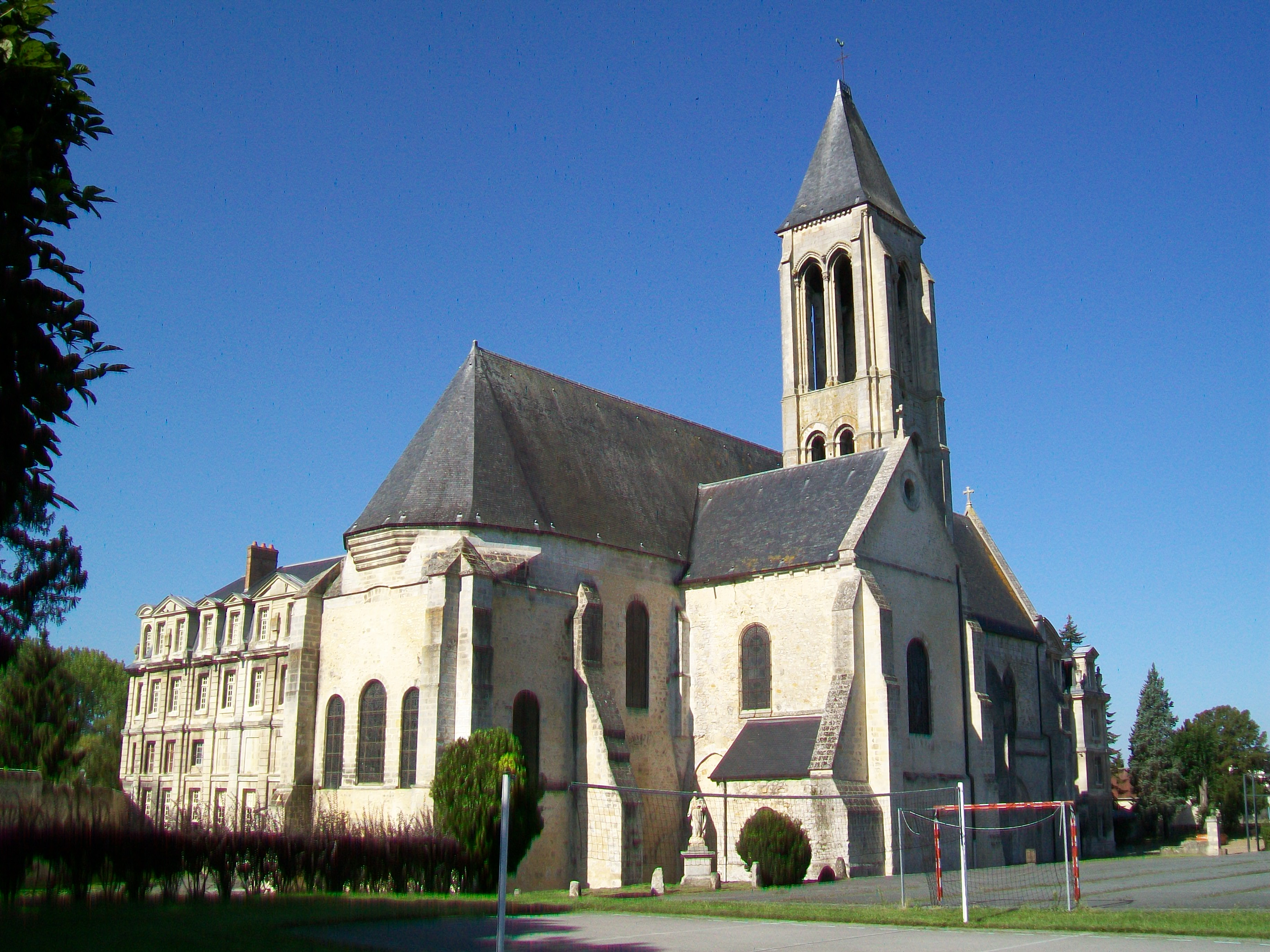
Former abbey church

The Abbey of St. Vincent, otherwise the Royal Abbey of St. Vincent (French: Abbaye Saint-Vincent de Senlis), was a former monastery of canons regular in Senlis, Oise, which was dissolved during the French Revolution. Late in their history, they became part of a new congregation of canons regular with the motherhouse at the Royal Abbey of St Genevieve in Paris, known as the Genofévains, widely respected for their institutions of learning.

== Foundations ==
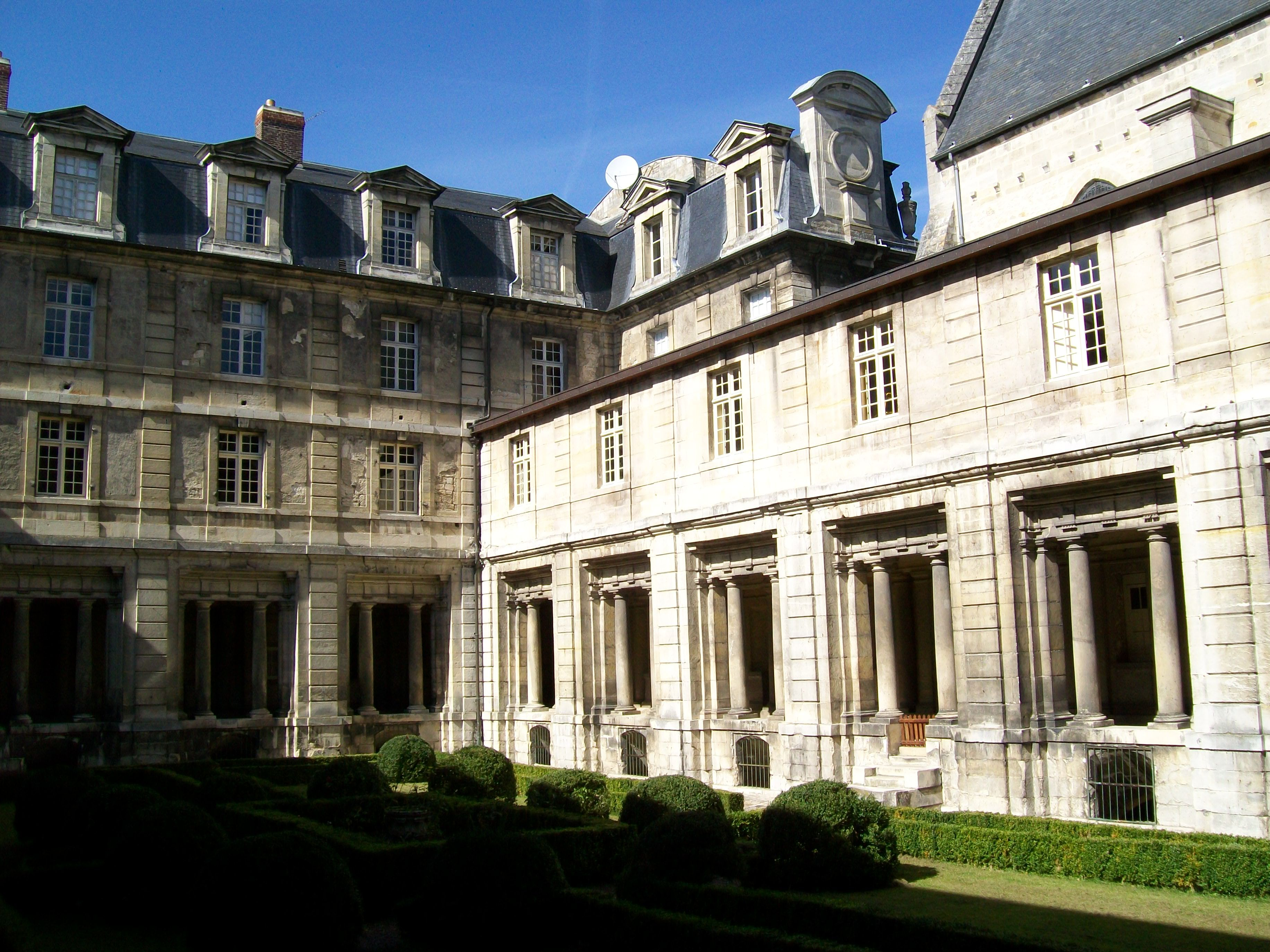
abbaye St-Vincent, cloître

The abbey was founded in 1065 by Queen Anne of Kiev, the widow of King Henry I of France, possibly built on the ruins of an ancient chapel dedicated to St. John the Baptist which had been destroyed in the course of invasion by the Normans in the late 900s. She did this to fulfill a vow she had made as a young bride some fifteen years earlier to found a monastery if God were to bless her marriage. By that time, however, she had met the man who became her third husband, the Norman lord Ralph IV of Valois, which resulted in their excommunication. Nevertheless, the monastery church was solemnly dedicated on 29 October 1065, under the patronage of the Holy Trinity, the Blessed Virgin Mary, St. John the Baptist and St. Vincent of Saragossa. Her son, King Philip I of France, later declared it to be a royal abbey, independent of all authorities, both ecclesiastical or civil, and made a number of grants of land to the community.

== Growth ==
After its founding, the queen then took up residence at the abbey. At that time of her second husband's death in 1074 she asked her son to assume the patronage of the abbey, which he did, granting further lands to the community. He, in turn, left it to his son, King Louis VI. Louis, however, did not have the concern about the community of his father and grandmother. Cluny Abbey had its eyes on St. Vincent and its properties, and attempted to gain control of it, as it had done with the Priory of Saint-Martin-des-Champs in Paris. The three chapters of canons in Senlis joined forces to resist this step and finally gained the support of the king. To strengthen their financial situation, he restored various lands of the abbey which had been seized by local lords. Pope Callistus III gave his official support to the canons, though he urged them to return to their original zeal in their following of the Rule of St. Augustine in their daily lives. Thus the abbey began the 12th century with a new sense of vigor.

About that time, Abbot Baudouin established a school for boys in the abbey, which appears in documents dated 1124. After his death, in order to assure their continued success, the canons of Senlis decided to affiliate with the Royal Abbey of St. Victor in Paris, which had quickly become an esteemed center of learning in France. To seal this bond, they chose their new abbot from among the canons in Paris. The king gave formal approval of this affiliation in 1138 but guaranteed the complete autonomy of the community at Senlis, which thereby became a part of the Congregation of St. Victor. This group of monasteries were so favored by the royal family that, upon his death in 1226, King Louis VIII of France left 4,000 pounds in his will to each of the forty houses then belonging to the congregation.

During this period, the abbey maintained an excellent reputation for the virtue of its canons. They abbey maintained a policy of allowing donors to continue to benefit from their gifts until their deaths. They allowed them the option of living at the abbey as auxiliary canons, to benefit from the conventual life. They also accepted women as laysisters, and always accorded the queens of France open hospitality.

This led to a marked expansion of the number of the community. During the 12th and 13th centuries, eight conventual priories were founded throughout a large region of northern France. Most were connected to parishes for which the abbey had assumed the spiritual care.

During this period, the abbey went to great efforts to maintain its independence from the local authorities, including the Bishop of Senlis, in whose diocese they were situated. In line with this, beginning in 1277 the abbot would assign the bishop to help at the meals any time he chose to dine at the abbey, to indicate that the bishop was not doing so through any privilege or right due to his office. They went so far as to have their seminarians ordained by bishops of other dioceses. This practice led to a formal complaint by the bishop to the Holy See, which eventually upheld the right of the abbey. To maintain peace, the abbey eventually ceded some of their legal rights to the local townsfolk.

== Decline and revival ==
After the death of Abbot Nicolas Foulon in 1491, the Parliament of Paris took advantage of a number of contested elections of his successors, through which they were able to establish commendatory abbots over the abbey, thereby seizing control of their revenues. This became official in 1536. As a consequence, by the end of the century, community life among the canons had deteriorated to such a degree that few of them resided in the abbey and there was consideration of giving it to the newly founded Capuchin Franciscan friars.

This decline was eventually halted through the presence of a young novice, Charles Faure, who had entered the community at the age of 19. He had become disgusted at the laxity of the canons and began to question his admission to the Order. On the point of leaving, he was persuaded by two young canons who shared his point of view to stay and to guide them how to live the life they had all envisioned when they entered the abbey. Others in the community came to join their endeavor. They experienced, however, the resistance of the prior of the community, who feared driving off potential candidates through fear of the rigorous life these men proposed reviving.

The matter was brought to the attention of the Bishop of Senlis, at that time, Cardinal François de La Rochefoucauld, who was also commendatory abbot of the community. He encouraged Faure and his companions in this effort. Faure was professed as a canon of the abbey in 1615. The three young canons then went to different houses to undertake their studies for ordination. The prior, supported by the bulk of the community, opposed their projected reform and went so far as to cut off the financial support due them as members of the community. Terrible rumors were also put out about their moral character. Faure was forced to return to Senlis, where he attempted to put the finances of the abbey back into order.

On 30 July 1618, the community met in chapter and elected one of the two young supporters of Faure as the new prior. With this the abbey resumed a formal observance of the Rule of St. Augustine. Faure was ordained at the end of that year.

This renewed observance was met with suspicion both within and outside of the abbey. The following year, a young member of the community was so overwhelmed by the demands of the life that he attempted to escape over the walls of the abbey, from which he fell, badly injuring himself. The townspeople were incensed and charged the abbey, subjecting the canons to insults and threats. The cardinal stepped in at this point and undertook an investigation of the matter. Not only did he find in favor of the canonical community, but he took the occasion to praise the new-found spiritual life of the abbey. In fact, he recommended that the canons of St. Genevieve in Paris, whose commendatory abbot he also was, spend time in Senlis to learn from them. As a result, any commendatory abbots who truly were interested in promoting the spiritual lives of the houses which belonged to them began to look to St. Vincent as a model for reform.

In 1622, the cardinal received a mandate from both King Louis XIII and Pope Gregory XV to undertake the reform of the religious communities of France. He enlisted the support of Faure and called a convocation of religious leaders at the Abbey of St. Genevieve in Paris. The decision was made to begin the reform with the forty monasteries closest to Paris, with the motherhouse to be at St. Genevieve. Through this decision the Congregation of France was formed, whose members became known as Genofévains, after the motherhouse.

To implement this reform, the community of St. Vincent elected Faure as Prior General of the new congregation on 12 October 1623. Canons of that house were then to be established as superiors in all the other houses, beginning with St. Genevieve. On 10 August 1628 the first General Chapter of the new congregation was held at St. Vincent. The resolutions proposed at this gathering were generally accepted unanimously. Faure then attempted to resign his position in the congregation, a request which was refused by the chapter. He then continued in this office until his death in 1652. After his death, the congregation voted to continue holding its General Chapter at St. Vincent every three years, to honor its role in the reform of the canonical life in France.

One notable graduate of the college run at the abbey and later member of the community was Dom Alexandre Guy Pingré, C.R.S.A. (died 1796). He made significant contributions to astronomy and naval cartography.

== Dissolution ==
The commendatory abbots continued to care for the abbey throughout the rest of its history. They made improvements in the walls and buildings until the mid-18th century. The coming of the French Revolution put an end to its life. In 1791, the canons were assembled and ordered to vacate the abbey, in compliance with the suppression of all religious houses under the new laws of the Republic.

The buildings were seized by the revolutionary government and used in various ways, as a military hospital, a barracks, and a prison for prisoners of war. In 1804, the complex was rented to a manufacturer for a spinning mill. By 1835 they had fallen into the hands of a developer who had slated the walls and building for demolition. The following year, three canons of Beauvais were able to raise the funds to purchase the property. They then opened a school for boys.
