= Charles François César Le Tellier, Marquis of Montmirail =

Charles François César Le Tellier
- Marquis of Montmirail
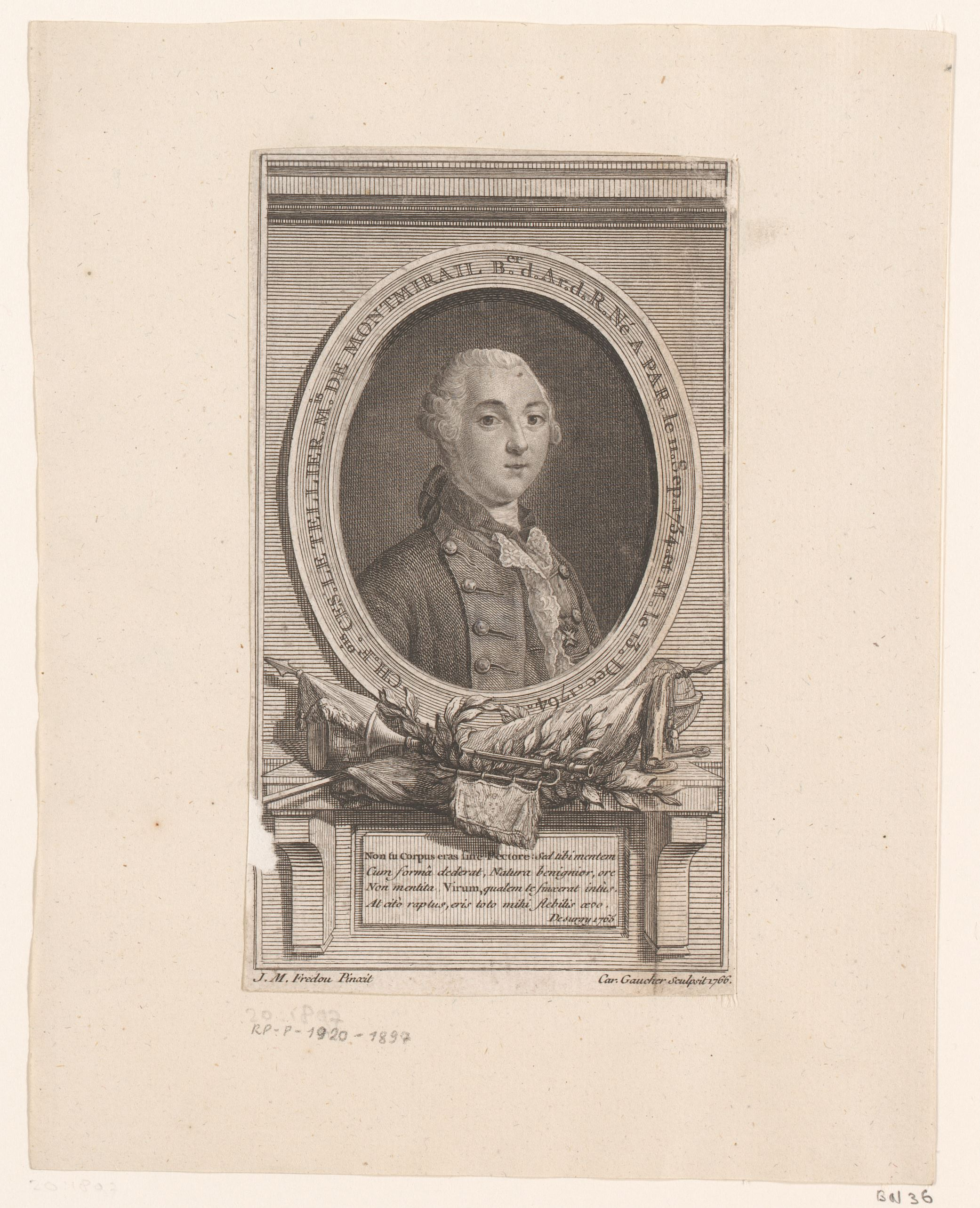
- Portrait by Charles-Étienne Gaucher, after a painting by Jean-Martial Frédou (1766)
- Born: 1734; Paris
- Died: 1764 (aged 30); Paris
- Father: François César Le Tellier de Courtanvaux

Charles François César Le Tellier, Marquis of Montmirail (Paris, 11 or 12 September 1734 – Paris, 13 December 1764) was a French military officer, member of the French Royal Academy of Sciences.

== Biography ==
Charles-François-César Le Tellier was born to François César Le Tellier de Courtanvaux. First bearing the title of Marquis of Crusy, he took the title of Marquis of Montmirail from his father when he himself took the title of Marquis of Courtanvaux when Charles-François-César's grandfather died.

He studied at the Jesuit college Louis-le-Grand in Paris, showing interest in physics and natural sciences. He also studied humanities and philosophy under Père de Merville, professor of Mathematics at the Collège des Jésuites.

At 17, he joined the First Musketeer Company.

After three years of service in the Musketeers of the Guard, the King granted him the position of Captain-Colonel of the Hundred Swiss, his father resigning in his favour. He was commissioned on 28 November 1754 and, the next day, promoted to Colonel, so as to be able to serve in the Army when the Swiss could not, as they were obliged to always stay with the King himself.

In 1757, Montmirail's uncle Marshal d'Estrées joined the Army and Montmirail was appointed his aide-de-camp. He took part in the Battle of Hastenbeck in July 1757.
