= Gérard Delacroix =

French naval archaeologist (born 1956)

- Born: 10 April 1956 (age 69)
- Occupation: Naval archaeologist
- Website: www.gerard-delacroix.fr

Gérard Delacroix (born 10 April 1956) is a French naval archaeologist, author and editor, specialised in maritime subjects of the 17th and 18th centuries. He has authored several monographs and articles.

== Biography ==
Born to a family from Rochefort-sur-Mer with a maritime tradition, Gérard Delacroix grew an early interest in ships. In the 1980s, he started building ship models and from there went on to study archives of the 18th century about naval construction.

After meeting Jean Boudriot, he published his first monograph in 1995, Le Fleuron (1729), about a 64-gun ship of the early 18th century. He went on to write about the 118-gun Commerce de Marseille (1788), as well as about galleys with La Fleur de Lis (1690).

He also worked on more common ships such as Mediterranean tartanes, with La Diligente (1738), or the exploration ship of Kerguelen, le Gros-Ventre (1766).

Gérard Delacroix is a Chevalier in the Ordre du Mérite Maritime

== Notes and references ==
=== Publications ===
- Le Fleuron, vaisseau de 64 canons -1729-, ANCRE, 1995, ISBN 2-906381-20-9
- La Diligente, tartane à deux arbres -1738-, ANCRE, 1997, ISBN 2-903179-21-2
- La chaloupe armée en guerre -1834-, ANCRE, 1997, ISBN 2-906381-24-1
- L'Aurore, corvette d'agrément -1766-, ANCRE 2000 ISBN 2-903179-23-9
- Le Gros Ventre, gabare -1766-, ANCRE 2003 ISBN 2-903179-34-4
- Le Commerce de Marseille, vaisseau de 118 canons -1788-, Éditions Gérard Delacroix 2006, ISBN 2-9527406-0-7
- La Fleur de Lis, galère -1690-, Éditions Gérard Delacroix, 2008, ISBN 978-2-9527406-1-6
- L'Amarante, corvette -1747-, Éditions Gérard Delacroix, 2012, ISBN 978-2-9527406-2-3
- La Machine à curer les ports -1750-, Éditions Gérard Delacroix, 2013, ISBN 978-2-9527406-3-0
- Le Rochefort, yacht de port -1787-, Éditions Gérard Delacroix, 2015, ISBN 978-2-9527406-4-7
- L’Égyptienne, Frégate de 24 -1799-, Éditions Gérard Delacroix, 2019, ISBN 978-2-9527406-5-4
- L'Invention, quatre-mâts corsaire -1799-, ANCRE, 2022, ISBN 978-2-38282-039-1

=== External links ===
- Marine et Modélisme d'arsenal
- Editions ANCRE
