= Marie-Élisabeth Ozanne =

French artist (1739–1797)

Marie-Élisabeth Ozanne (1739–1797) was a French painter.

Born in Paris, Ozanne was the sister of marine artist Nicolas Ozanne; in 1763 she was received by the Académie de Saint-Luc, and in the following year exhibited portraits in pastel. Her work is reminiscent of that of portraitist Simon-Bernard Lenoir. Her brother-in-law was Jean-Pierre Moreau; he is the individual who registered her death, which occurred at 105 rue de la Tixeranderie in Paris.
