= François César Le Tellier, Marquis of Courtanvaux =

French astronomer

François César Le Tellier
- Marquis of Courtanvaux
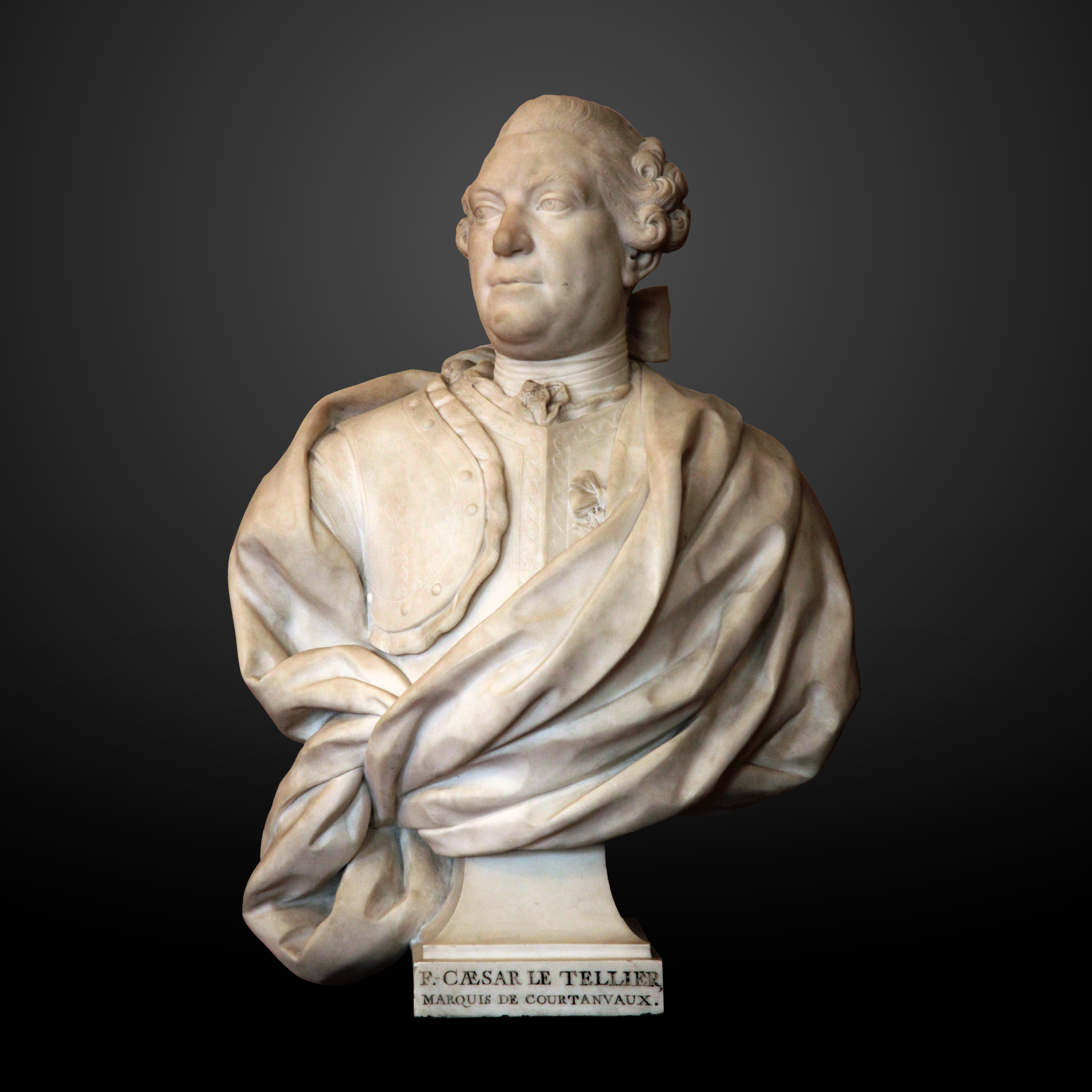
- Born: 18 February 1718; Paris
- Died: 7 July 1781 (aged 63); Paris
- Issue: Charles-François-César Le Tellier de Montmirail

François César Le Tellier, Marquis of Courtanvaux (Paris, 18 February 1718 – Paris, 7 July 1781), was the marquis of Courtanvaux, Count of Tonnerre, Duke of Doudeauville, and a French aristocrat, military officer, and scientist.

== Background and early life ==
Le Tellier was born in an aristocratic family, the grand-grandson of Minister François Michel Le Tellier, marquis de Louvois. After receiving a basic education he joined the Army. In 1733, aged 15, he took part in his first campaign as an aid in the staff of Marshal Louis de Noailles, who was his uncle. Promoted to Colonel in 1740, he led the Royal Regiment in the campaigns of Bohemia and Bavaria.

== Scientific career ==
In 1745, Le Tellier left the Army for health reasons. After a few years, he associated with Madame de Pompadour in an effort to revigorate dancing at the Court, from 1745 to 1754. He also grew interested in natural history, chemistry, geography, physics, mechanics and astronomy.

He gave his son, Charles François César Le Tellier, a thorough education, which earned him an honorary seat at the Academy of Sciences.

=== Contributions to chemistry ===
Le Tellier worked on "marine ether" and on the "inflammation of radical vinegar".

=== Marine chronometers ===
In 1767, the Academy of Sciences offered a prize for building a marine chronometer. Le Tellier had a ship built, Aurore, which he used to test the various candidates in real conditions at sea. The expedition also comprised Pingré, Messier and the watchmaker Le Roy, who had built two of the chronometers. Aurore sailed off France, Flander, and Holland in a three-month-and-a-half cruise, sustaining several storms to test whether the chronometers could sustain the movements of the ship. They also made frequent calls to port in order to check the working of the mechanisms and the precision of the longitude measurements made with the chronometers. In 1769, one of the Le Roy chronometers was awarded the prize by the Academy,

=== Colombes laboratory ===
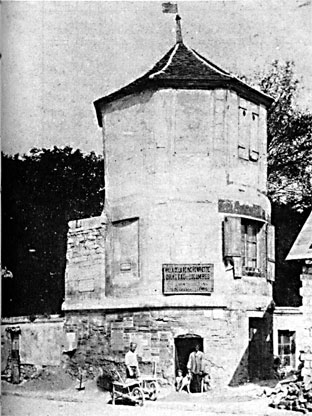
Colombes observatory tower

Le Tellier set up a laboratory and observatory in Colombes, which he would lend to his colleagues. He also had the tower equipped with state-of-the-art instruments, including some he had custom-built. He even built some himself after designs by others, yielding signatures such as Jeaurat invenit, Courtanvaux fecit ("designed by Jeaurat and made by Courtanvaux").

== Publications ==
- Œuvres complètes de Condorcet at Google Books, p. 145-156

== Bibliography ==
- Nicolas de Condorcet, « Éloge de M. le marquis de Courtanvaux », dans Histoire de l’Académie royale des Sciences - Année 1781, Imprimerie royale, 1784, p. 71-78 (lire en ligne).
- Luc-Normand Tellier, Face aux Colbert : les Le Tellier, Vauban, Turgot... et l'avènement du libéralisme, Presses de l'Université du Québec, 1987.Etexte.
