= Crown of Napoleon III =

French imperial crown made in 1855

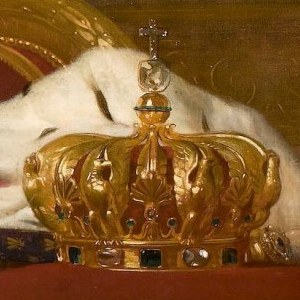
- The crown in Portrait of Napoleon III (Cabanel)

Heraldic depictions

Details
- Country: French Empire
- Made: 1855
- Destroyed: 1887
- Arches: 8
- Material: Gold
- Cap: Red Velvet
- Notable stones: Diamonds; Emeralds
- Predecessors: Crown of Charles X (Kingdom of France)
- Successors: None (monarchy abolished)

The Crown of Napoleon III (French: Couronne de Napoléon III) was a crown that was made for Napoleon III, Emperor of the French. Although he did not have a coronation ceremony, a crown was made for him on the occasion of the 1855 Exposition Universelle in Paris. The gold crown had eagle-shaped arches and others in the form of palmettes, set with diamonds, and topped by a monde.

During the same period, a consort crown was made for his empress consort, Eugénie de Montijo, which is known as the Crown of Empress Eugénie. After Napoleon III was overthrown in 1870, following the Franco-Prussian War, he and his wife lived in exile at Chislehurst in England, where he died in 1873.

The Crown of Napoleon III was dismantled in 1887 by the government of the French Third Republic.

== Gallery ==
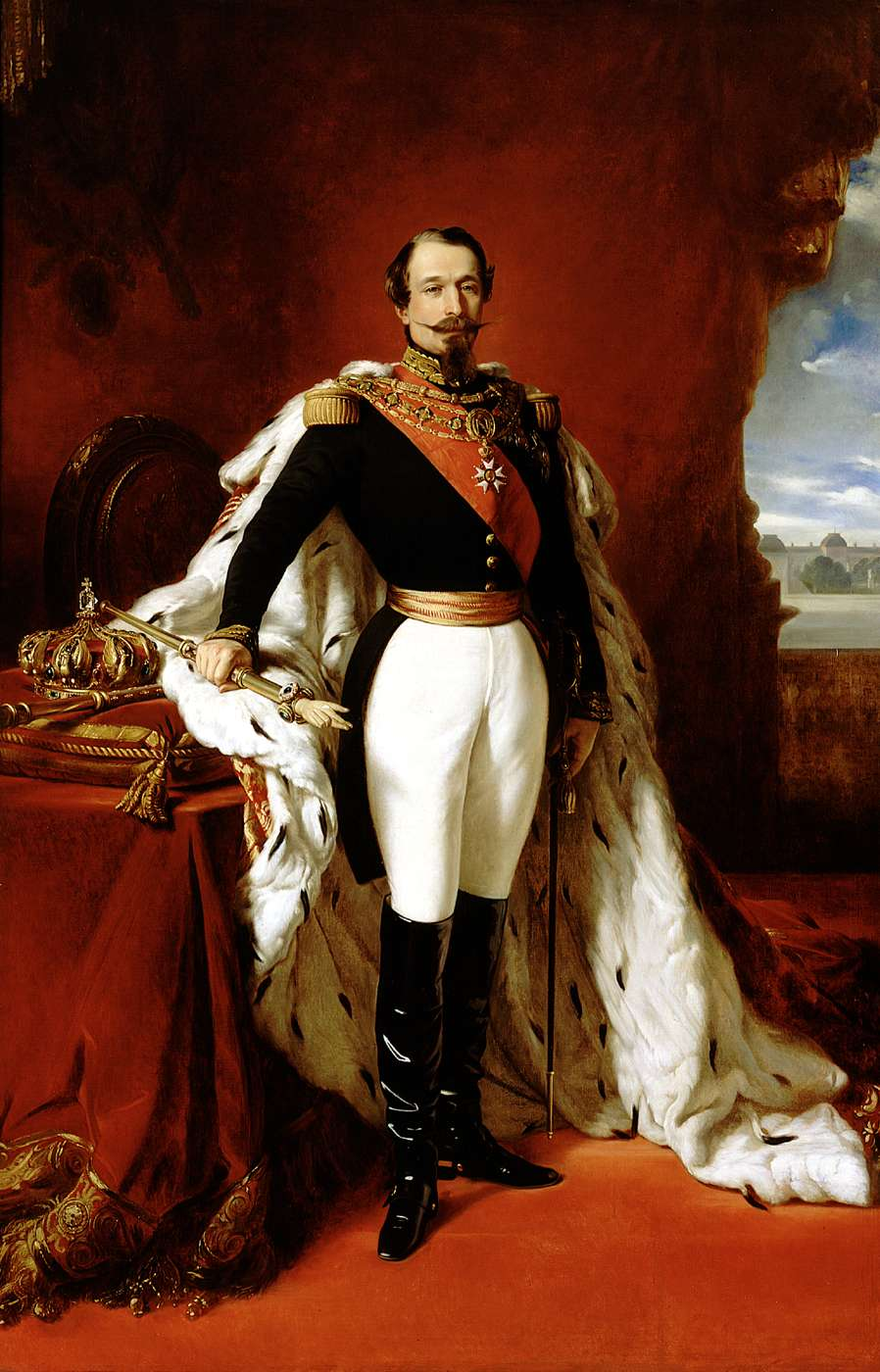
Portrait of Napoleon III in coronation robes, with the crown on the left, 1853

Coat of arms of the Second French Empire surmounted by the crown

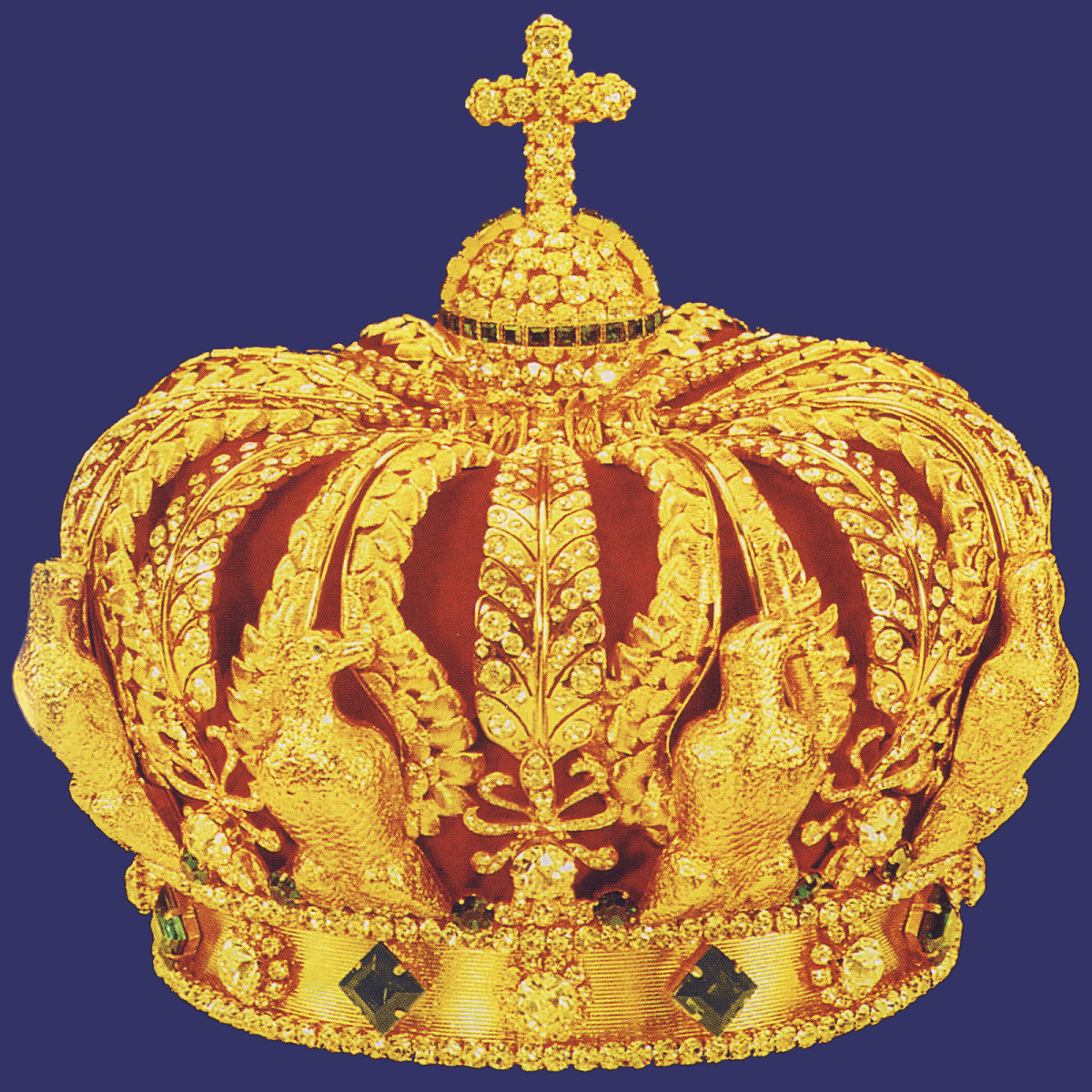
Modern reproduction of the crown

== See also ==
- Crown jewels
- Crown of Napoleon I
- Regalia
