= Crown of Napoleon =

Crown used in Napoleon's 1804 coronation

Crown of Napoleon I
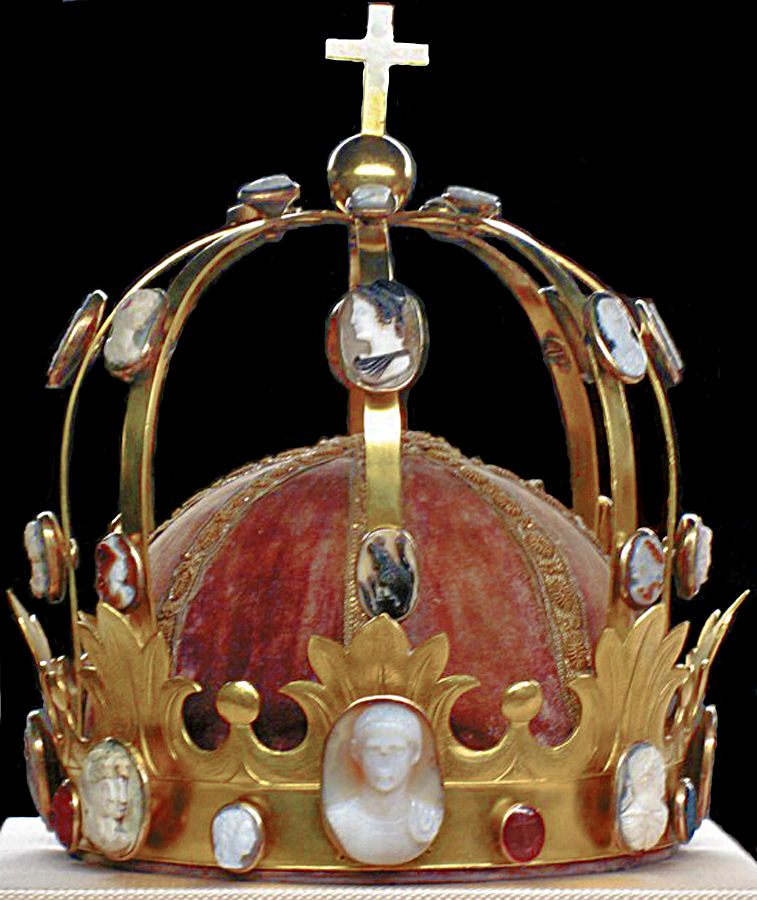
- The Crown of Napoleon, called the "Crown of Charlemagne" by the emperor himself

Heraldic depictions

Details
- Country: French Empire
- Made: 1804
- Owner: France
- Arches: 8
- Material: Silver-gilt
- Cap: Red velvet
- Other elements: Cameos
- Predecessors: Crown of Louis XVI (Kingdom of France)
- Successors: Crown of Charles X (Kingdom of France)

The Crown of Napoleon (French: Couronne de Napoléon I^{er}) was a coronation crown made for Napoleon I and used in his coronation as Emperor of the French on December 2, 1804. Napoleon called this crown the "Crown of Charlemagne", which was the name of the ancient royal coronation crown of France that had been destroyed during the French Revolution. This name allowed Napoleon to compare himself to the famed medieval monarch Charlemagne, King of the Franks and Holy Roman Emperor.

== Origins ==
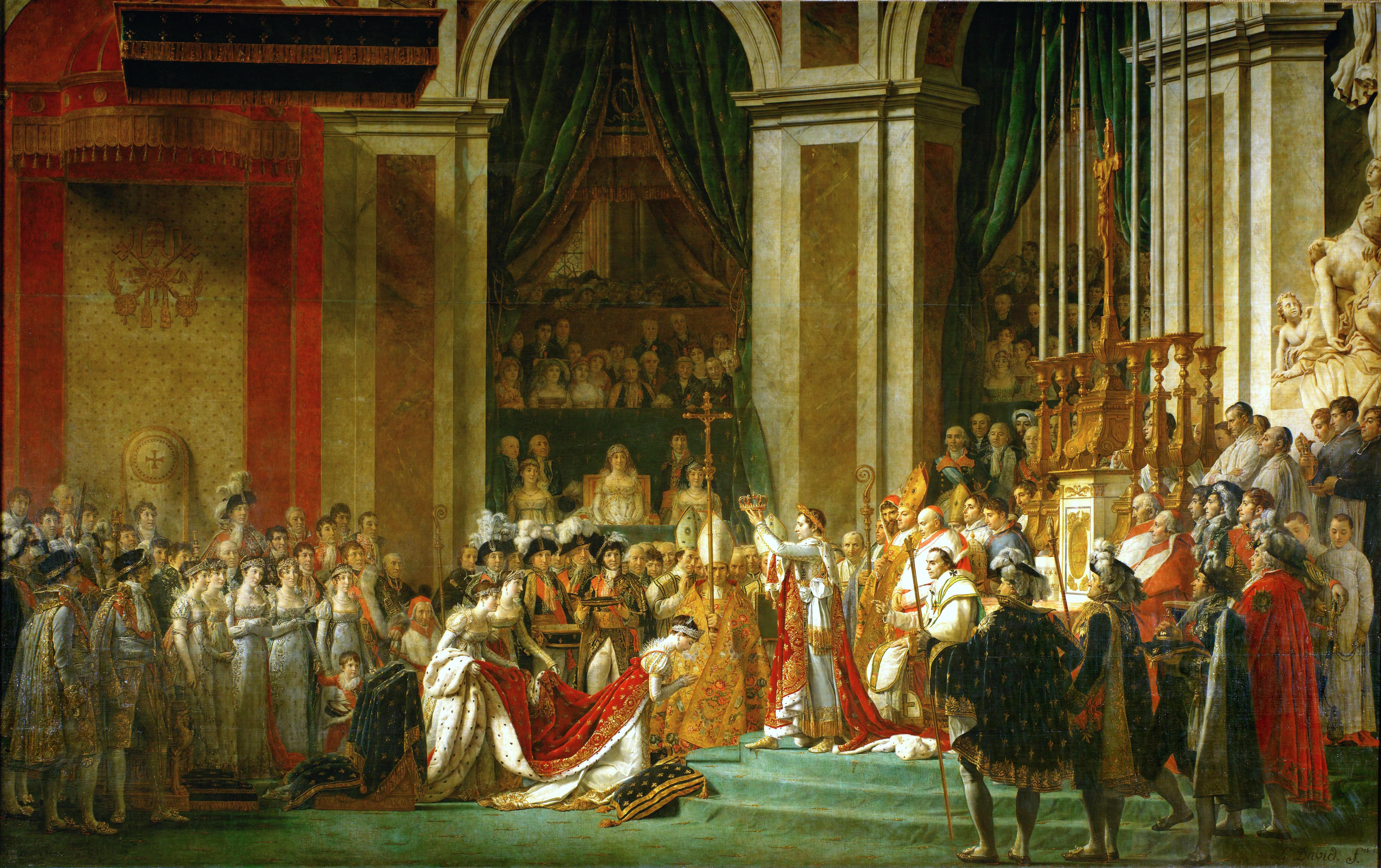
The Coronation of Napoleon, memorialised by Jacques-Louis David

The French Revolution of the 1790s had led to the destruction of most of the ancient French Crown Jewels, along with the eventual abolition of the French monarchy and the executions of King Louis XVI and Queen Marie Antoinette. When Napoleon declared himself Emperor of the French a decade later, he decided to create new imperial regalia, the centrepiece of which was his "Charlemagne crown".

Napoleon contributed to the authenticity of his new crown and claiming it was Charlemagne's by paying for a study in 1804 that attested the crown's authenticity and antiquity. To make this more credible, this publication claimed to have been published for the first time at the end of the Reign of Terror, as if the crown had survived the Revolution.

== Usage ==
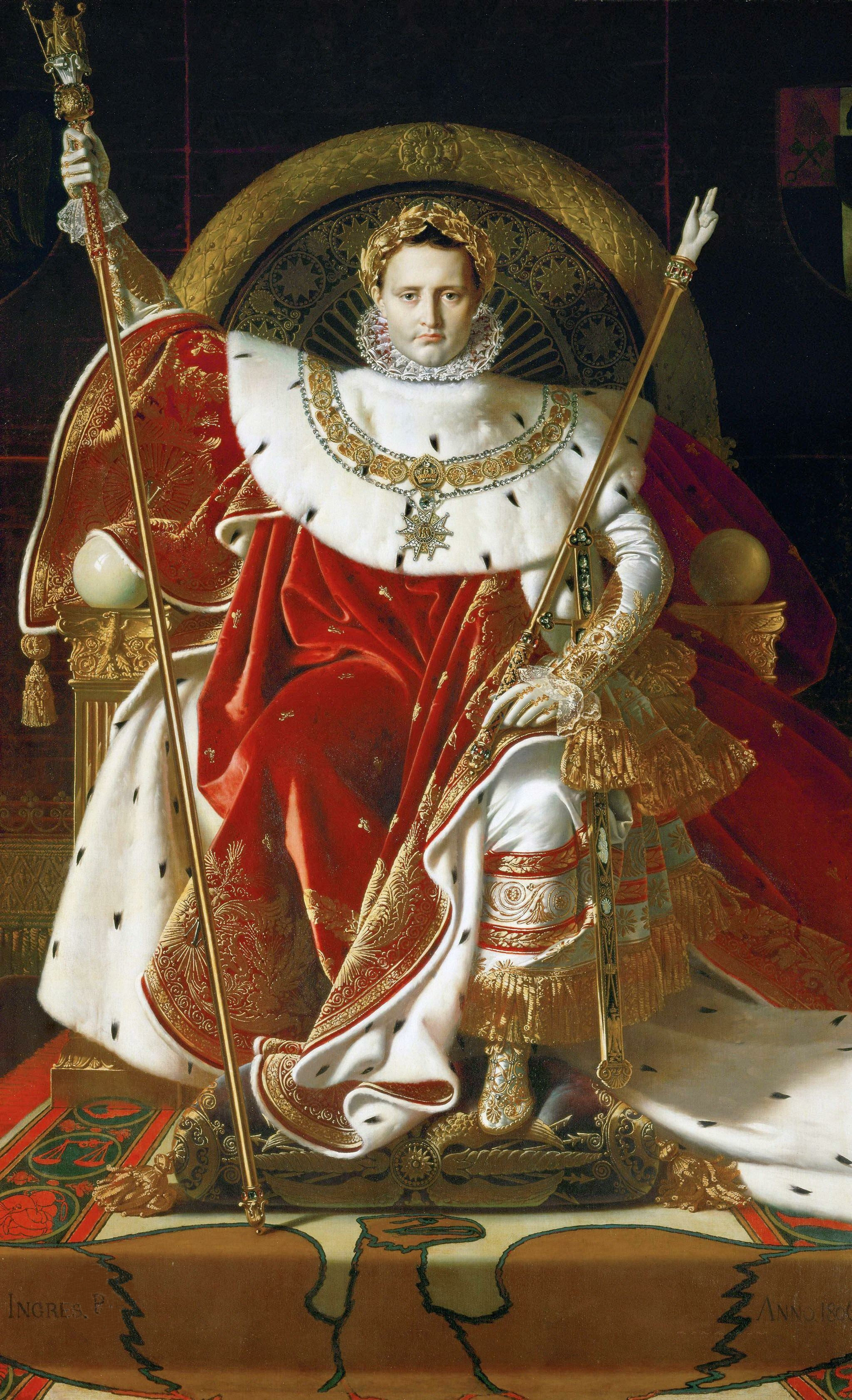
Napoleon I on His Imperial Throne, by Jean-Auguste-Dominique Ingres

At Napoleon's coronation, which took place at Notre Dame Cathedral instead of Reims Cathedral, the traditional location of French royal coronations, he actually used two crowns. Initially, he placed a laurel crown of the Roman emperors on his own head. Afterward, he briefly placed the imperial crown on his head, then touched it to the head of his empress, Joséphine.

== Design ==
As was the norm with Continental European crowns, Napoleon's crown is made up of eight half-arches. They are set with shell cameos and carved carnelians which meet at a golden globe, on top of which is placed a cross. The crown itself is mock mediaeval in style, reliant totally on gold and metallic decoration and devoid of the major covering with diamonds and jewels fashionable in crowns made later in the 19th century.

== After the First Empire ==
The Crown of Napoleon was used until his second overthrow in 1815. King Louis XVIII, brother of Louis XVI, was installed on the throne as King of France following Napoleon's overthrow. In contrast both to his brother and to Napoleon, the new king opted not to have a coronation. When his brother, Charles X became king in 1824, he reinstated the traditional monarchical coronation in Reims and he was crowned using the sole remaining pre-revolutionary French royal crown, the Crown of Louis XV. No more French coronations, either imperial or royal, followed Charles X's overthrow in 1830.

When Napoleon III proclaimed himself French emperor in 1852, he opted neither to have a coronation nor to wear Napoleon I's crown. Nevertheless, two crowns were created for him, the Crown of Napoleon III and, for his consort, the Crown of Empress Eugénie.

== Sale of the French crown jewels ==
In 1885, to impede any further attempts at royal or imperial restorations, the French National Assembly opted to sell most of the French crown jewels. Only a handful of crowns were kept for historic reasons, and they had their precious jewels replaced in them by decorated glass. Napoleon I's crown was one of the few kept. It was on display in the Louvre museum in Paris.
