= Alexandre Guy Pingré =

French canon regular, astronomer and naval geographer

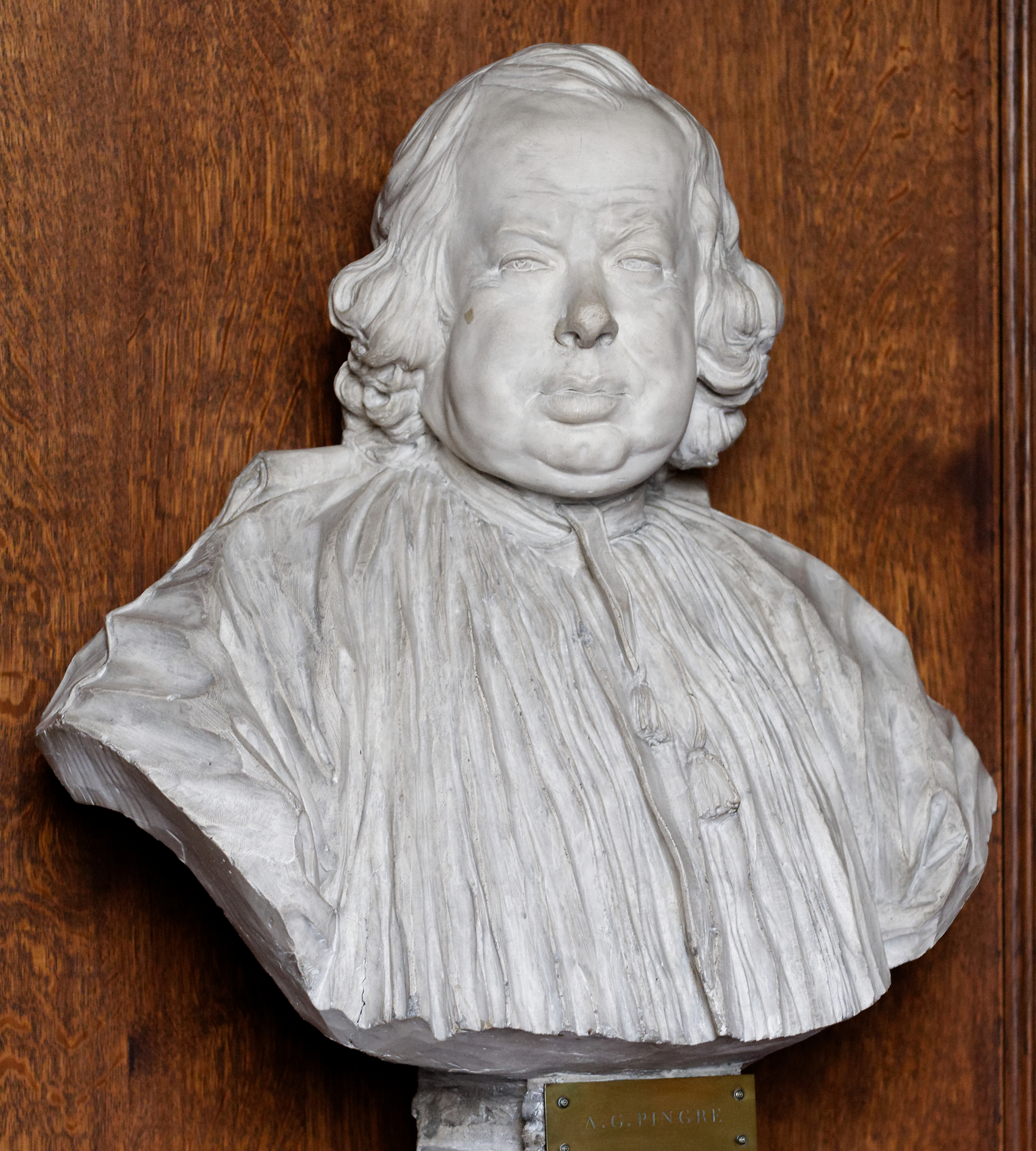
- Born: September 1711; Paris, France
- Died: 1 May 1796 (aged 84); Paris, France
- Notable work: État du Ciel
- Title: Dom
- Scientific career
- Fields: astronomy mathematics naval geography
- Institutions: Academy of Rouen; Abbey of St Genevieve

Dom Alexandre Guy Pingré (September 1711 – 1 May 1796) was a French canon regular, astronomer and naval geographer.

== Early life ==
Pingré was born in Paris but was educated by the canons regular of the Abbey of St. Vincent in Senlis, Oise, where he entered the community at the age of sixteen. In 1735, after his ordination as a priest, he was appointed professor of theology at the school. Soon, however, he came under suspicion of subscribing to Jansenism and was summoned by the Bishop of Pamiers, by whom he was rebuked and required to submit to an interrogation by a committee of Jesuits.

In 1745 King Louis XV called a General Chapter of the Congregation of Canons Regular of St. Genevieve to which Pingré belonged. He commanded the election of a canon who would enforce the royal policy against Jansenist teachings. Participation in the chapter required an oath of obedience to the papal bull Unigenitus, which had been issued to condemn those teachings. Pingré and several other canons of Senlis objected to the chapter and were removed from their positions of responsibility in the congregation. He subsequently was assigned to serve only in rural parishes.

== Scientist ==
At an early age Pingré had developed an interest in astronomy, and in 1749 he was appointed professor of astronomy at the newly founded Academy of Rouen. He would eventually be appointed the librarian of the Abbey of St Genevieve in Paris, and the university's chancellor. At St. Genevieve he would build an observatory, and continue to work there for forty years.

Unfortunately Pingré suffered from poor health and eyesight, so his observing skills were limited, but he did earn a reputation as an excellent mathematician. He came to the attention of the scientific community when he detected an error of four minutes in Lacaille's computation of a 1749 lunar eclipse. After observing a transit of Mercury, he was made a corresponding member of the Académie des Sciences. In 1757 he became interested in comets and published a substantial treatise on the theory and observational history of comets.

Subsequently he published a nautical almanac based on the work of Pierre Charles Lemonnier containing lunar tables. During the 1761 transit of Venus, Pingré went on one of the three observing campaigns organized by the Académie Royale, travelling to Rodrigues Island near Madagascar, which was unsuccessful. Pingré's subsequent discounting of Giovanni Battista Audiffredi's observations led to a scientific dispute.

In 1767 he sailed to the Baltic with Charles Messier to test marine chronometers. Two years later he joined a successful expedition to Haiti to observe the Venus transit of 1769. In 1771 he took part in the scientific mission of the frigate Flore, under Lieutenant Verdun de la Crenne, along with Borda.

The Pingré crater on the Moon is named after him, as is the asteroid 12719 Pingré.

== Death ==
Pingré was left impoverished upon the suppression of his monastery in the French Revolution. He was able to continue publishing his work until his death in 1796, however, through the support of fellow astronomer, Jérôme Lalande, who obtained for him a grant of 3,000 francs from the National Assembly.

== Bibliography ==
- État du Ciel, 1754–1757.
- Cométographie; ou, Traité historique et théorique des comètes, 1783.
- Projet d'une histoire d'astronomie du dix-septième siècle. 1756–1786.

== See also ==
- List of Roman Catholic scientist-clerics
- IMSLP Pieces for organ by François D'Agincourt, Boyvin and others, collected and copied by Pingré.
