= Treasury of Saint-Denis =

Main repository of the regalia of the Kingdom of France

The Treasury of Saint-Denis, kept at the Basilica of Saint-Denis in Paris until the French Revolution, was the main repository of the regalia of the Kingdom of France, including the ancien régime portion of what are now known as the French Crown Jewels. Its surviving items are presently scattered between the Louvre, the Cabinet des Médailles of the French National Library, and other museums.

A complementary set of coronation-related regalia was kept at Reims Cathedral, where some remain exhibited at the Palace of Tau.

== History ==
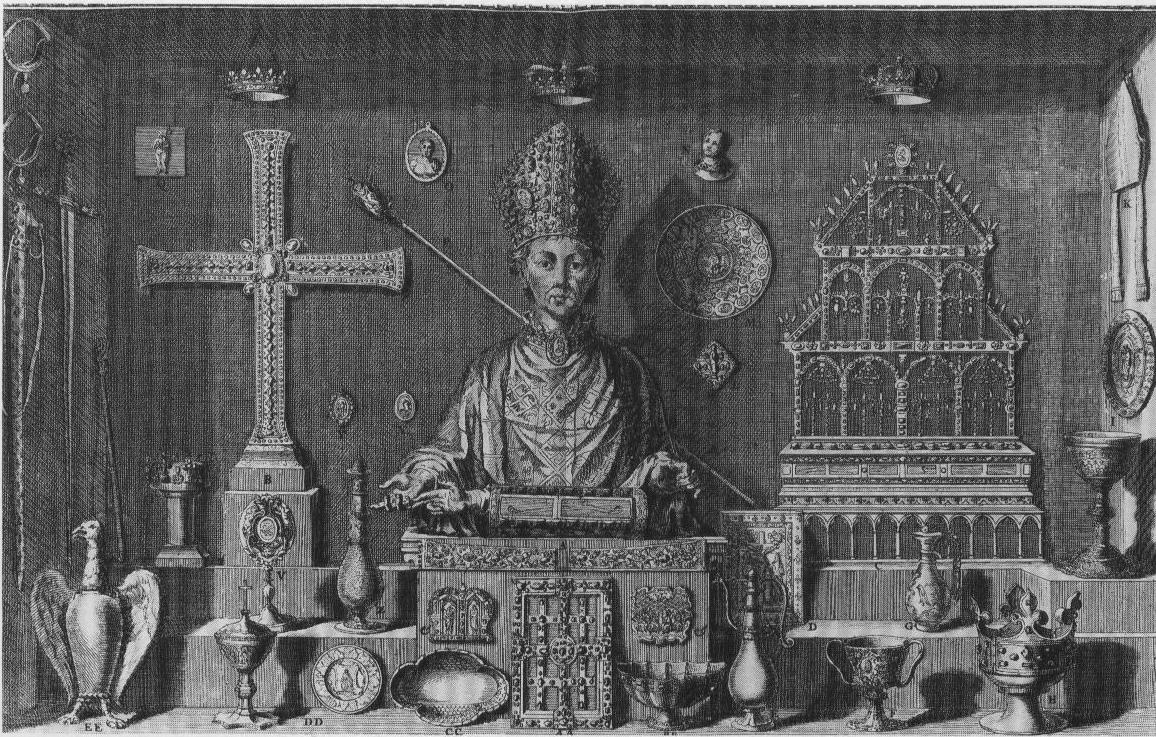
One of the engravings from the description of the treasury by Michel Félibien, 1706. Among other objects, it depicts Joyeuse (far left), the Cross of Saint Eligius (left), the bust reliquary of Saint Benedict (center), the Screen of Charlemagne (right); and on the front row, from left to right, Suger's Eagle, the Navette de Saint Denis, the Sardonyx Ewer, and the Crown of Charlemagne.

The abbey of Saint Denis became a royal necropolis with the burial there of Dagobert I in the 7th century, confirmed as such by the burials of Charles Martel and Pepin the Short, and became an anchor shrine of the French monarchy under the early Capetian dynasty. Major donors also included Charles the Bald in the 9th century, Louis VI and Louis VII at the time when Suger was both the Saint-Denis abbot and a key royal adviser, Philip II, Saint Louis, and other French monarchs. As centuries went by, many objects acquired a semi-mythical aura and were given anachronistic labels as having belonged to Solomon, Saint Denis, Dagobert, Charlemagne, Roland, Saint Louis, and other iconic figures of the past.

A number of the treasury's precious objects, including the main royal crown, were destroyed during the French Wars of Religion. In 1706, the treasury was described in detail by the Maurist scholar Michel Félibien in his Histoire de l'abbaye royale de Saint-Denys en France, including engravings of the precious objects, at a time when they were kept in seven large wooden closets.

Many others objects were looted or destroyed during the turmoil of the French Revolution. A number of objects, including the throne of Dagobert, were transferred to the National Library in September 1791. In 1792, following legislation in May that abolished congregations, religious activity stopped at the abbey. Turmoil followed a year later, as the royal necropolis was desecrated in October 1793. On 5 December 1793, some of the treasury's objects were deposited in the Louvre museum. Others were sold in July 1798, such as the 7th-century "brooch of Dagobert”. Even among the objects that had been taken under public custody, some were stolen, in 1795 from the Louvre and in 1804 from the Bibliothèque nationale. Others were stolen in 1830. Meanwhile, the reconstituted canons of Saint-Denis acquired several ancient objects to replenish their treasury, and others were donated by the monarchs during the Bourbon Restoration, but a number of these were stolen again in 1882. A few additional items disappeared during the 20th century.

In 1991, the treasury of Saint-Denis was the theme of an exhibition at the Louvre.

== Selected lost items ==
- Two near-identical crowns both known successively as the Crown of Charlemagne (or alternatively, of Saint Louis), actually the coronation crowns of Philip II of France and his wife Ingeborg of Denmark. These were donated to the abbey by Philip in 1223, then taken back by Louis VIII and donated again by Saint Louis in 1261. The king's crown was melted in 1590 by Charles de Guise during the Catholic League's rule in Paris. The queen's crown was subsequently used as a substitute and correspondingly also known as the Crown of Charlemagne; a still-extant emerald known as the émeraude de Saint Louis is believed by some scholars to be from that crown. Another crown, known as the Crown of Joan of Évreux, was used for the queens' coronation. Both disappeared in 1793 during the French Revolution.
- The early Bourbon kings had two crowns each made for their coronation, one of gold and the other silver-gilt: the Treasury kept the corresponding six crowns of Henry IV, Louis XIII and Louis XIV. It also had funeral crowns created for Anne of Austria, Maria Theresa of Spain, Henrietta Maria, Philippe of Orléans, and Maria Anna Victoria of Bavaria.
- Scepter of Saint Louis, main scepter of the kings of France, probably created around 1300, decorated with a large Fleur-de-lis, disappeared in 1589 or 1590
- Sceptre à la rose, main scepter of the queens of France, melted in 1589 or 1590 by destitute monks of the abbey
- Scepter of Dagobert, believed to have been created by Saint Eligius in the 7th century, stolen in 1795 from the Louvre
- Several versions of the "Hand of Justice" (main de justice), often held together with the scepter of Saint Louis, all destroyed during the Revolution; a 1804 recreation for the coronation of Napoleon I, which includes older elements including the 13th-century "ring of Saint Denis", is held in the Louvre
- Fermail de la chappe, a large brooch that was used on the royal coronational mantle, sold in 1798
- "Screen of Charlemagne" (escrain de Charlemagne), a 9th-century piece of monumental jewelry of which the crowning gem remains, known as the intaille de Julie, kept at the Cabinet des Médailles
- Reliquary of a piece of the True Cross donated by Baldwin I of Constantinople to Philip II, 13th century
- Bust reliquary of Saint Denis, late 13th century, disappeared in 1793
- Bust reliquary of Saint Benedict, donated in 1401 by John, Duke of Berry, melted during the French Revolution; some of its cameos were reused in the 1804 Crown of Napoleon, now in the Louvre
- Shrine of the relics of Saint Louis, 16th century, melted down in 1794
- Cross of Saint Eligius (croix de Saint Eloi), a 7th-century processional cross; a fragment remains in the Cabinet des Médailles
- Cross Reliquary of Saint Lawrence, a gift from Charles the Bald, melted down in 1793
- A piece of alabaster known as "jug from the Marriage at Cana", thought to have been lost during World War I
- Oriflamme or battle standard of France, documented mainly between the 12th and 15th centuries

== Selected surviving items ==
- Throne of Dagobert, 7th/8th/9th centuries, Cabinet des Médailles
- Joyeuse or the "Sword of Charlemagne", 10th to 13th centuries, Louvre
- Coronation spurs, parts from the 12th, 16th and 19th centuries, Louvre
- Scepter of Charles V also known as "scepter of Charlemagne", 14th century, Louvre
- Crown of Louis XV of France, created for his coronation in 1722, Louvre
- "Emerald of Saint Louis", possibly from the (second) "crown of Charlemagne", National Museum of Natural History
- "Ring of Saint Louis", 14th century, Louvre
- "Brooch of Saint Louis" (fermail de Saint Louis), 14th century, Louvre
- Cup of the Ptolemies, sculpted in onyx, 3rd century BC, Cabinet des Médailles
- "Cup of Solomon", more recently known as cup of Khosrow, a Sasanian creation of the 6th or 7th century, Cabinet des Médailles
- Cameo of Augustus (sometimes referred to as of Germanicus), 1st century CE, Cabinet des Médailles
- Chalcedony bust of Augustus, 1st century, Cabinet des Médailles
- Saint-Denis Crystal, 9th century engraved gem, British Museum, London
- Paten of serpentine, 9th century, Louvre
- Charlemagne chessmen, several chess pieces in ivory created in the 11th century, Cabinet des Médailles
- "Olifant of Roland", ivory, Cabinet des Médailles
- Reliquary of the bones of Saint Pancras, 13th century, Rouen Cathedral
- Ivory statue of the Virgin and Child, 14th century, Taft Museum of Art, Cincinnati
- Virgin of Jeanne d'Evreux, 14th century silver-gilt sculpture, Louvre
- "Navette de Saint Denis", a vessel from the 9th or 10th century with 11th-century decoration, Cabinet des Médailles
- a series known as the vases de Suger as they were created under Suger's rule from earlier stone vessels:
  - Chalice of Suger, with on onyx cup of the 2nd or 1st century BC, National Gallery of Art, Washington DC
  - Suger's Eagle, with a 2nd-century porphyry vase, Louvre
  - Vase of Eleanor, with a 6th- or 7th-century Persian rock-crystal vessel, Louvre
  - Aiguière aux oiseaux ("Ewer with birds"), with a 10th- or 11th-century Egyptian rock-crystal vessel, Louvre
  - Sardonyx ewer (Aiguière en Sardoine), with a vase possibly from 7th-century Byzantium, also in the Louvre

== Gallery ==
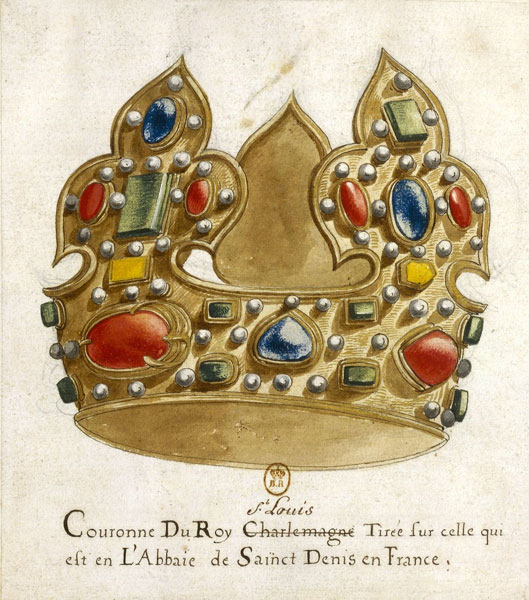
"Crown of Charlemagne"

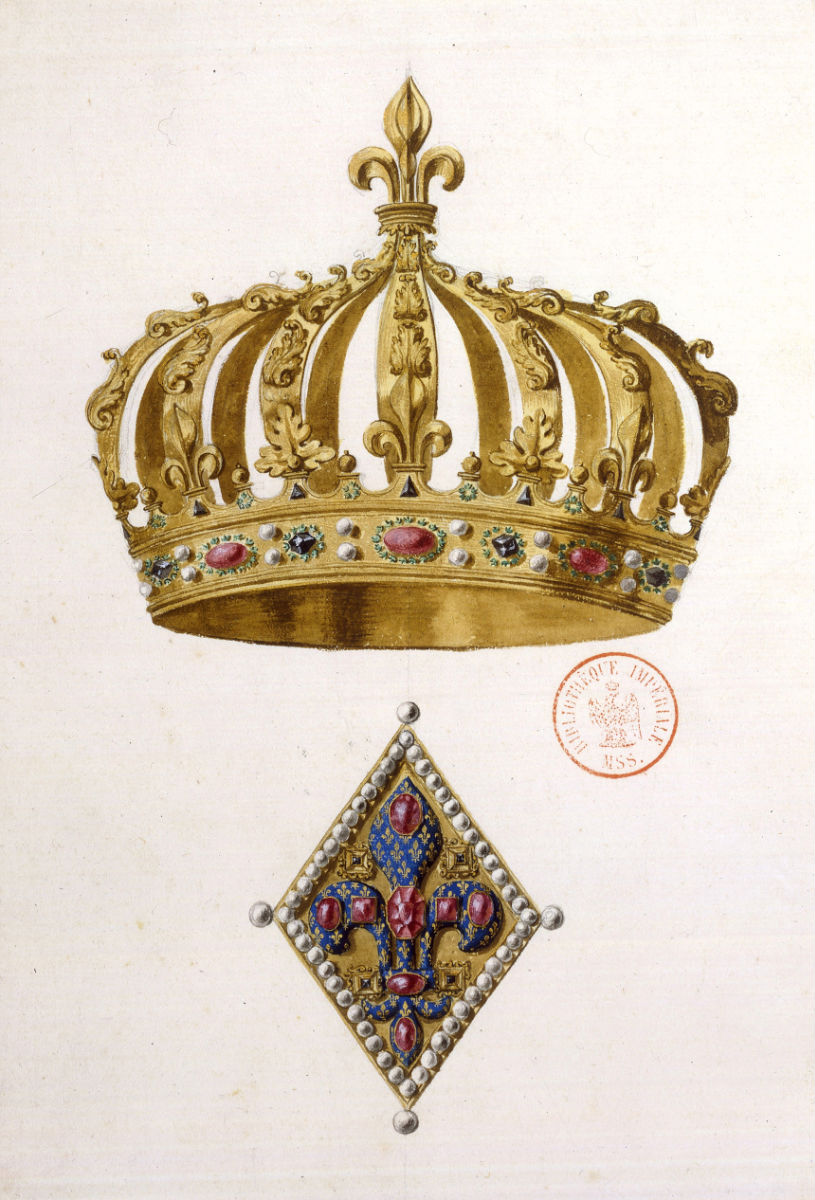
One of the two coronation crowns of Henry IV and the fermail de la chappe

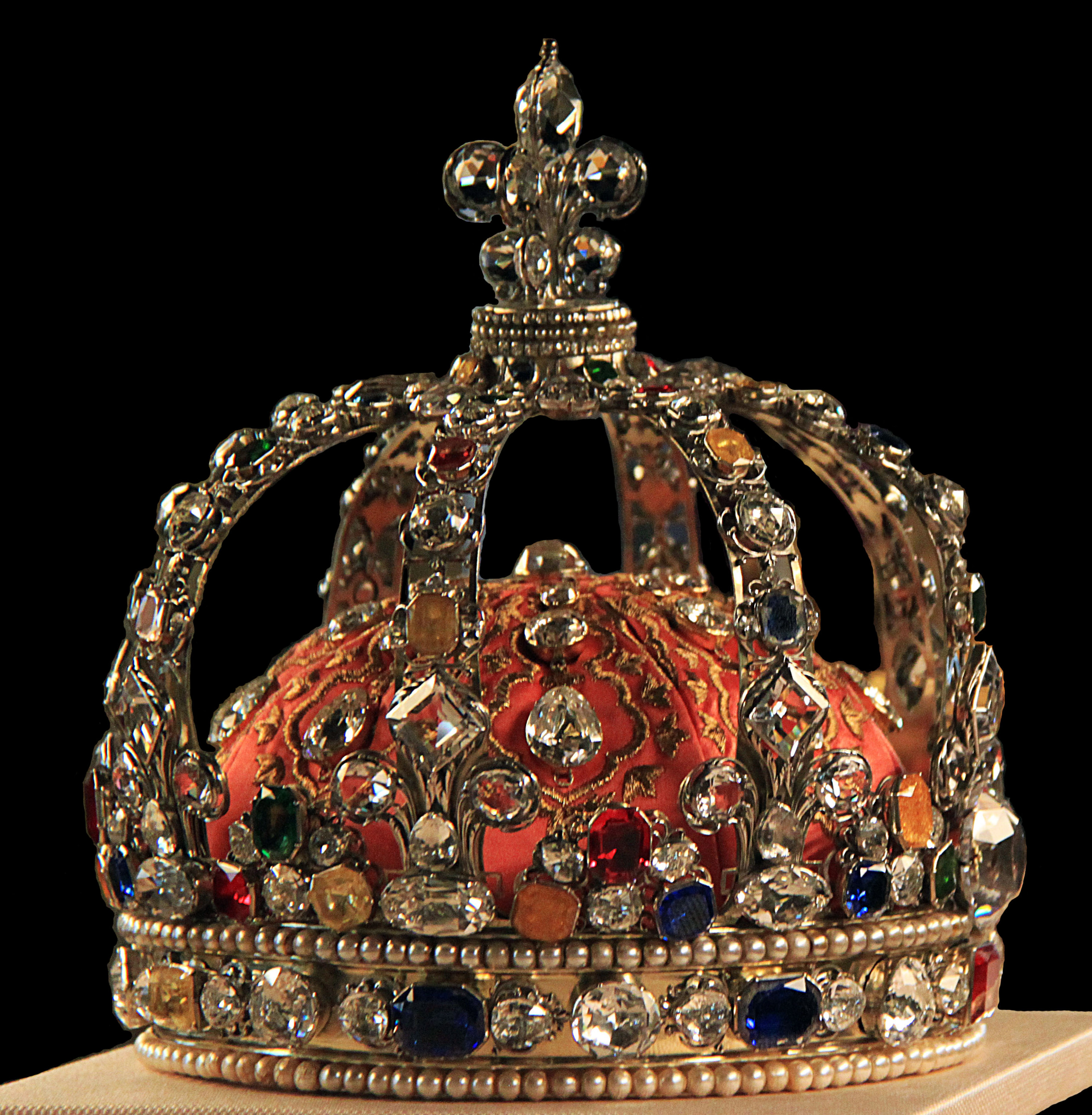
Crown of Louis XV

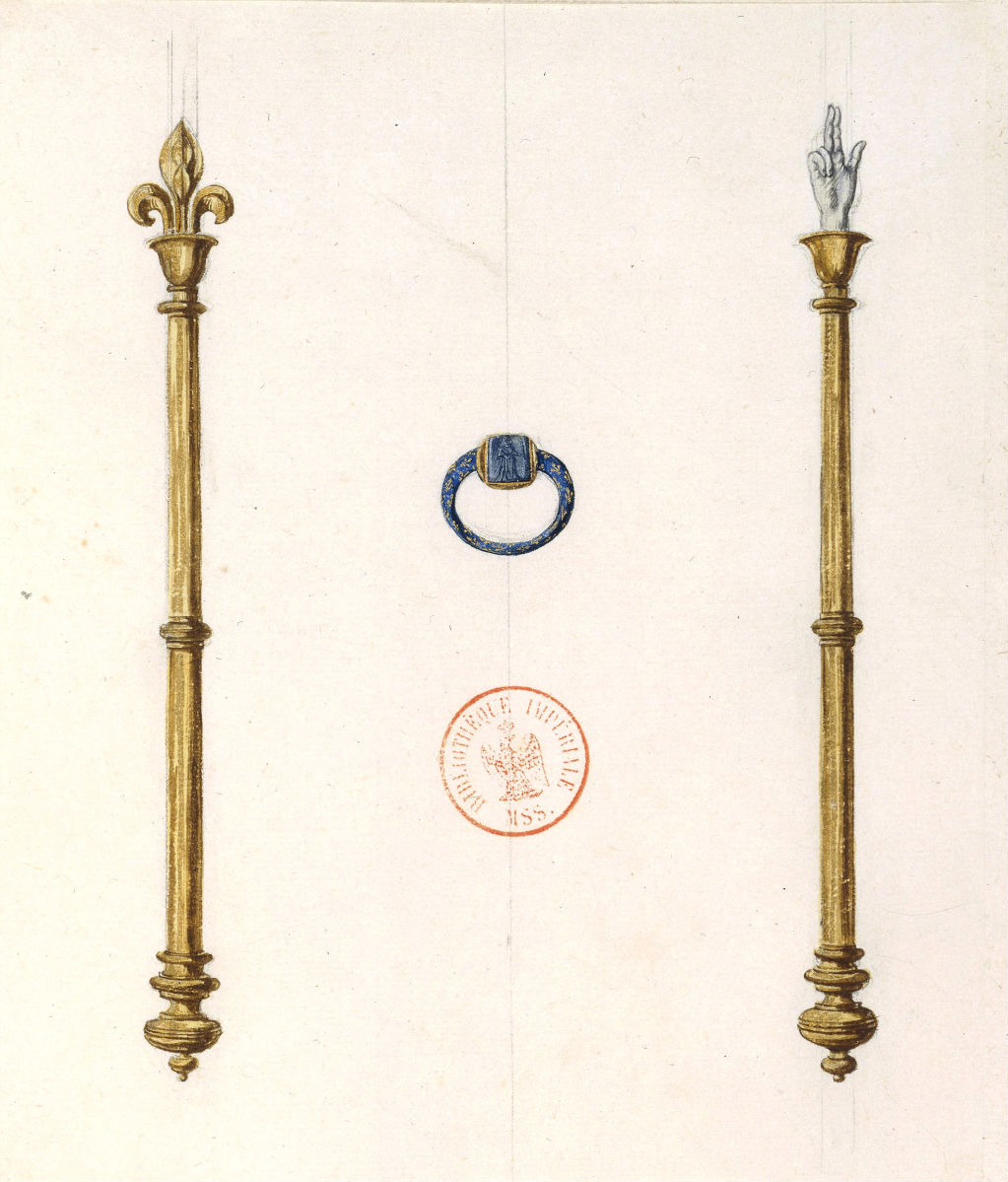
"Scepter of Louis IX" and the "hand of justice"

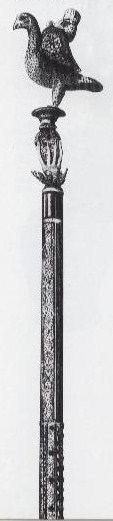
"Scepter of Dagobert"

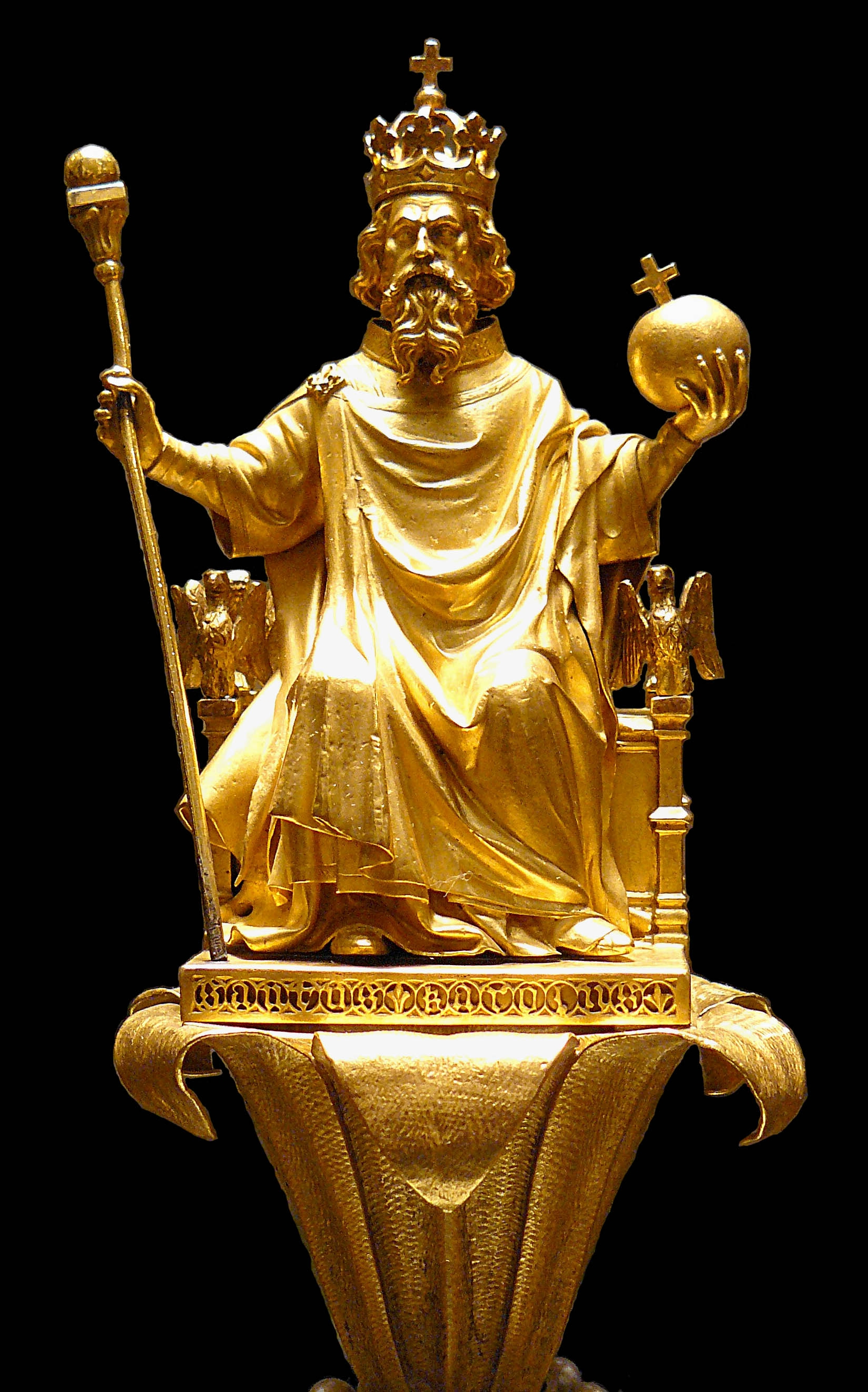
Detail of the scepter of Charles V, or "scepter of Charlemagne"

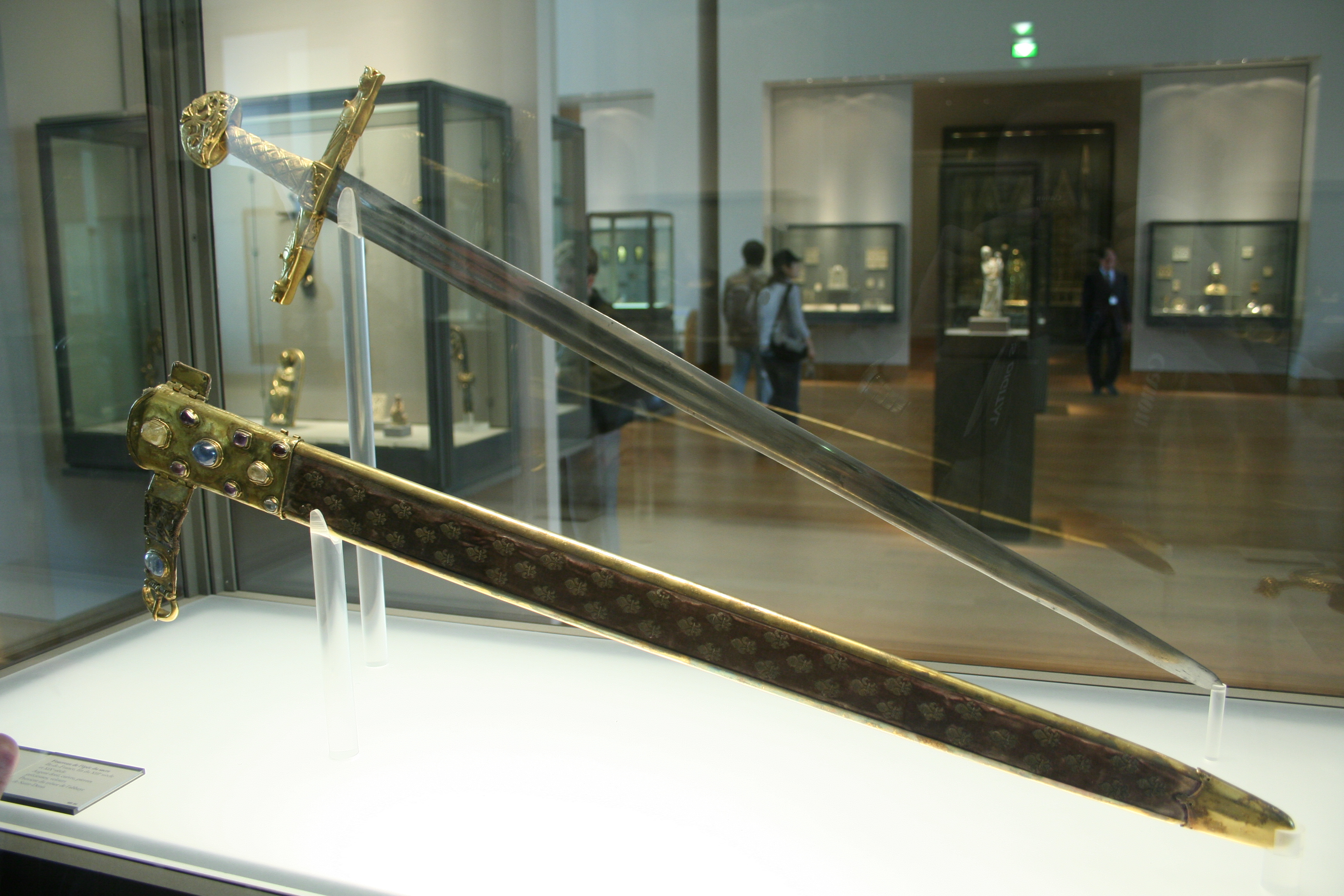
Joyeuse

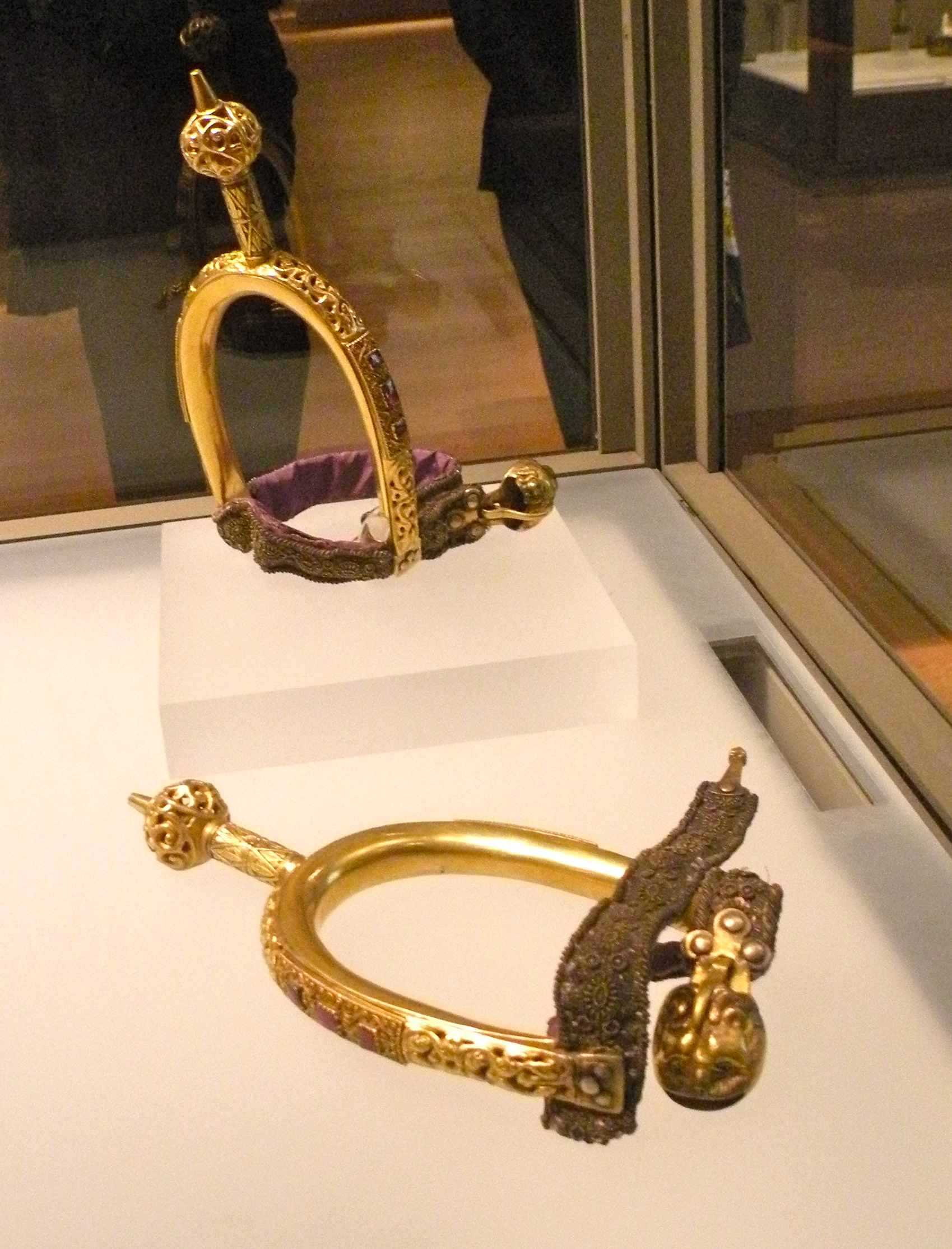
"Coronation spurs"

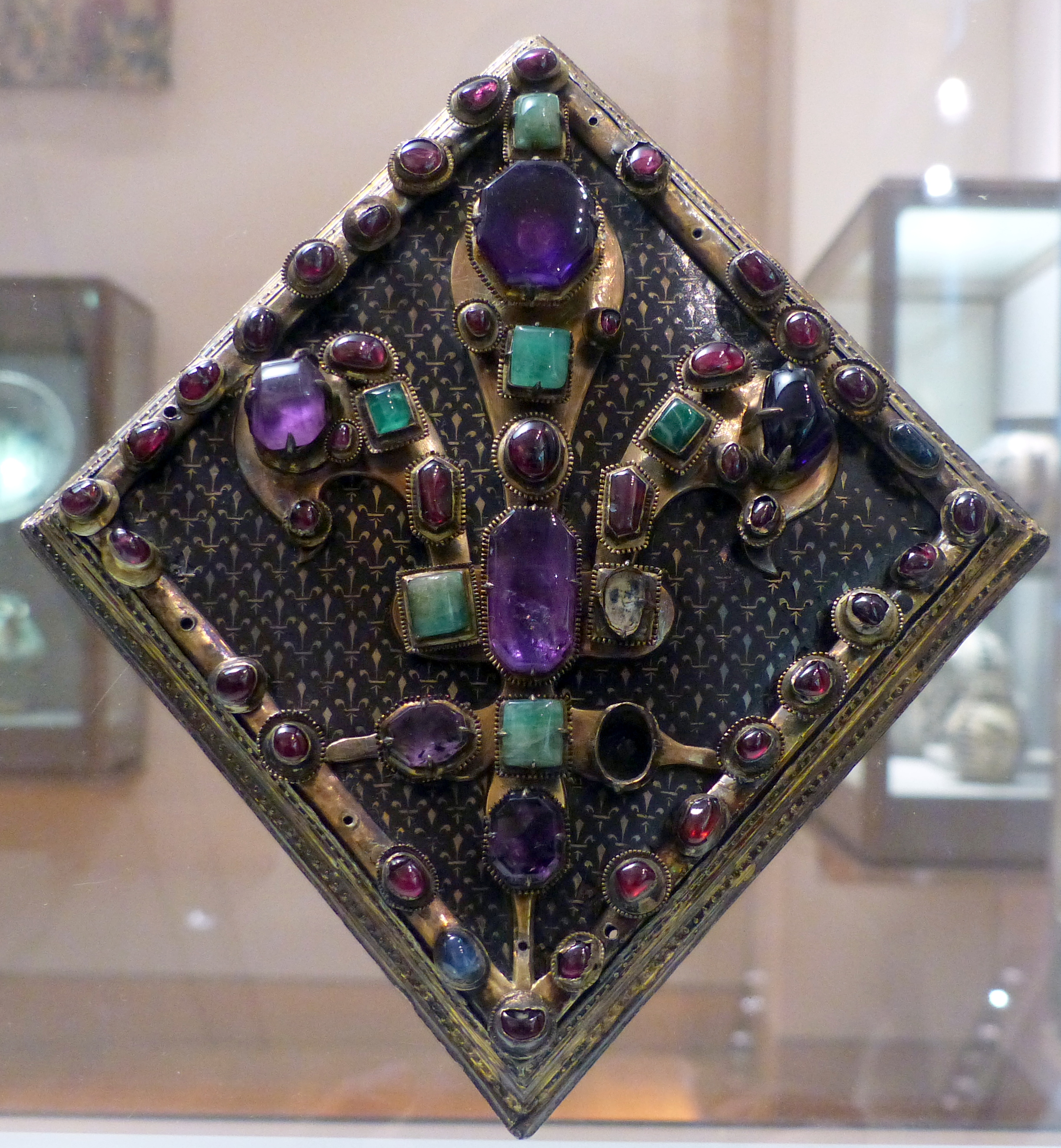
"Brooch of Saint Louis"

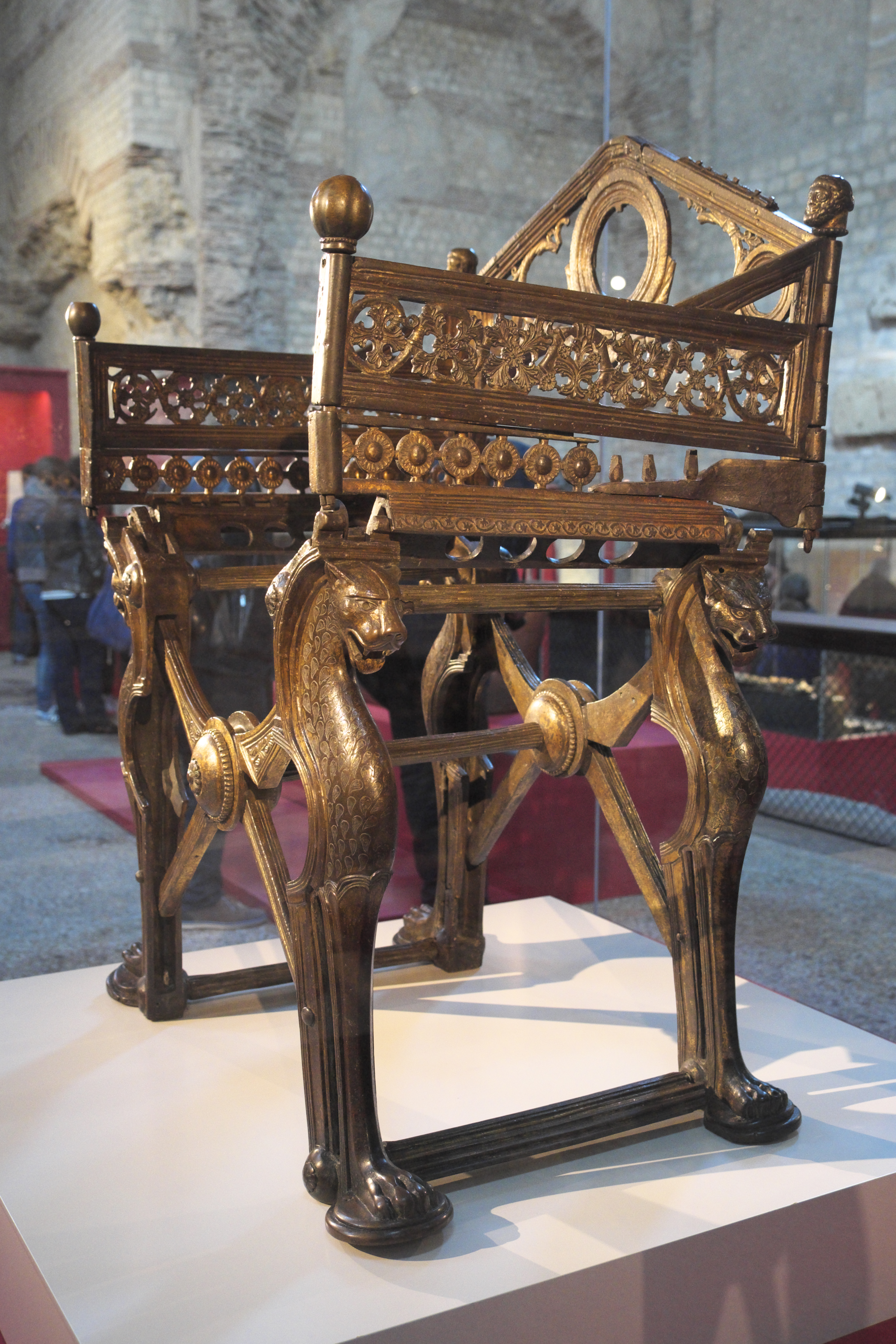
"throne of Dagobert"

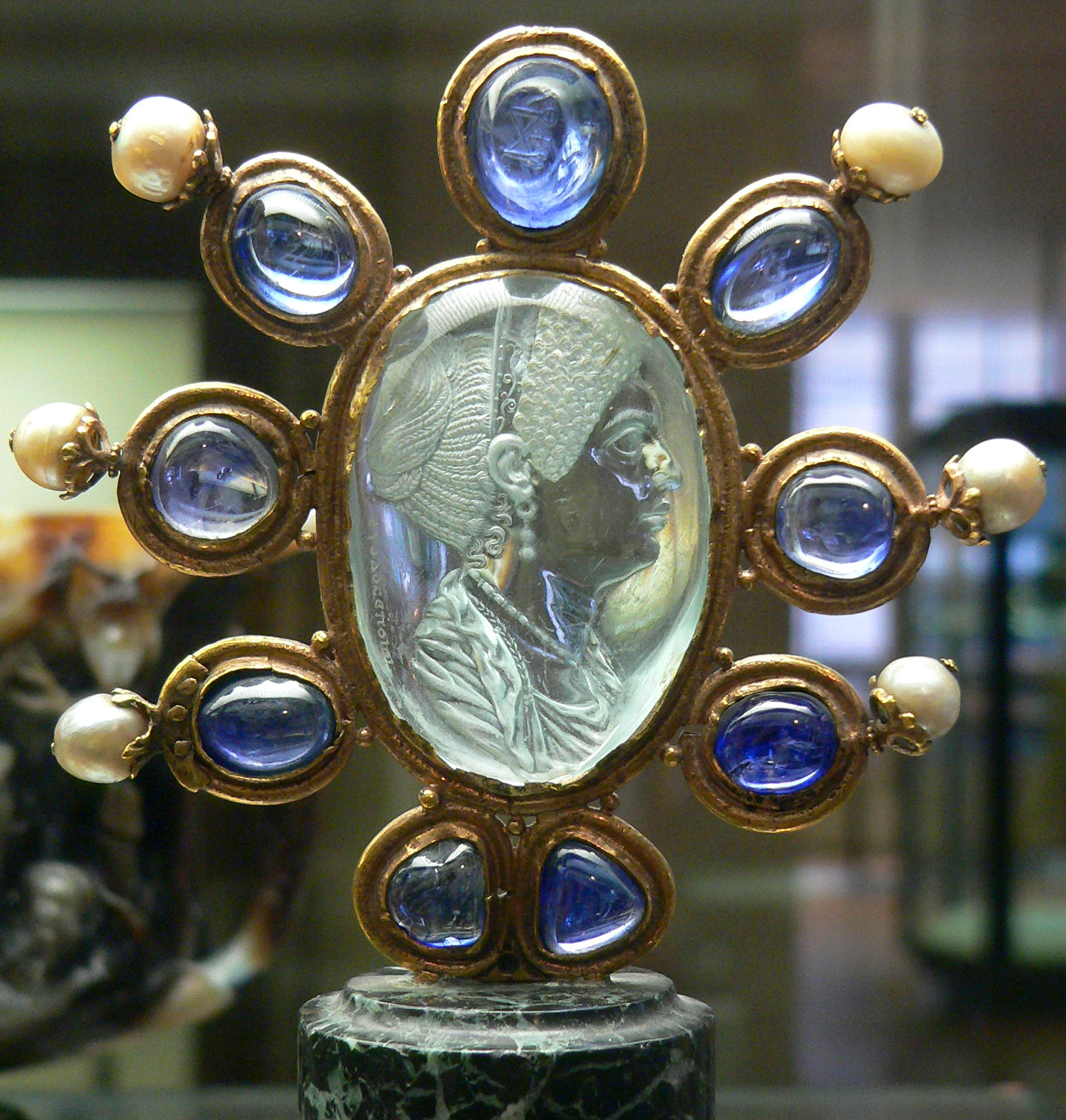
Engraved gem of Julia Flavia, only remaining part of the "Screen of Charlemagne"

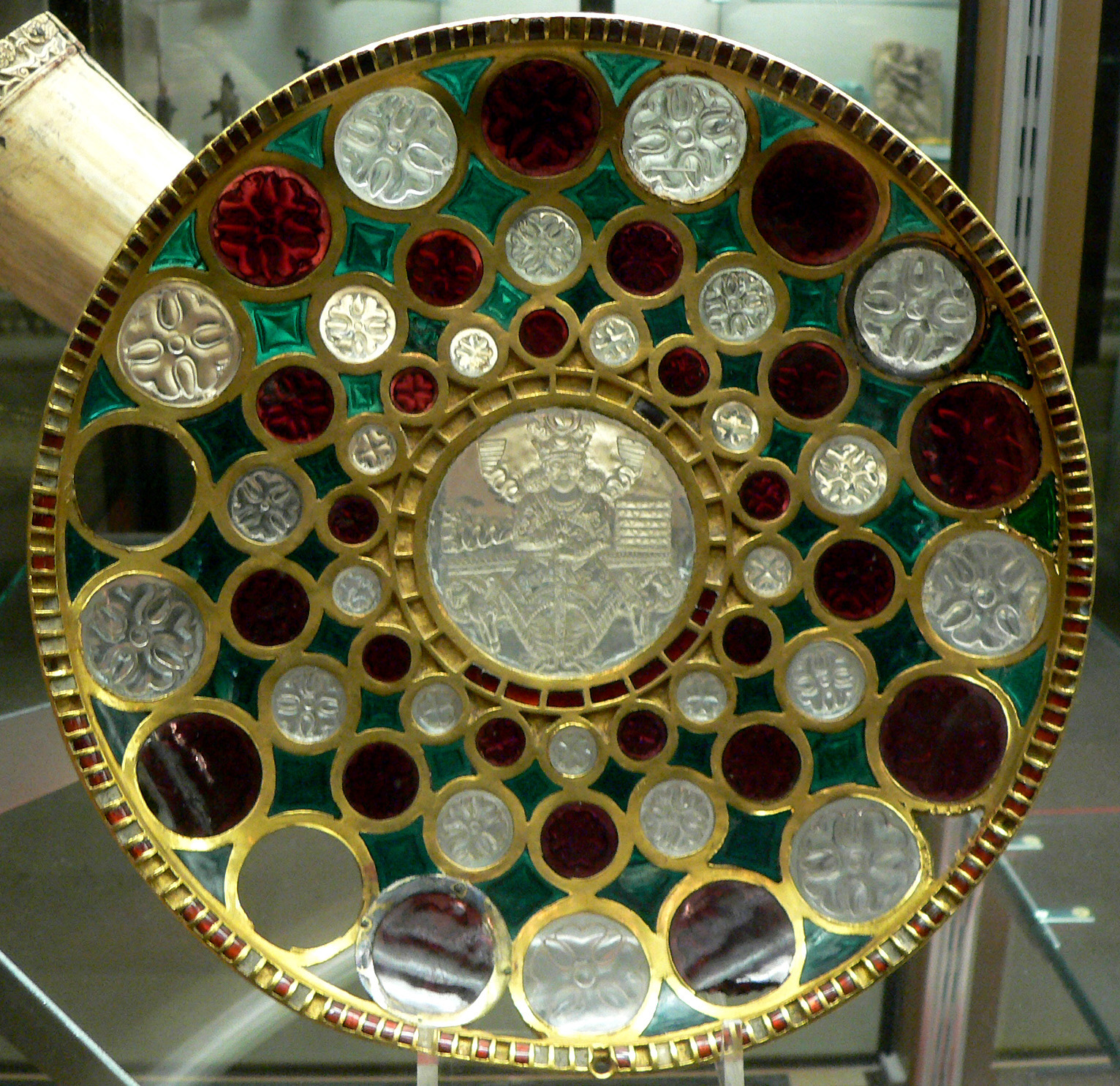
"Cup of Solomon" (or of Khosrow)

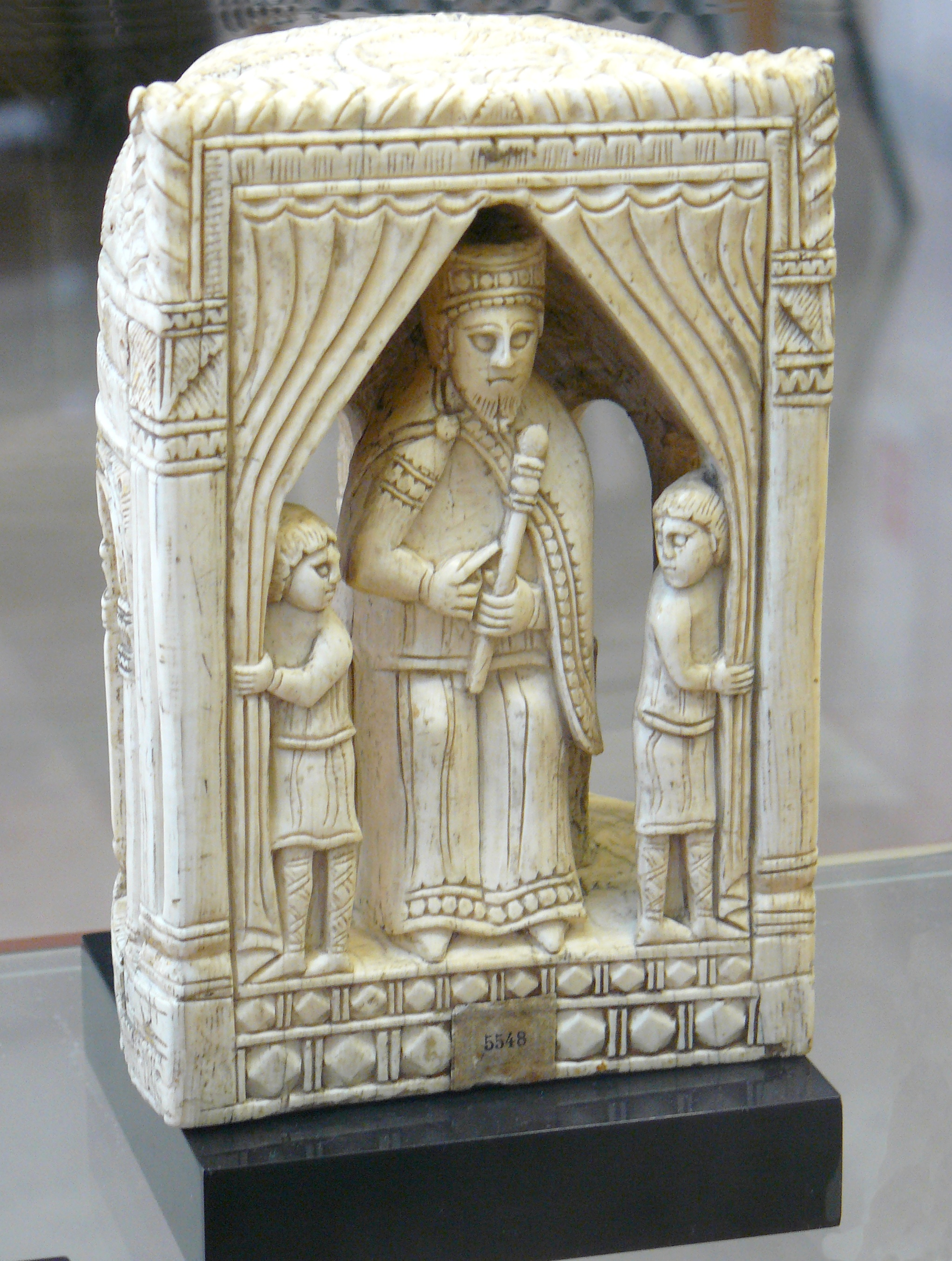
The King piece of "Charlemagne's chess"

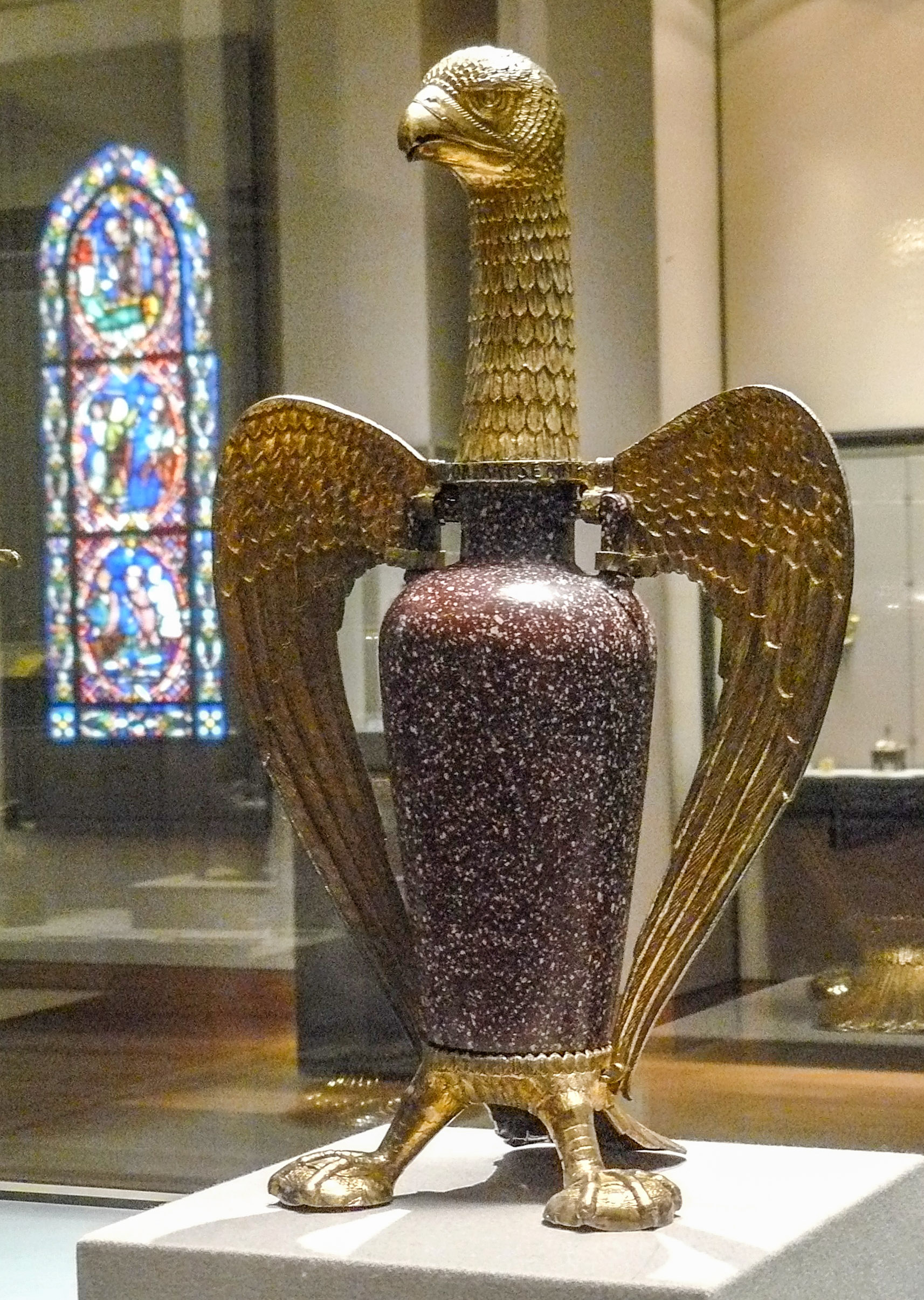
Suger's Eagle

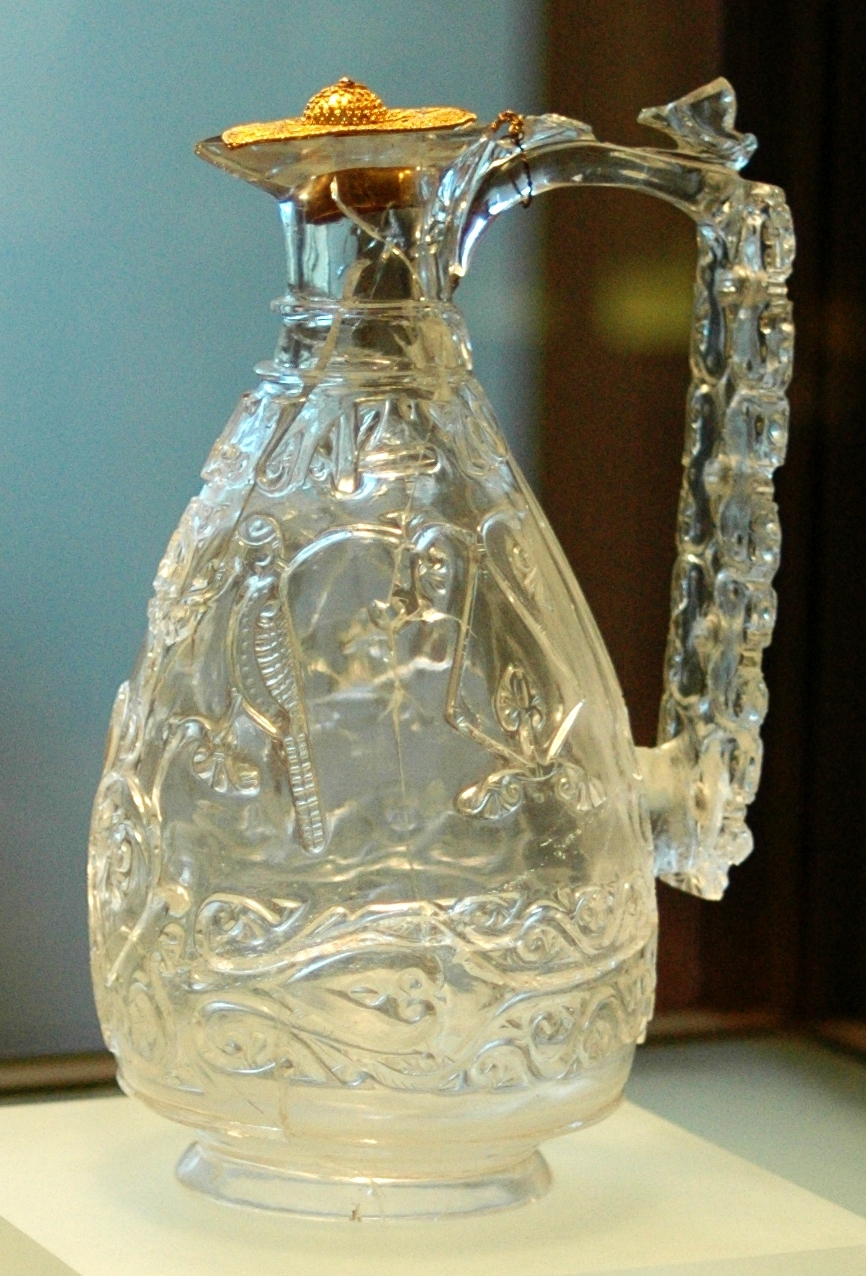
Ewer with birds

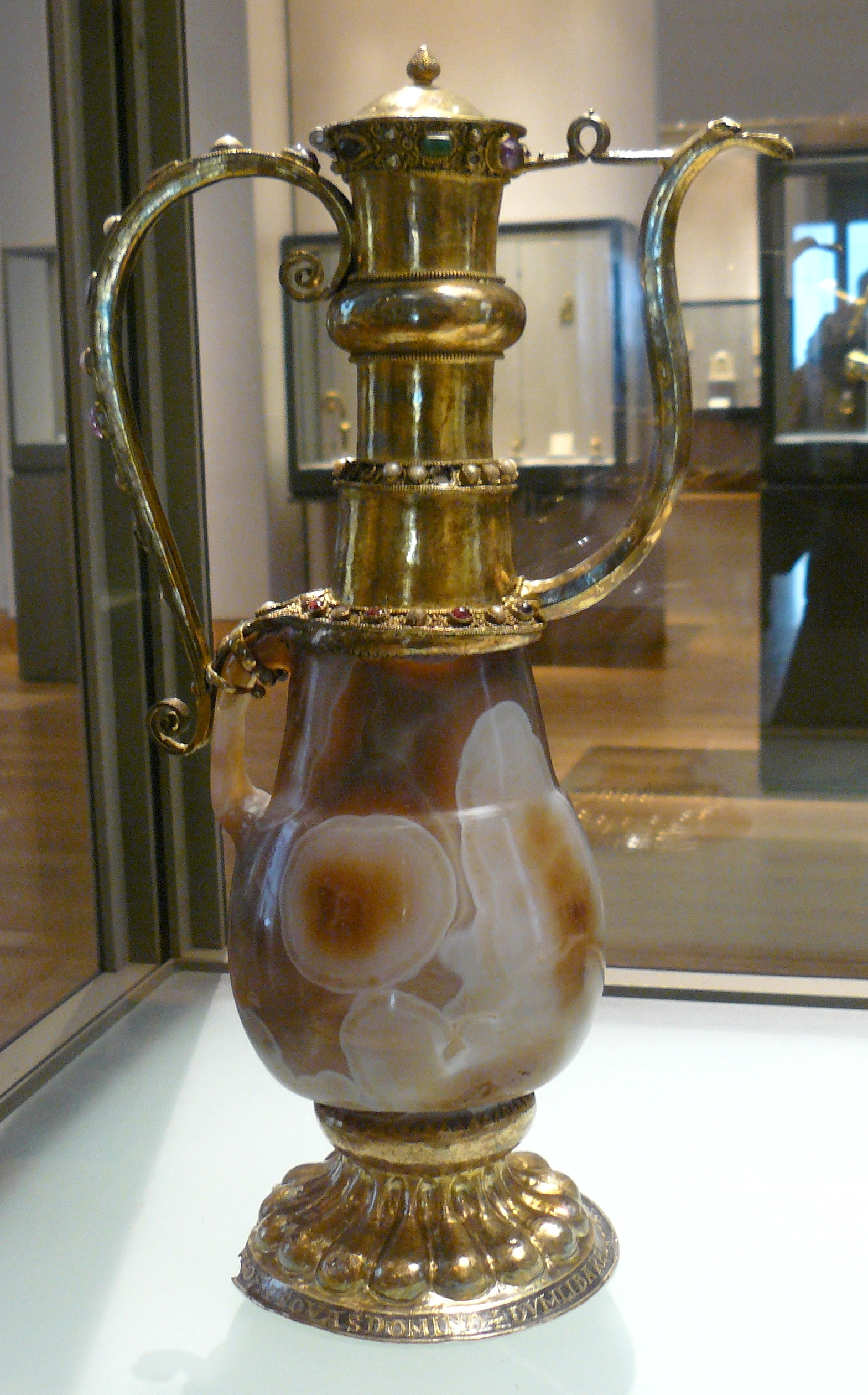
Sardonyx ewer

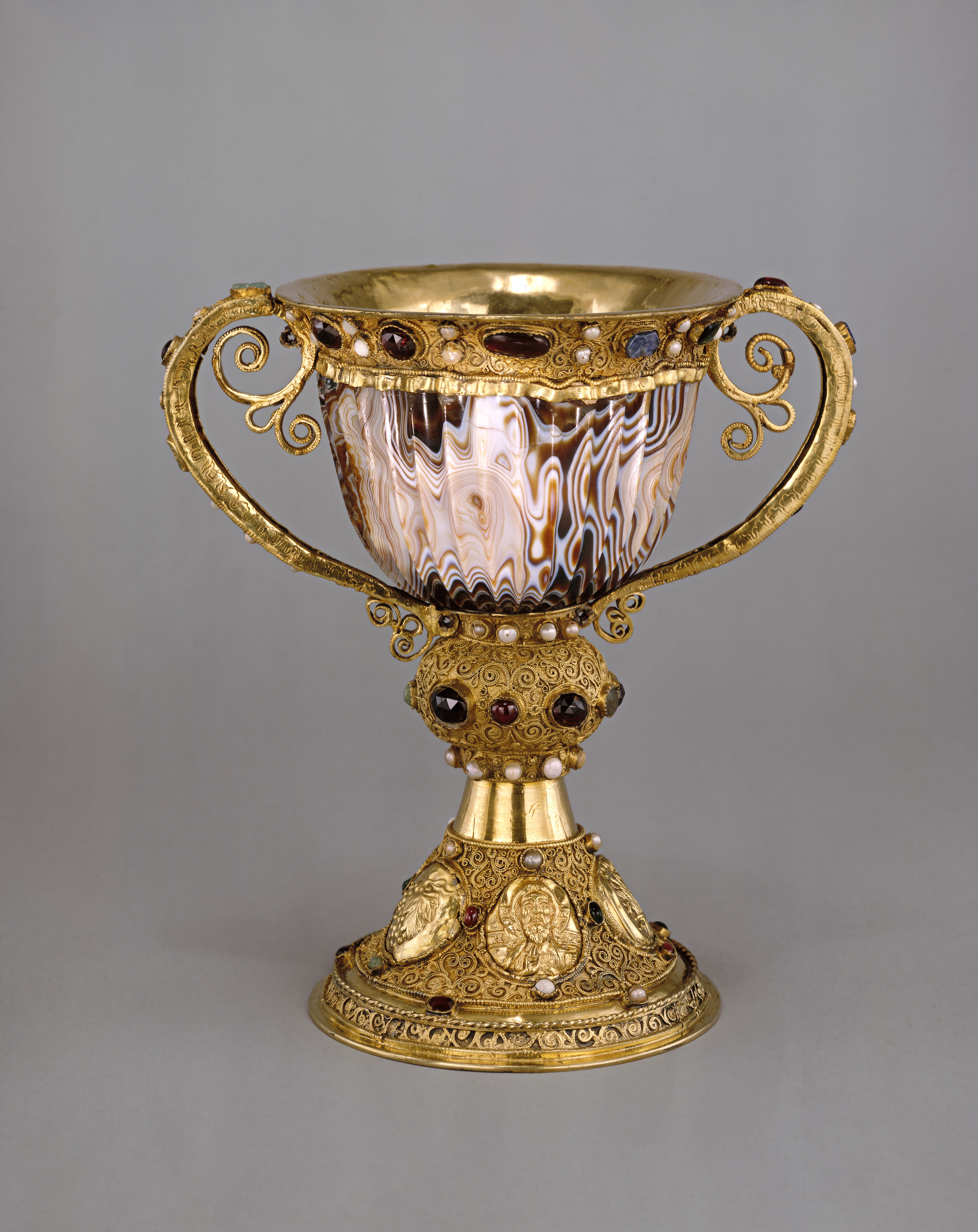
"Chalice of Suger"

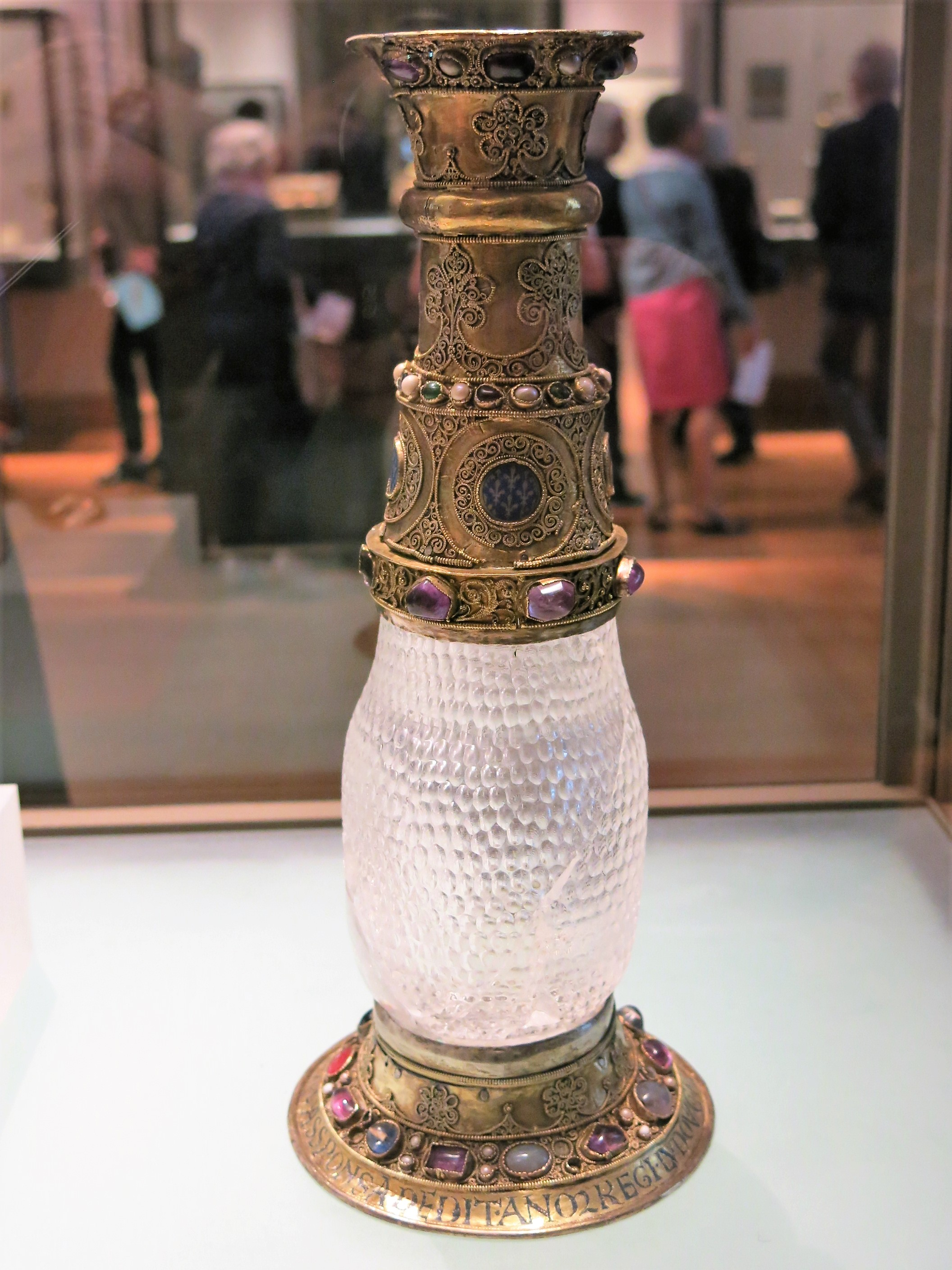
"Vase of Eleanor"

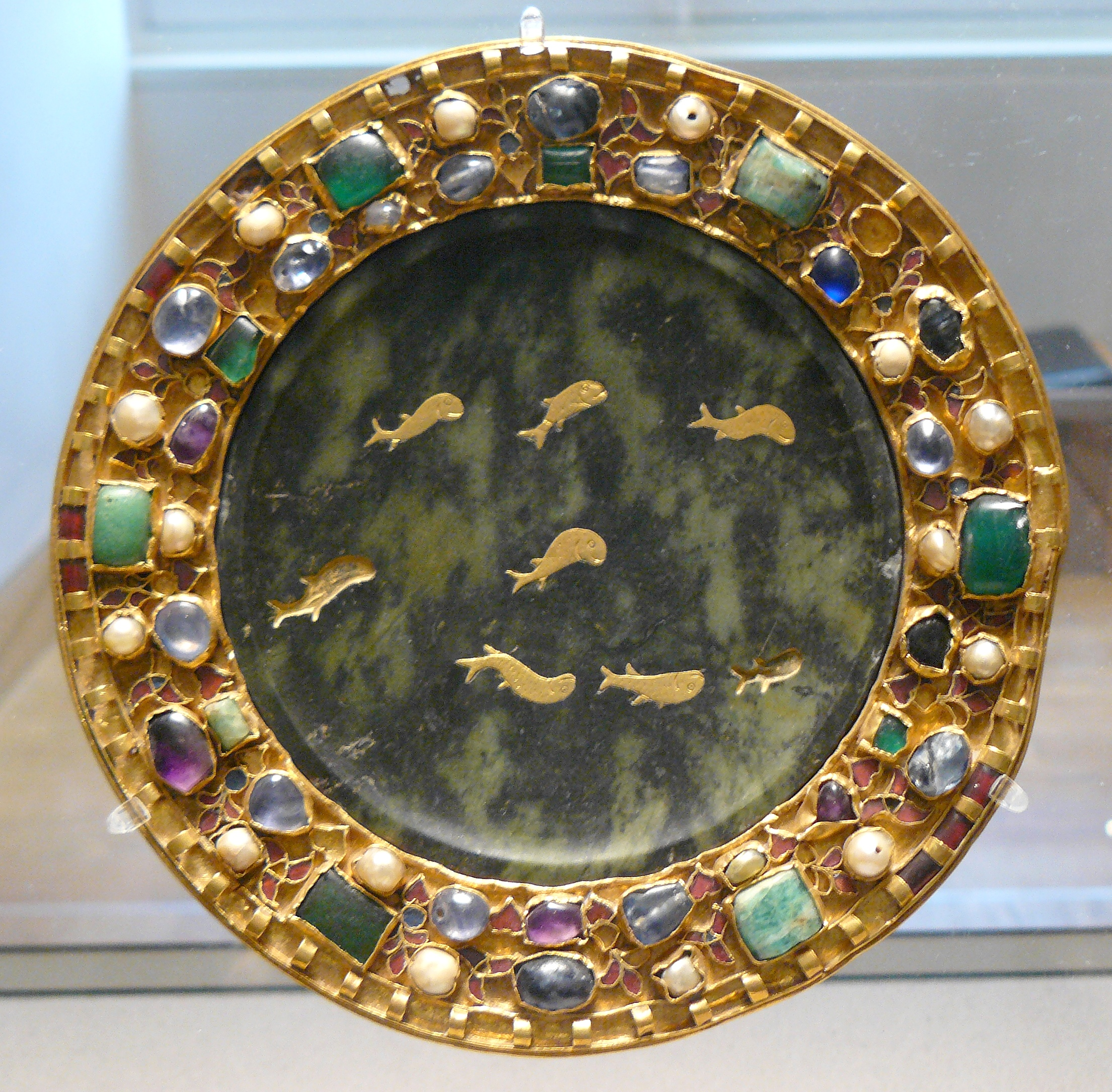
Paten of serpentine

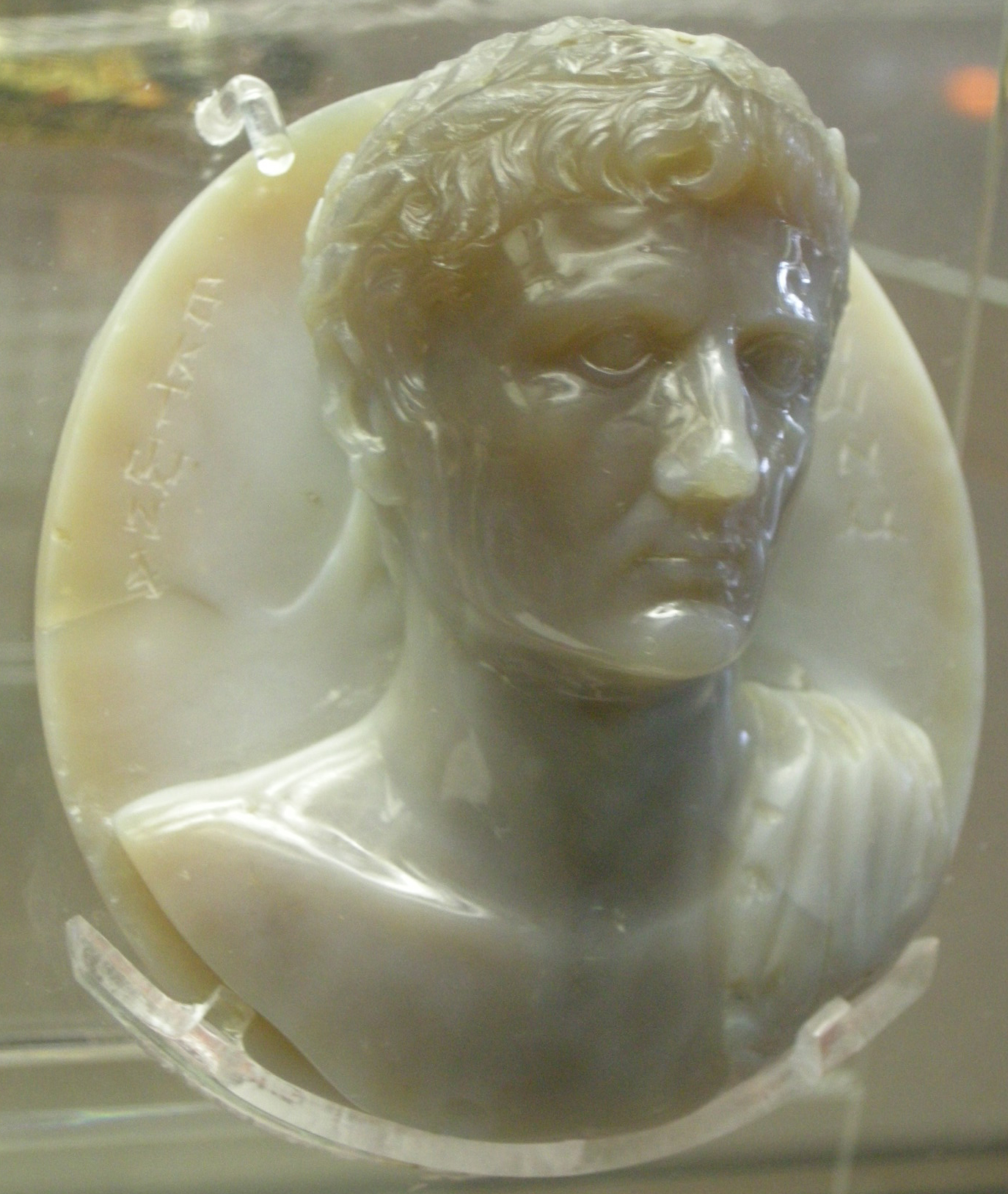
Chalcedony bust of Augustus

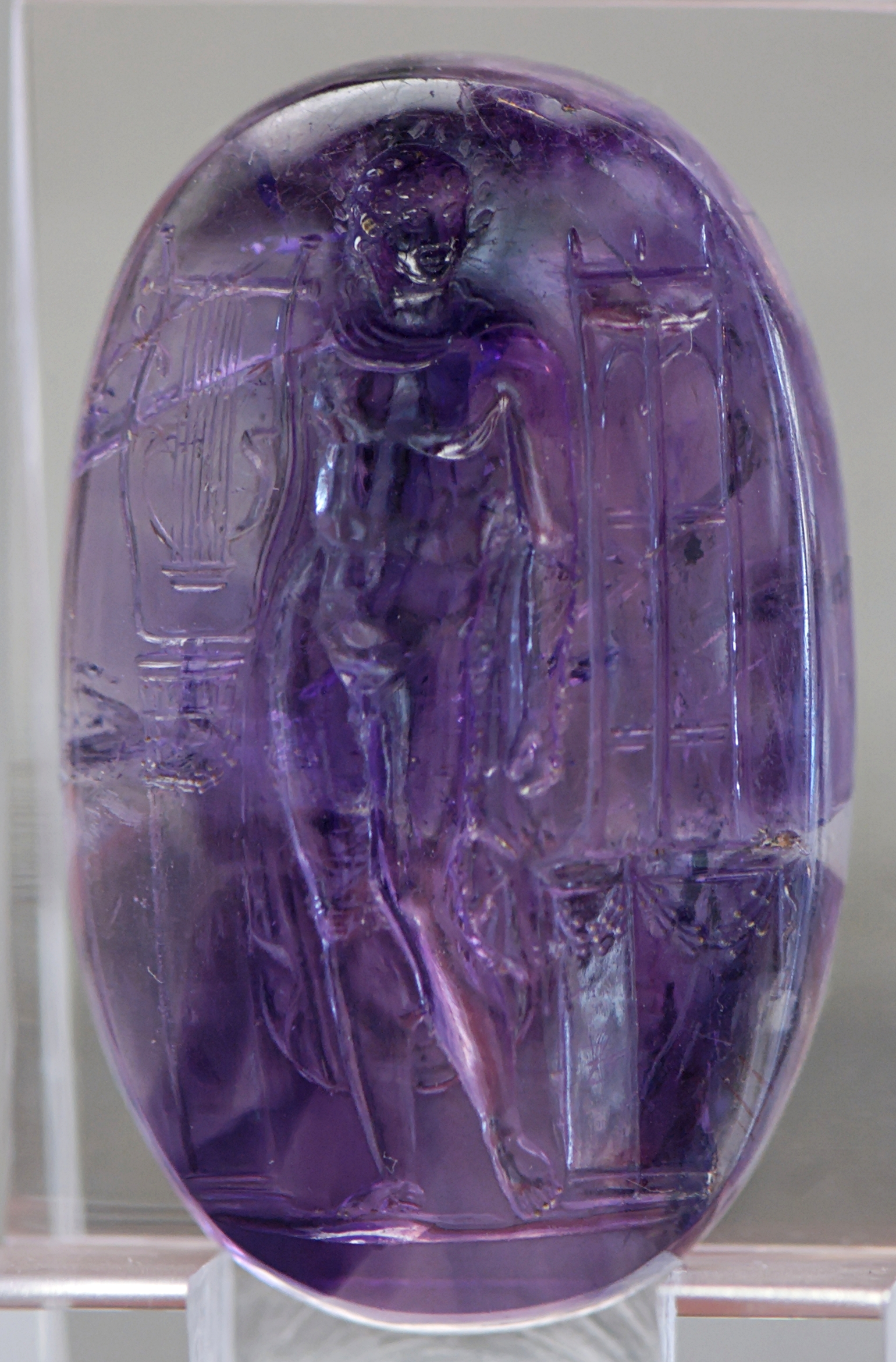
Gem of Nero

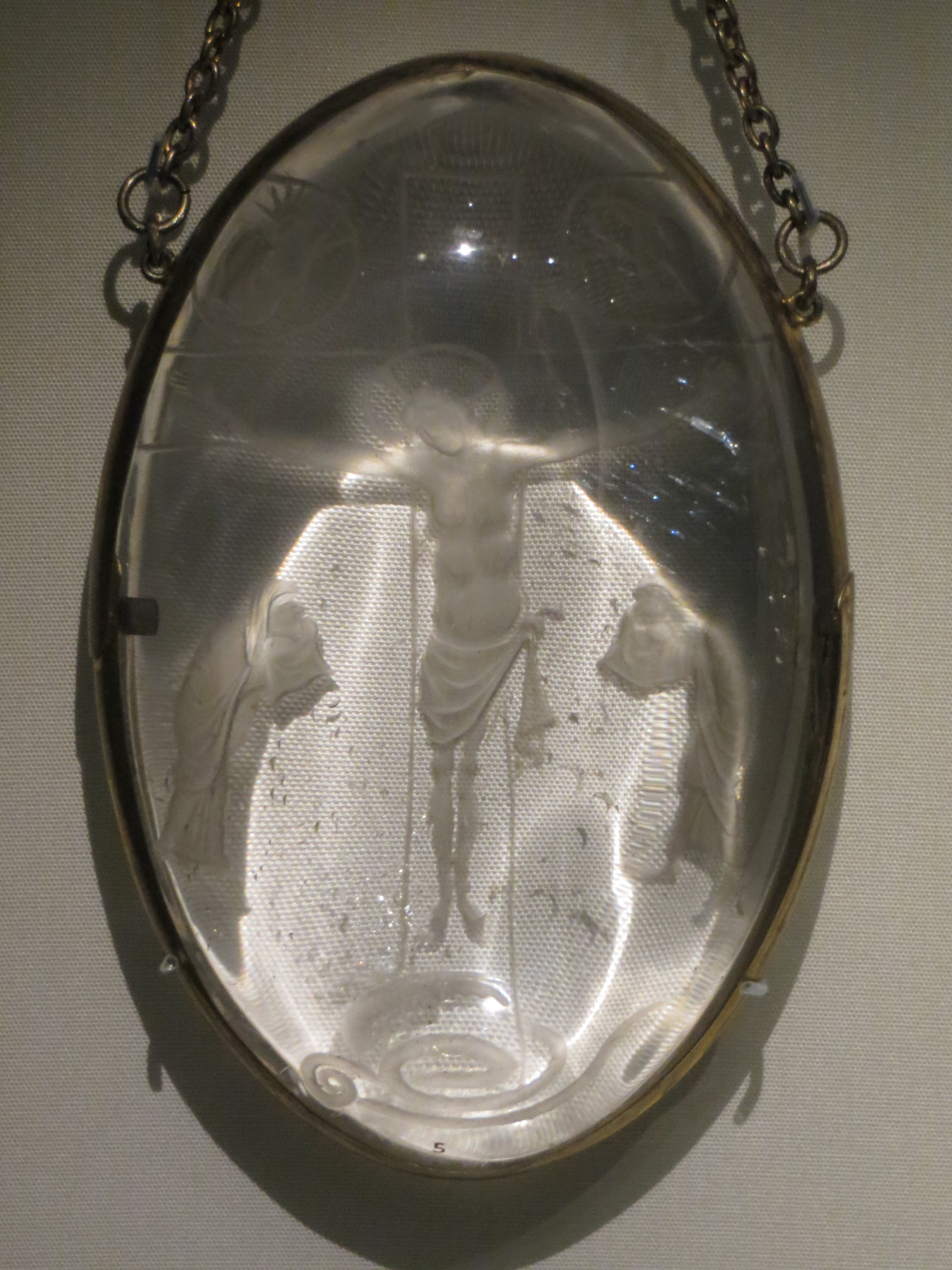
Saint-Denis Crystal

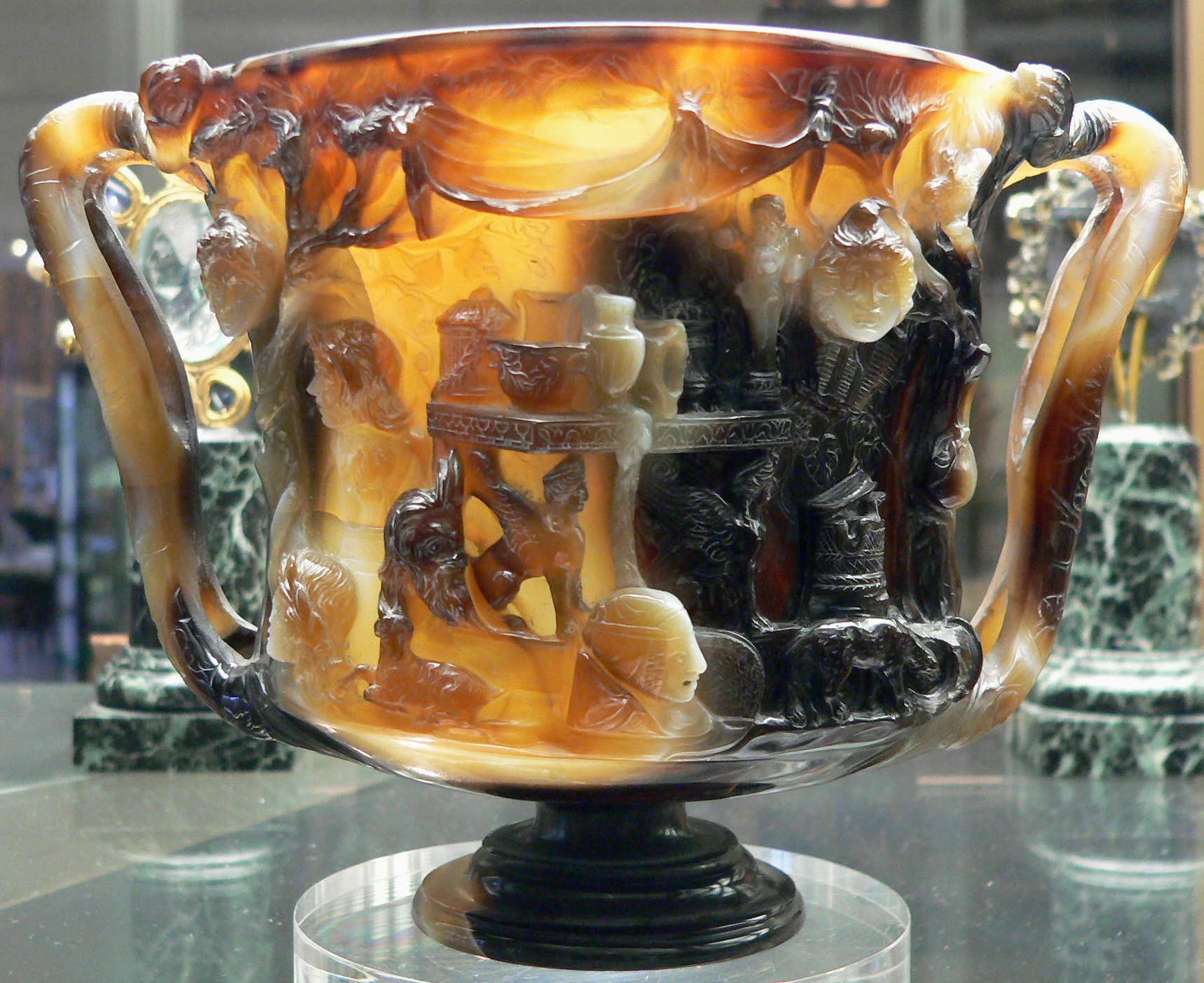
Cup of the Ptolemies

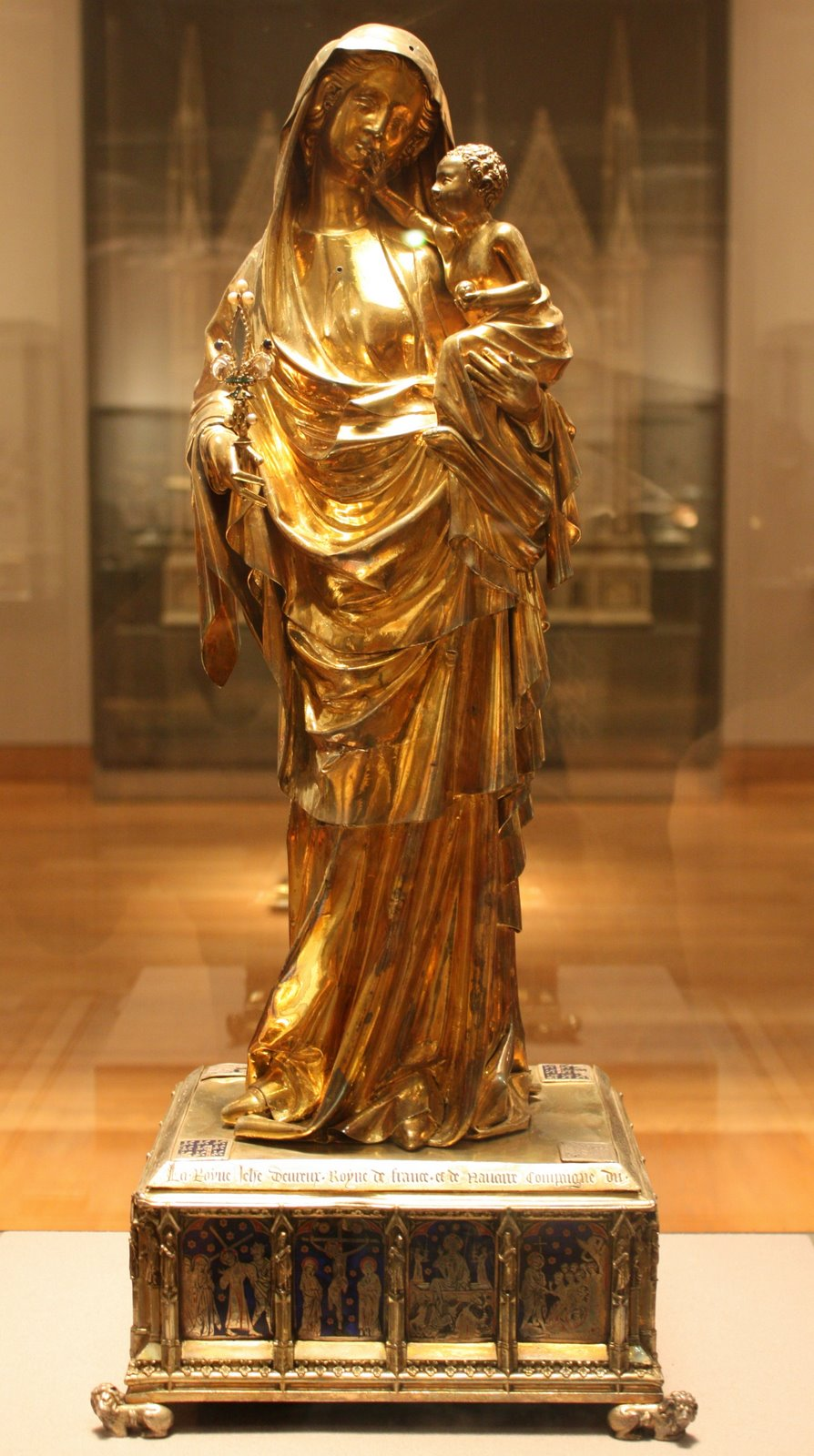
Virgin of Jeanne d'Evreux

== See also ==
- French Crown Jewels
- Imperial Regalia
- Virgin and Child from the Sainte-Chapelle
- Great Cameo of France
