= Cup of the Ptolemies =

Late Hellenistic or Roman onyx cameo cup

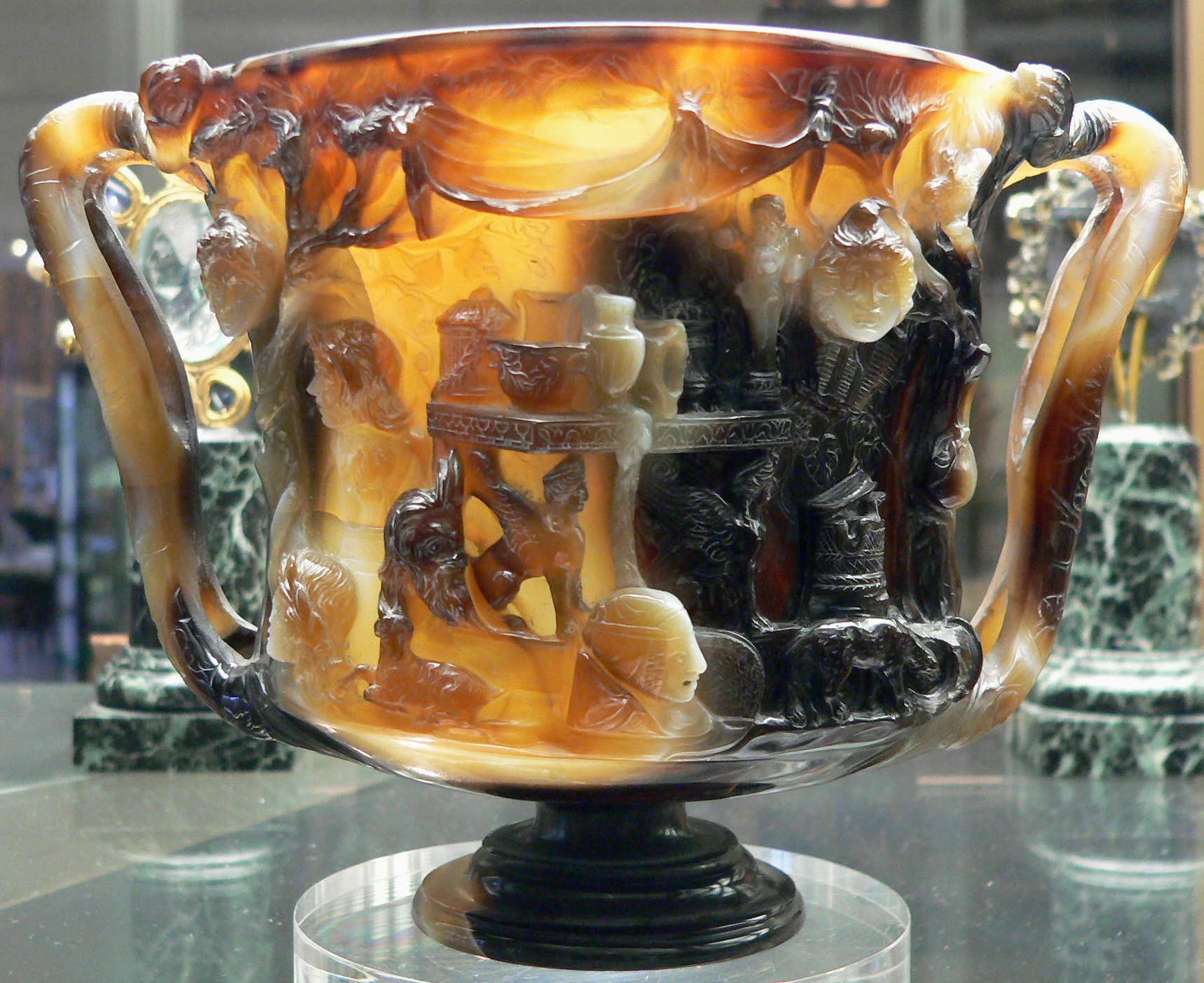
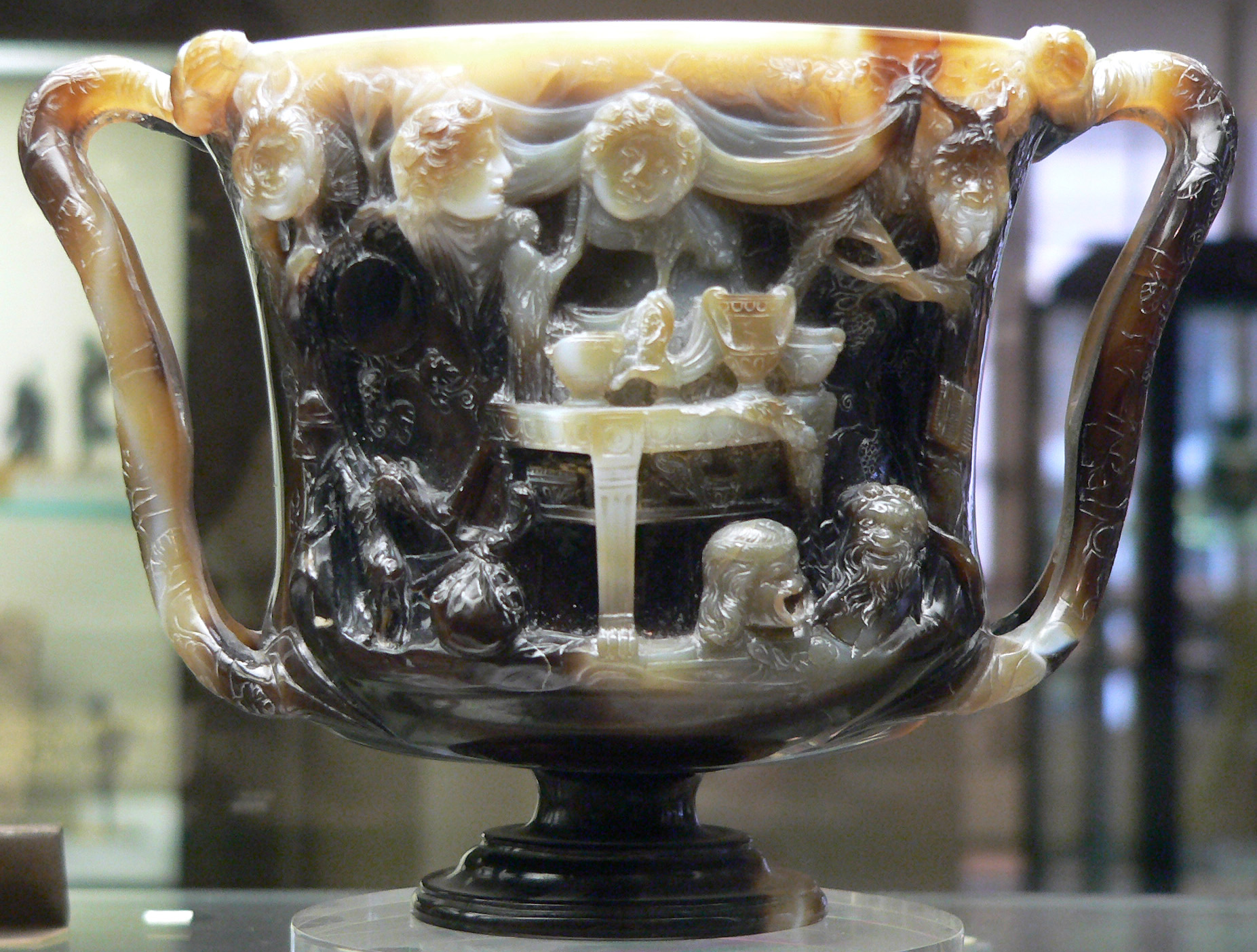
Front (top) and back (bottom) of the cup.

The Cup of the Ptolemies (French: Coupe des Ptolémées), also known as the Cup of Saint Denis, is an onyx cameo two-handled cup, or kantharos. It is 8.4 cm high, and 12.5 cm across.

The cup, decorated with Dionysiac vignettes and emblems, was carved at some point in Classical Antiquity, probably in Alexandria. Eventually, it found its way into the treasury of the French kingdom, before it was donated to the abbey of St. Denis. During the Middle Ages, it was used as a Christian chalice, and lavish mounts were added, with Latin inscriptions. In 1804, the cup was stolen, and the mounts were lost, although the cup itself was recovered. It is now in the Cabinet des Médailles at the Bibliothèque nationale de France, Paris.

== Description ==
The two-handled cameo cup, one of the acknowledged masterpieces among hardstone carvings of classical antiquity, (Note: Michel Félibien refers to it as "the most precious vase that is in the treasure of Saint-Denis, and perhaps in any European cabinet", and Martin Conway notes that it is "one of the greatest treasures in the Cabinet des Médailles".) was carved out of onyx and measures 8.4 cm high with a diameter of 12.5 cm. The cup is covered in Dionysiac vignettes that feature masks, vases, holy animals, and garland: symbols of the cult itself.

What is today considered the front of the vessel depicts six masks surrounding an anclabris. The anclabris is depicted as if it were made out of marble, and two sphinxes—beings that serve as allegorical representations of the mysteries of the Dionysian religion—are supporting the table. On the anclabris stands a small statue of Hermes, next to which hangs a mask with pipes. Above this mask may very well be the raven of Apollo. On the left side of the table, a goat is seen resting on the ground, surrounded by the symbols of the cult. Finally, a wicker basket can be found to the right of the table, out of which a snake emerges; this basket motif is often found in Dionysian artwork, and seemingly was an object of great importance to the religion.

On the upper-left side of what is today considered the back of the vessel, the mask of Pan can be seen in the tree. Below, a goat is reaching for ripened grapes. Behind the goat lies fruit and a table, most likely an anclabris with five ceremonial vessels on top. On the left side of the table stands a small female figure, whose lit torches represent the festivities and the orgies associated with the cult's rites. Frédéric de Clarac argued that the statues could very well symbolize either Telete or Ceres, two deities often associated with Dionysus. Above the table is a tapestry and two bacchante masks. To the right, in an apple tree, another mask of Pan can be seen. Two more bacchante masks are present on the bottom, in front of the table.

It seems that the vessel's pagan origins were overlooked when it was converted into a Christian chalice during the Middle Ages. Classicist Erika Zwierlein-Diehl noted that many descriptions of the cup omitted the Dionysiac nature of the carvings and images, merely noting that the cup was engraved with "trees, heads, animals, and birds." This (possibly purposeful) loss of iconographic understanding, also referred to as "un-naming", seems to have been a way for pagan artifacts to be reused for Christian purposes.

== History ==
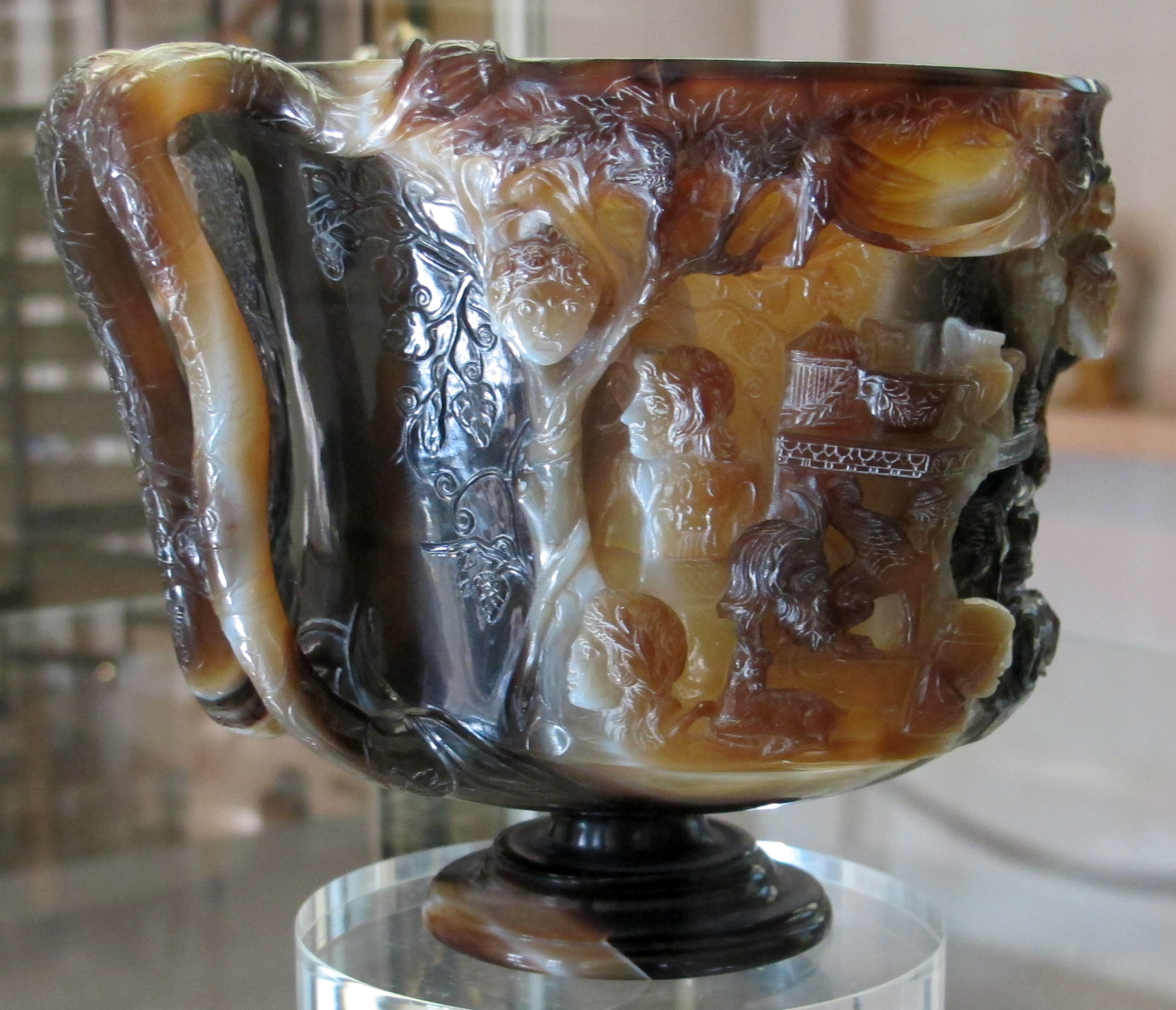
An oblique view of the front

The cup was probably made in Alexandria, Egypt. It was once thought to date back to the Hellenistic period, c. 250 BC, but is now regarded as dating to the 1st century AD. Its supposed connection with the Ptolemys dates back to 1644, when the historian Jean Tristan de Saint-Amant argued that the vase was made for the funeral processions of Ptolemy II Philadelphus, who ruled the Ptolemaic Kingdom of Egypt from 285 until 246 BC. Later, the scholar E. Babelon proposed the more general idea that the cup had been carved during "the time of the Ptolemies"—a wide range stretching from 305 to 30 BC. However, there is no particular evidence for this, and other scholars, such as John Henry Middleton or Martin Conway, suggest that the cup was carved later, during the first or second centuries AD by Romans. Determining the exact date of the cup has been problematic largely because similar pieces are rare, making any possible comparison difficult.

The exact history of the cup is largely unknown, although Conway suggests that the cup probably belonged to the Holy Roman Emperor Charlemagne before being passed down through the French kings, one of whom eventually donated it to the abbey of Saint Denis. The cup was occasionally used as a chalice for communion wine, and figured in the coronation of the French monarch, at which, according to S. G. Millet as quoted by Conway, the queens took "ablution from this chalice, after holy communion". In 1634, the cup was estimated to be worth around 25,000 livres, with the gem-encrusted gold mountings valued at 1,200 livres. Until September 1791 it formed part of the treasury of Saint-Denis. It was stolen in 1804, although it was later recovered missing its mounts when the thieves were caught in the Netherlands. The cup is now in the Cabinet des Médailles at the Bibliothèque nationale de France in Paris.

== Chalice mount ==
Engravings of the front and the back of the cup made for Michel Félibien in 1706, depicting the mounts and Latin inscriptions.

Sometime during the Carolingian period, a base "in the shape of a truncated cone" was constructed to make the vessel appear more like a traditional chalice, and the cup's knob was "partially covered with cloisonné goldsmith work". Later, in the 12th century, Abbot Suger of Saint Denis (who served from AD 1122–51) probably embellished the chalice, adding metalwork that widened its bottom. These mounts were made out of gold and were gem-studded. After the cup was recovered in the 19th century, it was missing its mounts, which were probably melted down for their precious materials. Today, the mounts are only known through an engraving by Michel Félibien that was made in 1706.

Suger also added a two-line Latin inscription on the chalice mount, known only from the engraving made by Félibien, which reads: hoc vas Xpe tibi [devota] mente dicavit tertius in Francos [sublimis] regmine Karlus. In English, this legend means: "The [exalted] Charles, third on the French throne, consecrated this vessel for you, Christ, with a [faithful] mind." (Note: In the 19th century, scholars suggested that words were missing from the lines, since the legend seems to be incomplete as it reads in the engravings. Visconti proposed the addition of the words "devota" and "sublimis", which are included in brackets.) Most scholars agree that this inscription links it to Charles the Bald, who ruled Western Francia from AD 840–77. Others think it refers to either the Charlemagne who ruled Francia from AD 768–814, or Charles the Simple who also ruled Western Francia from AD 919–23, although these suggestions seem unlikely. (Note: Conway argues that Suger was almost certainly referring to Charles the Bald: "Seeing that Suger himself in his own writings calls Charles the Bald Charles III, and as Charles the Bald gave many treasures of great value to St. Denis, whereas Charles the Simple is not otherwise known to have given any, it is practically certain that Charles the Bald was the donor.")

== See also ==
- Interpretatio Christiana, the adaptation of non-Christian elements of culture or historical facts to the worldview of Christianity
