= André Félibien =

French architecture writer (1619–1695)

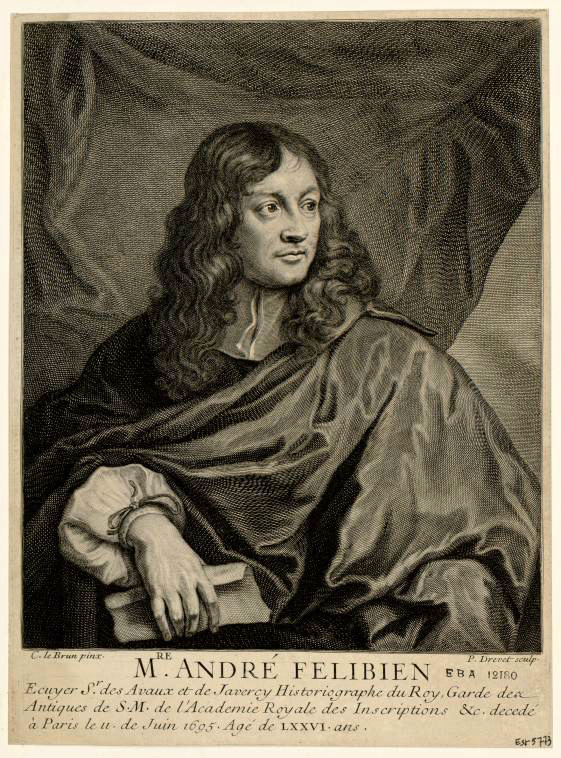
Engraving after a portrait by Charles Le Brun

André Félibien (May 1619 – 11 June 1695), sieur des Avaux et de Javercy, was a French chronicler of the arts and official court historian to King Louis XIV.

== Biography ==
Félibien was born at Chartres. At the age of fourteen he went to Paris to continue his studies; and in May 1647 he was sent to Rome in the capacity of secretary in the embassy of the marquis de Fontenay-Mareuil. His residence at Rome he turned to good account by diligent study of its ancient monuments, by examination of the literary treasures of its libraries, and by cultivating the acquaintance of men eminent in literature and in art, with whom he was brought into contact through his translation of Francesco Cardinal Barberini's Life of Pius V. Among his friends was Nicolas Poussin, whose counsels were of great value to him, and under whose guidance he even attempted to paint and whose biography Félibien wrote, which remains "the most persuasive guide to the work, as to the life" of Poussin, as the biography's modern editor Claire Pace observed.

On his return to France he immediately began working up his notes for the eight volumes of Entretiens he eventually published. He married and was ultimately induced, in the hope of employment and honors, to settle in Paris. Both Fouquet and Colbert in their turn recognized his abilities; he was one of the first members (1663) of the Academy of Inscriptions. Three years later Colbert procured him the appointment of court historian to the king, in which one of his commissions was the minute descriptions of court fêtes, an essential element of the king's cultural propaganda. In 1671 he was named secretary to the newly founded Académie royale d'architecture, where he gave lectures, and in 1673 he was appointed keeper of the cabinet of antiquities in the Palais Brion. His Description sommaire (1674) was the official guide to Versailles. To these offices was afterwards added by Louvois that of deputy controller-general of roads and bridges.

Félibien found time in the midst of his official duties for study and research, and produced many literary works. Among these the best and the most generally known is the Entretiens sur les vies et sur les ouvrages des plus excellents peintres anciens et modernes. That work was directly inspired by Giorgio Vasari's Lives of the Most Excellent Painters, Sculptors, and Architects (first edition, 1550; second edition, 1568). The Entretiens set the nascent discipline of art criticism on sound logical footings, which Félibien set forth most coherently in his Principes de l'architecture, de la sculpture, de la peinture, &c. (1676–1690). The Entretiens also served the purpose of advancing the reputations of French artists, sometimes at the expense of artists of other nationalities. An example of this is Félibien's condemnation of Giovanni Bazzi, also known as Il Sodoma, in the Entretiens' fourth volume (1672). Sodoma's mural painting of The Women of Darius' Family before Alexander the Great (c. 1517) was an uncomfortably close source of inspiration for Charles Le Brun's celebrated version of 1660–1661, about which Félibien composed a panegyric entitled Les Reines de Perse aux pieds d'Alexandre (1663). In his biography of "Le Sodoma" in the Entretiens, Félibien made no mention of Sodoma's earlier painting, but devoted the entire biography to a harsh critique of the artist's laziness and immorality, echoing earlier criticisms in Vasari's Lives (second edition, 1568).

Félibien wrote also L'Origine de la peinture (1660), and descriptions of Versailles, of La Trappe Abbey, and of the pictures and statues of the royal residences. He published a straightforward work of information, Des principes de l'architecture, de la sculpture, de la peinture... avec un dictionnaire des terms anonymously in Paris, 1676; in it H. W. van Helsdingen has detected that he made use of an unpublished work of critical Observations by Charles Alphonse du Fresnoy. Among other literary works, he edited the published Conferences of the Académie royale de peinture et de sculpture and translated the Castle of the Soul from the Spanish of St. Theresa. His personal character commanded the highest esteem, agreeing with the motto which he adopted - Bene facere et vera dicere, "Do well, and tell the truth". Félibien's codification of the aesthetic values of the classic arts in the hierarchy of genres is perhaps his most enduring legacy. André Félibien and Roger de Piles, author of Dialogue sur les coloris (Paris, 1673) "were and are the best-known writers on fine arts in seventeenth-century France". He died in Paris in 1695.

His son, Jean François Félibien (c. 1658–1733), was also an architect who left a number of works on his subject; and a younger son, Michel Félibien (c. 1666–1719), was a Benedictine monk of Saint-Germain-des-Prés whose fame rests on his history of the Abbey of Saint-Denis and also his L'Histoire de l'école de Paris in 5 vols., a work indispensable to the student of Paris.

Félibien's diaries are among the bound volumes of his papers conserved in the public library of his birthplace, Chartres. The only recent work wholly devoted to Félibien is Stefan Germer, Kunst, Macht, Diskurs. Die intellektuelle Karriere des André Félibien im Frankreich von Louis XIV (Munich), 1997; it supplants the brief report in A. Fontaine, Les doctrines d'art en France (Paris) 1909:41ff.

== Art ==
In 1667 Félibien stated the following views on the hierarchy of genres:

"He who makes perfect landscapes is above another who only paints fruit, flowers, or seashells. He who paints living animals is worthier of estimation than those who paint only things that are dead and without movement. And as the figure of man is the most perfect work of God on earth, it is also certain that he who becomes an imitator of God by painting human figures is much more excellent than all the others. However, even though it is no small thing to make the figure of a man appear as if alive, and to give the appearance of movement to that which has none, nevertheless a painter who only makes portraits...may not pretend to the honor accorded to the most learned. For that, it is necessary to progress from the single figure to the representation of several together, to depict history and myth...the virtue of great men and the most elevated mysteries".
