= Saint-Denis Crystal =

Carolingian engraved gem

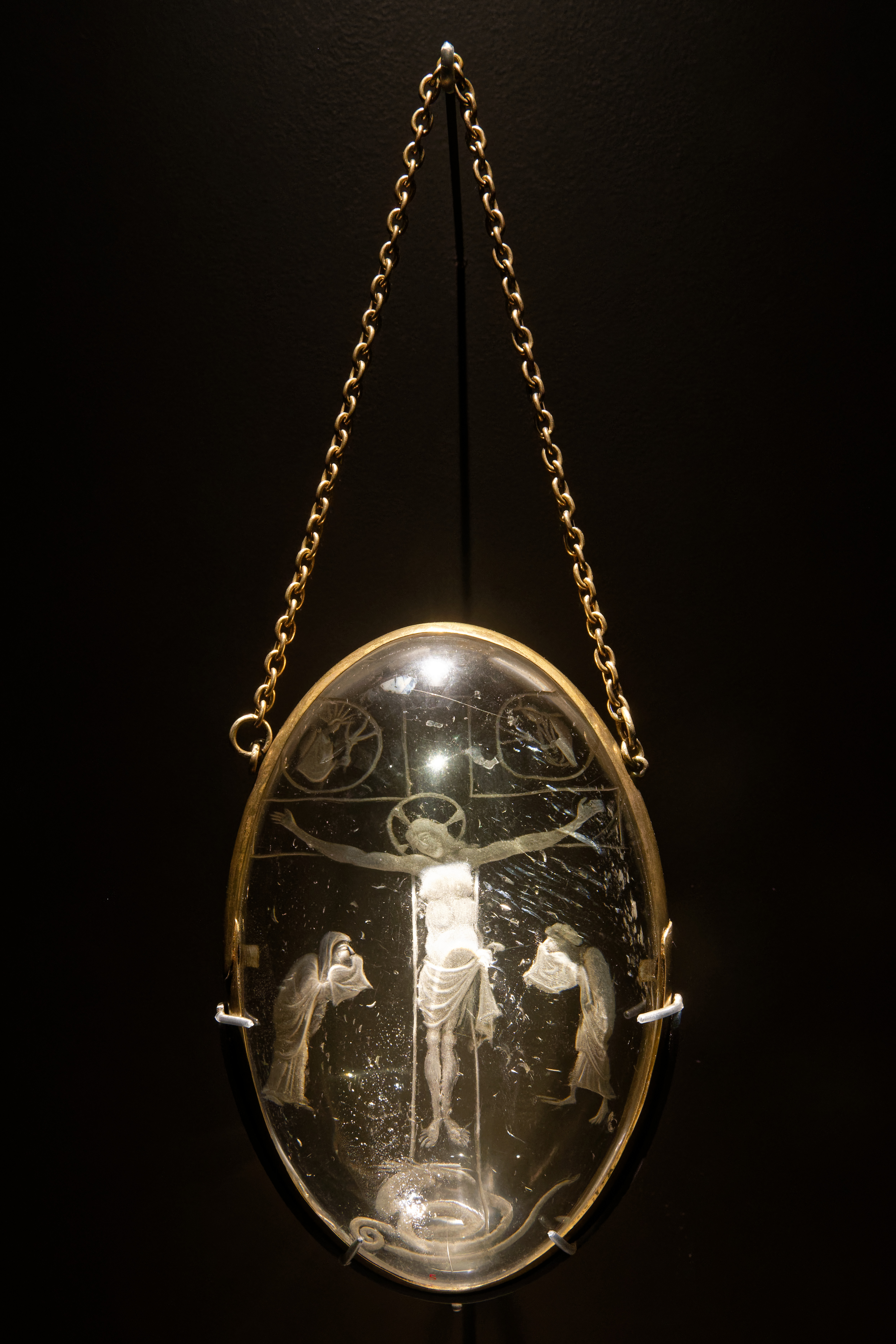
- Material: Quartz; Gilt Metal (frame)
- Size: Length 15.5cm Weight 1.08 kg
- Period/culture: Carolingian (crystal), Medieval (frame)
- Place: London
- Present location: British Museum
- Identification: 1855,0305.1;

The Saint-Denis Crystal or Cristal de Saint-Denis is a Carolingian engraved gem depicting the crucifixion of Christ, that was originally held in the treasury of the Abbey of Saint-Denis in France. During the French Revolution many pieces in the Abbey's treasure were either broken up and destroyed or sold - the Saint Denis Crystal eventually made its way to the British Museum in London, where it resides to this day.

== Description ==
The Saint-Denis Crystal is one of 20 or so engraved intaglios of rock crystal to survive from the Middle Ages. On the flat surface of the crystal is engraved the crucifixion of Christ, who is flanked by the Virgin Mary and Saint John who are holding cloths to their faces in expressions of grief. Above this scene are two images of the moon and the sun.

== History ==
Estimated to date between 846 and 869 AD, the crystal was clearly made for an important client from the Carolingian court. For a long time, it was kept in the treasury of the Abbey of Saint-Denis, where almost all the monarchs of France are buried. Following the French Revolution the crystal was sold at auction in 1798 and, after going through various hands, was purchased by the British Museum in 1855.

== See also ==
- Lothair Crystal, another engraved gem also in the British Museum
