= Virgin of Jeanne d'Evreux =

Gothic sculpture

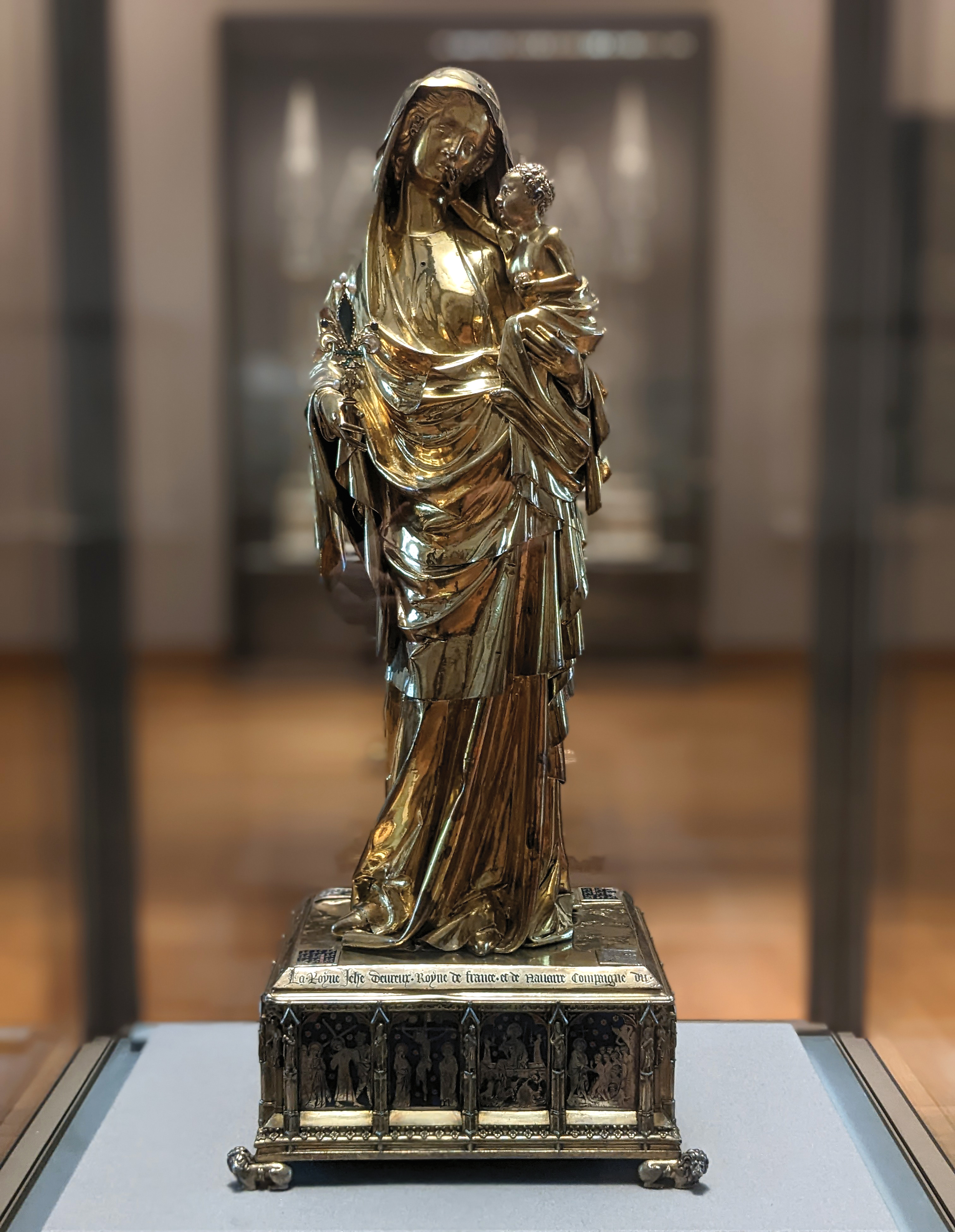
Virgin and Child of Jeanne d'Evreux

The Virgin of Jeanne d'Evreux, is a Gothic sculpture created sometime between the years 1324 and 1339. This figure stands at 68 cm tall and is made from gilded silver, stones, pearls, and the earliest dated French translucent enamels. The piece itself was donated to the abbey of Saint-Denis by Jeanne d'Evreux in 1339 as inscribed in the pedestal. Currently, this sculpture is on display within the Louvre in France.

== The owner and patron ==
Jeanne d'Évreux was born in 1310 in the town of Évreux, France. Her parents were Count Louis of Évreux and Marquerite d'Artois and also was the great-granddaughter of King Louis the IX who ruled in France in 1226 until his death. She married Charles IV on July 5, 1324, who was the son of Philip IV and Queen Jeanne de Navarre. The time she spent with her husband was relatively short and became widowed only after four years of marriage. However, during this time, King Charles commissioned the manuscript known as The Book of Hours of Jeanne d'Evreux as a gift to his wife. During the time of their marriage, Jeanne never bore any male heir.

== Art Historical Context ==
In the 13th century, the Gothic style of art, including beautiful Madonnas, began to emerge and spread throughout all of Europe. While Romanesque art had often used abstract images to convey complicated concepts, in later medieval Europe, artists increasingly focused on visually reproducing aspects of the world around them, embracing realism and naturalism, as can be seen in the proportions of figural works, and the details used to characterize humans, other animals, and plants. Greater interest was shown in displaying emotions that viewers might relate to, often expressed through gestures and facial expressions.

Many of the sculptures created in this time period were owned by wealthy individuals and used for private, devotional practice, or were donations for churches and abbeys. Sculptures of the Virgin Mary alone or with Christ as a child were widely popular in this period, and were created in a variety of materials.

This piece, like Jeanne's book of hours, has been associated with the artist Jean Pucelle. The piece itself seems to have been intended for Jeanne d'Évreux just as The Book of Hours of Jeanne d'Évreux which was given to her by her husband. Jeanne would have used this sculpture within her personal devotional practice.

== The Virgin and Child ==
The sculpture depicts the Virgin Mary holding Christ as a baby in her arms. The pose fashioned here uses the Byzantine "virgin of tenderness" iconography. The Virgin and the Child of Jeanne d'Évreux was created in the Gothic period in Europe, when images of the Virgin and Child increasingly focused on the relationship between mother and baby, presenting figures and relationships that viewers might relate to, rather than the authoritative, stately, and highly conception images of the so-called "Throne of Wisdom". Mary's facial expressions are very compassionate and loving with Christ gently touching his mother's face.

The base of the sculpture has three separate buttresses separating different scenes of Christ as a teacher and the Passion of Christ with his crucifixion. These scenes are drawn on a dark blue background with colours of emerald green, yellow and red on gilded silver with the figures painted in a golden colour. The base is supported at the bottom by four miniature lions bearing the weight of the sculpture. In the right hand of the Virgin Mary, she is holding a sceptre with the fleur-de-lis with precious stones decorating it. The symbol of the fleur-de-lis is often used to represent the French monarchy. In a more religious context, the fleur-de-lis is often associated with the Holy Trinity (the Father, the Son, and the Holy Spirit) or the Virgin Mary because it can also represent pureness and chastity. The use of the symbol on sceptres establishes that the figure is Saint-like or holy.

Similar works of art would include pieces such as The Virgin of Paris — a late Gothic sculpture that dates in the early 14th century. This statue is found in a similar posture as The Virgin and Child but the clothing is somewhat different. Mary is dressed in a gown, holding a sceptre in the right hand and is also wearing a crown which represents her as the queen of Heaven. Christ is no longer touching the face of his mother but is holding onto a piece of her clothing as well as a round ball. This sphere represents the Earth and how Christ is its ruler. This piece was commissioned for the Cathedral of Notre Dame in Paris.

Other similar pieces include the Byzantine styled icon known as the Mother of God of Tenderness (Virgin of Tenderness), and the Mother of God of Vladimir. Both of these pieces are icons of the Virgin Mary holding Christ as a child with their cheeks touching as they embrace.

== See also ==
- Treasury of Saint-Denis

== Bibliography ==
- mfresnillo. "Gothic Sculpture." Upload & Share PowerPoint presentations and documents. http://www.slideshare.net/mfresnillo/gothic-sculpture (accessed March 15, 2012).
