= Guy Alexis Lobineau =

Breton historian and monk (1666–1727)

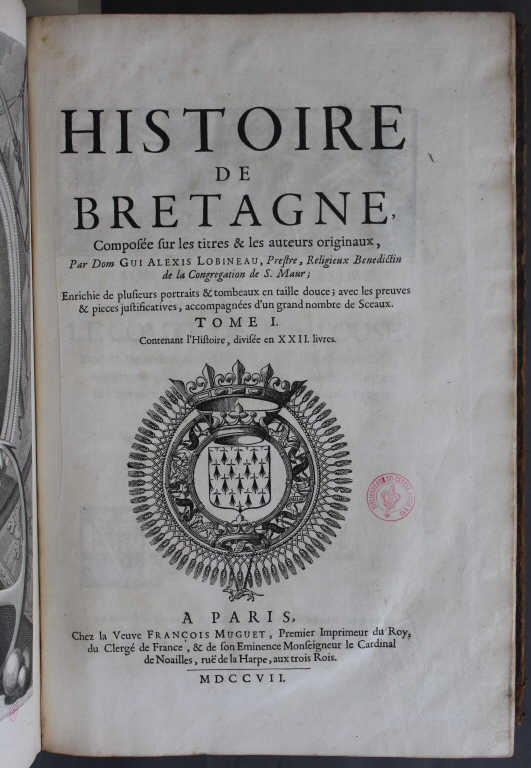
History of Brittany, by Dom Lobineau

Guy Alexis Lobineau (1666–1727), better known as Dom Lobineau, was a Breton historian and Benedictine monk. He is best known for his history of Brittany, Histoire de Bretagne (1707). He also expanded and completed Michel Félibien's five-volume Histoire de la ville de Paris (1725), after the latter's death in 1719.
