= Suger's Eagle =

Ancient Egyptian vase

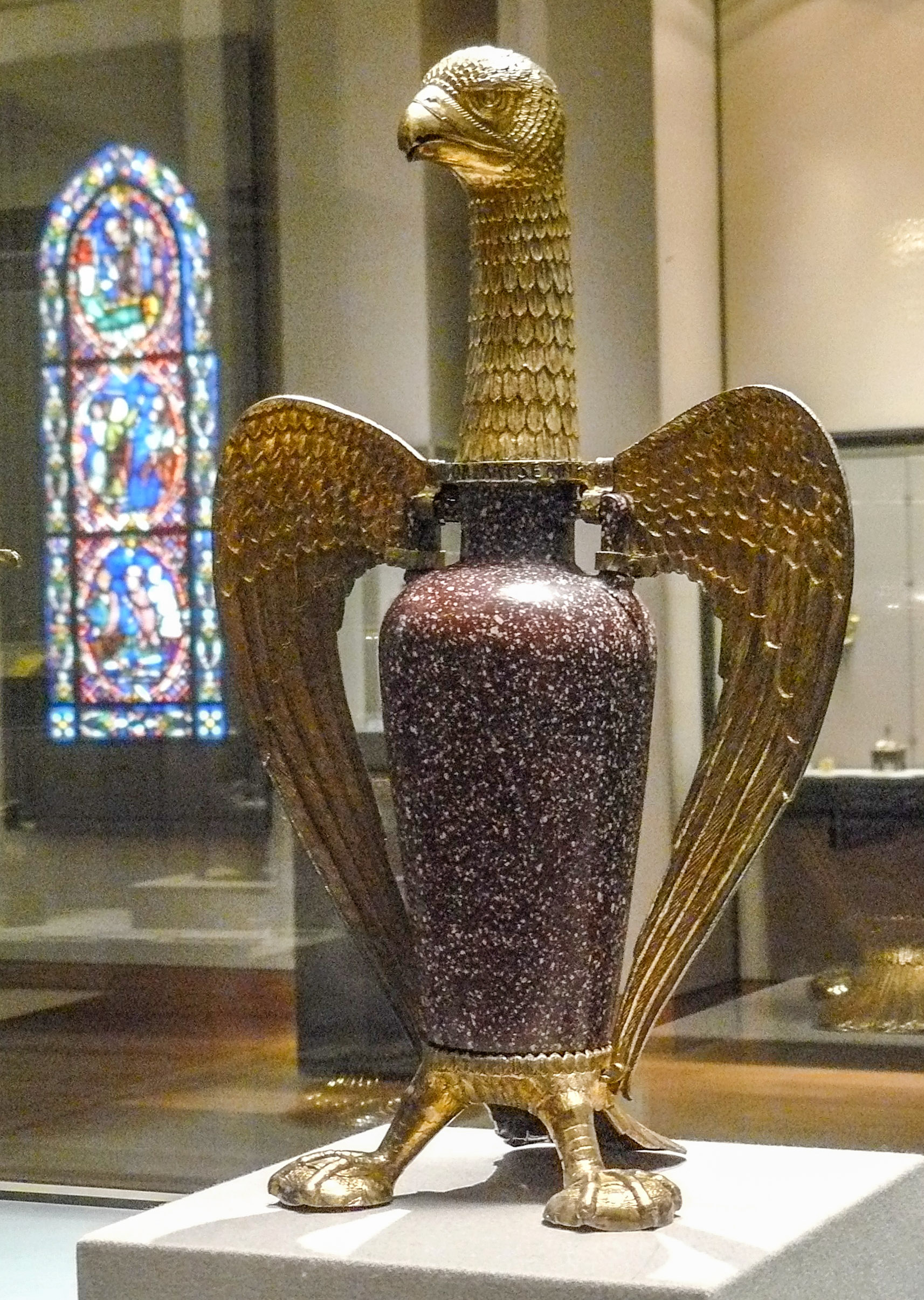
- Aigle de Suger Suger's Eagle (Aigle de Suger), made with red porphyry niello, gold, and mounted in a medieval silver-gilt eagle.
- Pre ca. 1122
- Commissioned by Abbot Suger

Suger's Eagle (Aigle de Suger) is an ancient Egyptian porphyry vase made with niello, gold, and mounted in a medieval silver-gilt eagle. The vase is a medieval spolia piece and is displayed along with the French regalia in the Galerie d'Apollon at the Louvre in Paris.

Abbot Suger (about 1081–1151) was a collector and patron of many art pieces, and Suger's Eagle is one of three vases that he owned. The other two are the Aiguière de sardoine du trésor de Saint-Denis (the Ardonyx Ewer), and the Vase d'Aliénor d'Aquitaine (the Eleanor Vase), both of which were part of a large collection of art pieces owned and commissioned by Suger. These vases are also on display alongside Suger's Eagle at the Louvre.

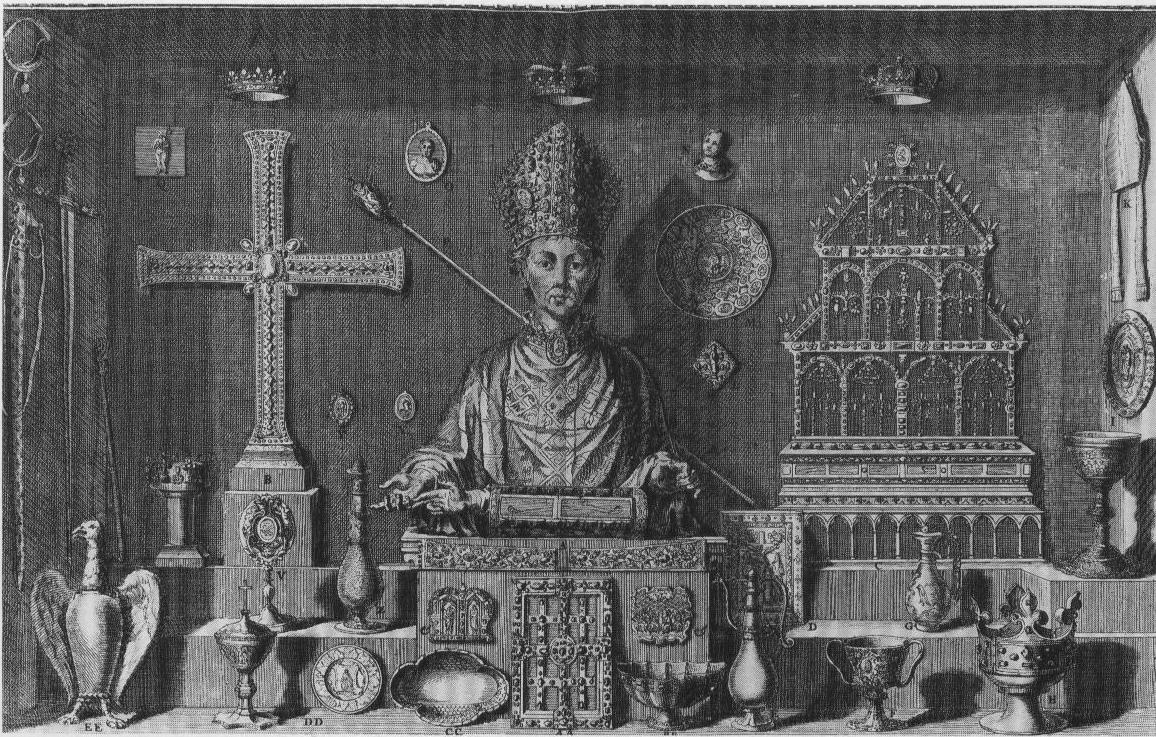
Dom Félibien 1706 trésor de St-Denis

== Symbolism ==
The vase takes the form of an eagle, a metaphor for Jesus Christ that served as a symbol of Christianity after Rome transitioned from the practice of pagan beliefs. The eagle is known as a symbol of Christ partly due to Aristotle's comments on eagles and their abilities to look into the sun. These observations were then compared to biblical stories of Jesus Christ, linking the image of Christ ascending into Heaven to meet God to that of an eagle's flight while looking at the sun.

Another interpretation is that Abbot Suger chose an eagle as the main visual in order to give the vase the spirit of an eagle. Suger may have gotten this idea from King Maroboduus (Marbod), who, like him, believed he could bestow an animal's spirit into a vase, in his case, one made of sapphire. Marbod was also recorded as associating inanimate objects with living creatures, similarly to how Suger associated his vase with an eagle. This was claimed to be done as a way to give the object more life.

== Dating and original location ==
=== Saint-Denis ===
The vase likely dates to the second century AD. According to Abbot Suger, abbot of Saint-Denis, in his De administratione, he found, "lying idly in a chest for many years, an Egyptian porphyry vase admirably shaped and polished." In his own words, he determined to adapt and transfer (adaptavimus ... transferre) it into a liturgical vessel "in the form of an eagle" (in aquilae formam), a symbol of Christ. Suger's Eagle exemplifies the preservation of an ancient relic that has fully maintained its original integrity.

Two large engravings from 1706 depict the treasury of Saint-Denis (including the eagle vase) as it was then displayed, in a cabinet. Its popularity as a tourist attraction prevented the treasure's total destruction during the French Revolution.The eagle and three of Suger's other liturgical vessels—Queen Eleanor's vase and King Roger's decanter, both of rock crystal, and a sardonyx ewer—ended up in the Galerie d'Apollon at the Louvre.

== Attributions ==
=== Abbot Suger ===
Abbot Suger was responsible for the commissioning of Suger's Eagle and saw that it was transformed and created by artists at his request. Suger himself had a desire to collect and commission beautiful works of art, as he had an appreciation for beautiful and intricate things. Furthermore, Suger thought that by commissioning and keeping a collection of pristine artworks, such as Suger's Eagle, that he would be honoring God, and what is now the Saint-Denis Cathedral. As head of the monastery of Saint-Denis, Suger's goal was to create a place of beauty and worship that was worthy of god, using the art that he collected to place value and to create an extravagant place to practice religion.

== Description ==
=== Physical features ===
While Suger's Eagle was referenced as depicting an eagle, even by Suger himself, the animal that the vase takes the shape of is actually closer to resembling a hawk or a falcon. A few of the features of the bird carved into Suger's Eagle that point to this include the shape of the bird's beak, its nostrils, and wings. Eagles, while similar in appearance to hawks and falcons, do not have curved beaks or nostrils, and their wings take on a different shape than the one that is depicted on Suger's Eagle. This is not to say that the vase does not include eagle-like features. The neck of the bird as well as the legs and tail all resemble an eagle's anatomy, and can be argued in favor of the vase's title. However, upon closer inspection, it can be assumed that the bird on Suger's Eagle was modeled after a Raptor, which is another large bird of prey. This category of birds includes hawks, eagles, falcons, and raptors, which were commonly found during the time period in which Suger's Eagle would have been commissioned. Though it is likely for the Raptor to be the cause for the bird's mismatched features, the bird that is carved in the vase is still referred to as an eagle.

=== Spolia ===
Sugar's Eagle is an example of a medieval art piece that uses what is known as spolia. Spolia uses materials from older objects and artworks to create something that is brand new. What makes Sugar's Eagle a use of spolia is that the piece was originally a vase, more specifically a type of vase called an amphora. The vase was repurposed and still remains a part of Suger's Eagle, now serving as the body of the bird. What is left of the eagle, the head, feet, and wings, are made up of other materials that were added to the amphora, including gold (or gilt silver), red porphyry, and niello. Because the vase was repurposed, it is also a form of interpretatio christiana, which refers to the transformation of pagan materials into a Christian context, such as Suger's Eagle.

=== Materials ===
Suger's Eagle is gold and deep red in color, with the body of the eagle being represented by the vase itself. This vase was crafted out of a few different materials, including Ancient red porphyry, gilt silver, and niello. Gilt silver is silver that has been coated in a layer of gold, and niello is an alloy with a black metallic color to it, often used decoratively on metal surfaces with materials such as lead or silver. The vase stands at about 17 x 11 inches and includes intricate stone and metal work. This can be located in the gold and silver gilt at the base of the eagle's neck, or at the mouth of the vase.

At the bottom of the eagle is a nielloed titulus: "This stone deserves to have mounts of gold and gems. / It was marble. Its settings are more precious than marble." Inscribed around the base of the neck, above the lip of the vessel, is a dedication to the church of Saint-Denis. The goldwork of the neck demonstrates superb chiselwork.

==== Red Porphyry ====
Red Porphyry is a type of igneous rock that is used in the amphora of Suger's Eagle. Originating from Ancient Greece, red porphyry is known for its spotted texture and reddish, purple coloring. These features can be seen on the body of the eagle, where the minerals in the porphyry cause a speckled texture. Red porphyry is commonly used for decoritive purpose and was popular in Rome more so than anywhere else, the Romans importing it in mass quantities to use for things like tile, columns, sculptures, and vases, such as Suger's Eagle.

The reason for the popularity of red porphyry in Rome was highly due to its association with royalty and imperial power. The reason this rock was so popular amongst royalty in Rome, was that it stemmed from another popular Roman connection to royalty. Shellfish produce a purple dye, known as tyrian, which, in Rome, was used on the clothing of superior Roman classes. The color of red porphyry resembled this color enough to gain popularity amongst the royals, serving as a way to show status and power through design. This may have had influence on why red pophyry was included in Suger's Eagle, as the vase was made to be worthy of God.

Red porphyry is still most commonly associated with, and found in Rome. The many works that were made for Roman royalty have become a part of a large collection of red porphyry pieces, which have been found and preserved over time.
