= Scepter of Dagobert =

Scepter of the French Crown Jewels

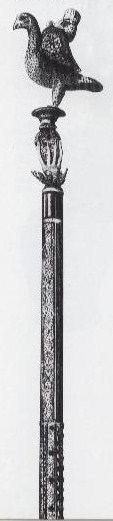
The Sceptre of Dagobert.

Originally part of the French Crown Jewels, sometimes considered its oldest part, and dating from the 7th century, the scepter of Dagobert was stored in the treasure of the Basilica of Saint-Denis (also known as Basilique royale de Saint-Denis) until 1795, when it disappeared, stolen in the basilica and never seen again.

Its name comes from Dagobert I (629–639), the French king for whom it was supposedly created by master goldsmith Éloi de Noyon, better known as Saint Eligius.

== Description ==
Made of filigraned and enameled gold, the scepter was 56 cm long. It was made out of three parts, the rod, the hand holding the world and a statue at the top, the oldest part of the scepter.

== See also ==
- List of missing treasures
