= Michel Félibien =

French historian and writer

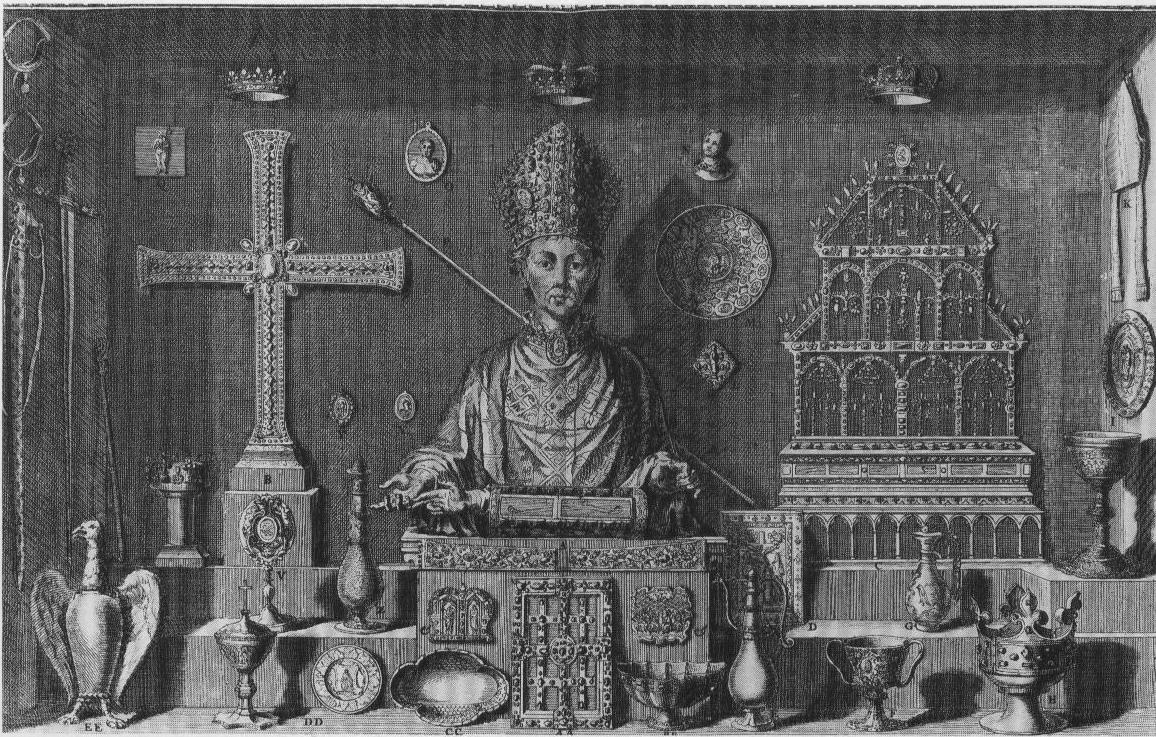
Print from Félibien's Histoire de l'abbaye royale de Saint-Denys en France

Michel Félibien (14 September 1665 – 25 September 1719) was a French historian, who wrote a five-volume history of Paris, unfinished at his death, but completed by Guy-Alexis Lobineau and published in 1725.

He was the son of the French historian André Félibien and in 1683 became a Benedictine monk in the Congregation of Saint Maur (known for their high level of scholarship) at the Abbey of Saint-Germain-des-Prés in Paris. He is also known for his history of the Royal Abbey of Saint-Denis, published in 1706. This book contains five engraved prints depicting objects from the treasury of the abbey, now mostly missing.
