= Virginie Ghesquière =

French woman soldier

Virginie Ghesquière (1768–1867), was a French soldier. She served in the Napoleonic army dressed as a man from 1806 to 1812. She served under Andoche Junot during the Peninsular War, and was promoted to sergeant and lieutenant.

She is known as one of the three women (alongside Anne Biget and Marie-Jeanne Schellinck) rumoured to have been given the Legion of Honour by Napoleon I. That is unconfirmed, but she was given the Saint Helena Medal in 1857.
