= Legion of Honour =

Highest French order of merit

National Order of the Legion of Honour Ordre national de la Légion d'honneur
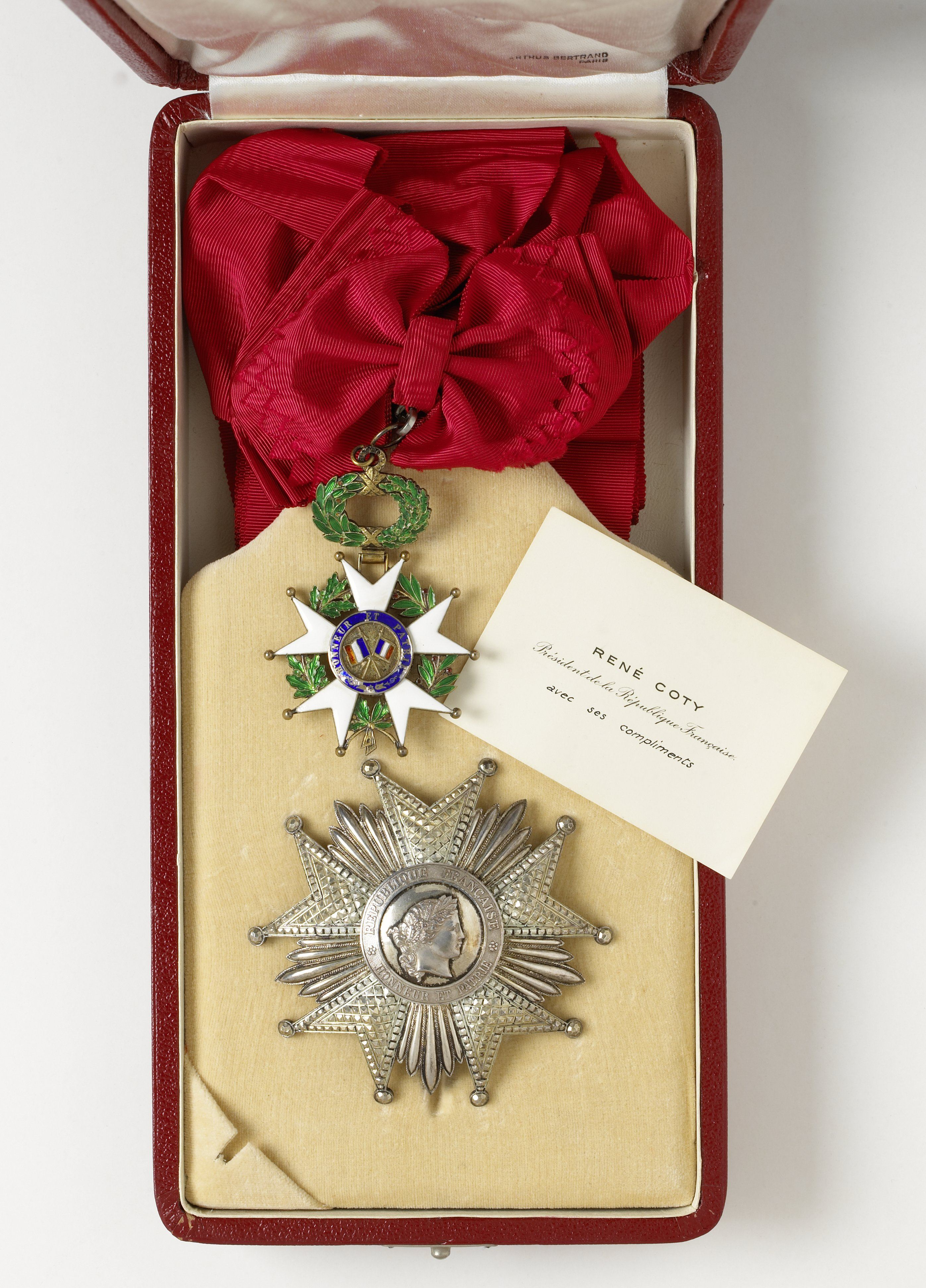
- The silver version of the Grand Cross of the order given by President René Coty to Dutch Prime Minister Willem Drees

Awarded by the president of France
- Type: Order of merit
- Established: 19 May 1802
- Country: France
- Motto: Honneur et patrie ("Honour and Fatherland")
- Eligibility: Military and civilians
- Awarded for: Excellent civil or military conduct delivered, upon official investigation
- Founder: Napoleon Bonaparte
- Grand Master: Emmanuel Macron, President of France
- Grand Chancellor: François Lecointre
- Secretary-General: Julien Le Gars
- Classes: (in 2010): 1 Grand-maître; 67 Grand(s)-croix; 314 Grand(s) officier(s); 3,009 Commandeur(s); 17,032 Officier(s); 74,384 Chevalier(s)

Statistics
- First induction: 15 July 1804

Precedence
- Next (higher): None
- Next (lower): Order of Liberation (ceased 24 January 1946)
- Order's streamer; Grand-croix; Grand-officier; Commandeur; Officier; Chevalier; Ribbon bars of the order

The National Order of the Legion of Honour (French: Ordre national de la Légion d'honneur [ɔʁdʁ nɑsjɔnal d(ə) la leʒjɔ̃ dɔnœʁ]), formerly the Imperial Order of the Legion of Honour (Ordre impérial de la Légion d'honneur), is the highest and most prestigious French national institution, both military and civil. It consists of five classes and was originally established in 1802 by Napoleon Bonaparte. The order has been retained, with occasional minor alterations, by all subsequent French governments and regimes.

The order's motto is Honneur et Patrie ("Honour and Fatherland"); its seat is the Palais de la Légion d'Honneur next to the Musée d'Orsay, on the left bank of the Seine in Paris. (Note: The award for the French Legion of Honour is known by many titles, also depending on the five levels of degree: Knight of the Legion of Honour; Chevalier de la Légion d'honneur; Officer of the Legion of Honour; Officier de la Légion d'honneur; Commander of the Legion of Honour; Commandeur de la Légion d'honneur; Grand Officer of the Legion of Honour; Grand officier de la Légion d'honneur; Grand Cross of the Legion of Honour; Grand'Croix de la Légion d'honneur. The word honneur is often capitalised, as in the name of the palace Palais de la Légion d'Honneur.) Since 1 February 2023, the Order's grand chancellor has been retired general François Lecointre.

The order is divided into five degrees of increasing distinction: Chevalier (Knight), Officier (Officer), Commandeur (Commander), Grand officier (Grand Officer) and Grand-croix (Grand Cross).

While prestigious, the Legion of Honour has sometimes been controversial. The order of merit has been awarded to Harvey Weinstein, Mohammed bin Nayef, Vladimir Putin, Bashar al-Assad, and Manuel Noriega. In 2010, the order's rules were changed to revoke Noriega's award after his extradition to France due to his conviction for money laundering. In 2017, further reforms to the award were made.

Notable individuals who have refused the award include Marjane Satrapi, Albert Camus, and Jean-Paul Sartre.

== History ==
=== Consulate ===
During the French Revolution, all of the French orders of chivalry were abolished and replaced with weapons of honour. It was the wish of Napoleon Bonaparte, the First Consul, to create a reward to commend civilians and soldiers. From this wish was instituted a Légion d'honneur, a body of men that was not an order of chivalry, for Napoleon believed that France wanted a recognition of merit rather than a new system of nobility. However, the Légion d'honneur did use the organization of the old French orders of chivalry, for example, the Ordre de Saint-Louis. The insignia of the Légion d'honneur bear a resemblance to those of the Ordre de Saint-Louis, which also used a red ribbon.

Napoleon originally created this award to ensure political loyalty. The organization would be used as a façade to give political favours, gifts, and concessions. The Légion d'honneur was loosely patterned after a Roman legion, with legionaries, officers, commanders, regional "cohorts" and a grand council. The highest rank was not a Grand Cross but a Grand aigle (Grand Eagle), a rank that wore the insignia common to a Grand Cross. The members were paid, the highest of them extremely generously:

- 5,000 francs to a grand officier,
- 2,000 francs to a commandeur,
- 1,000 francs to an officier,
- 250 francs to a légionnaire.

Napoleon famously declared, "You call these baubles, well, it is with baubles that men are led... Do you think that you would be able to make men fight by reasoning? Never. That is good only for the scholar in his study. The soldier needs glory, distinctions, rewards." This has been often quoted as "It is with such baubles that men are led." Napoleon was also occasionally noted after a battle to ask who the bravest man in a regiment was, and upon the regiment declaring the individual, the Emperor would take the Legion d'honneur from his own coat and pin it on the chest of the man.

The order was one of the first modern orders of merit. Under the monarchy, such orders were often limited to Roman Catholics, all knights had to be noblemen, and military decorations were restricted to officers. The Légion d'honneur, however, was open to men of all ranks and professions; only merit or bravery counted. The only similar modern order, open to everyone, to predate it was the Swedish Order of Vasa. The new legionnaire had to be sworn into the Légion d'honneur. All previous orders were Christian, or shared a clear Christian background, whereas the Légion d'honneur is a secular institution. The badge of the Légion d'honneur has five arms.

Legion of Honour ribbons
Knight (Chevalier)	Officer	Commander	Grand Officer	Grand Cross (Grand-Croix)

=== First Empire ===
In a decree issued on the 10 Pluviôse XIII (30 January 1805), a grand decoration was instituted. This decoration, a cross on a large sash and a silver star with an eagle, symbol of the Napoleonic Empire, became known as the Grand aigle (Grand Eagle), and later in 1814 as the Grand cordon (big sash, literally "big ribbon"). After Napoleon crowned himself Emperor of the French in 1804 and established the Napoleonic nobility in 1808, award of the Légion d'honneur gave right to the title of "Knight of the Empire" (Chevalier de l'Empire). The title was made hereditary after three generations of grantees.

Napoleon had dispensed 15 golden collars of the Légion d'honneur among his family and his senior ministers. This collar was abolished in 1815.

Although research is made difficult by the loss of the archives, it is rumoured that three women who fought with the army were decorated with the order: Virginie Ghesquière, Marie-Jeanne Schelling and a nun, Sister Anne Biget. (Note: The first recorded women's award is 1851, under Louis-Napoleon Bonaparte.)

The Légion d'honneur was prominent and visible in the French Empire. The Emperor always wore it, and the fashion of the time allowed for decorations to be worn most of the time. The king of Sweden therefore declined the order; it was too common in his eyes. Napoleon's own decorations were captured by the Prussians and were displayed in the Zeughaus (armoury) in Berlin until 1945. Today, they are in Moscow.

The Legion of Honour under the Empire
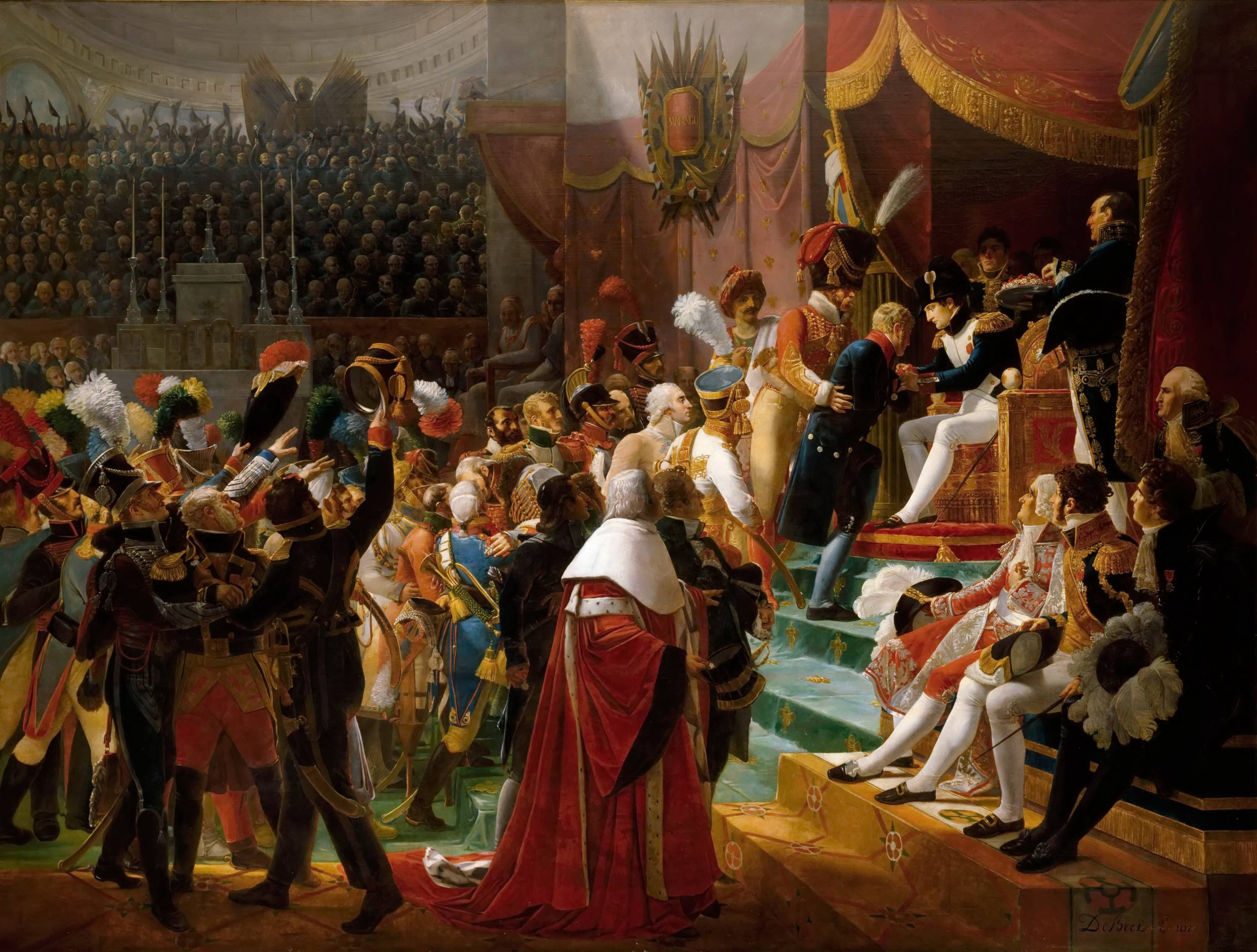
First Légion d'Honneur investiture, 15 July 1804, at Saint-Louis des Invalides by Jean-Baptiste Debret (1812)

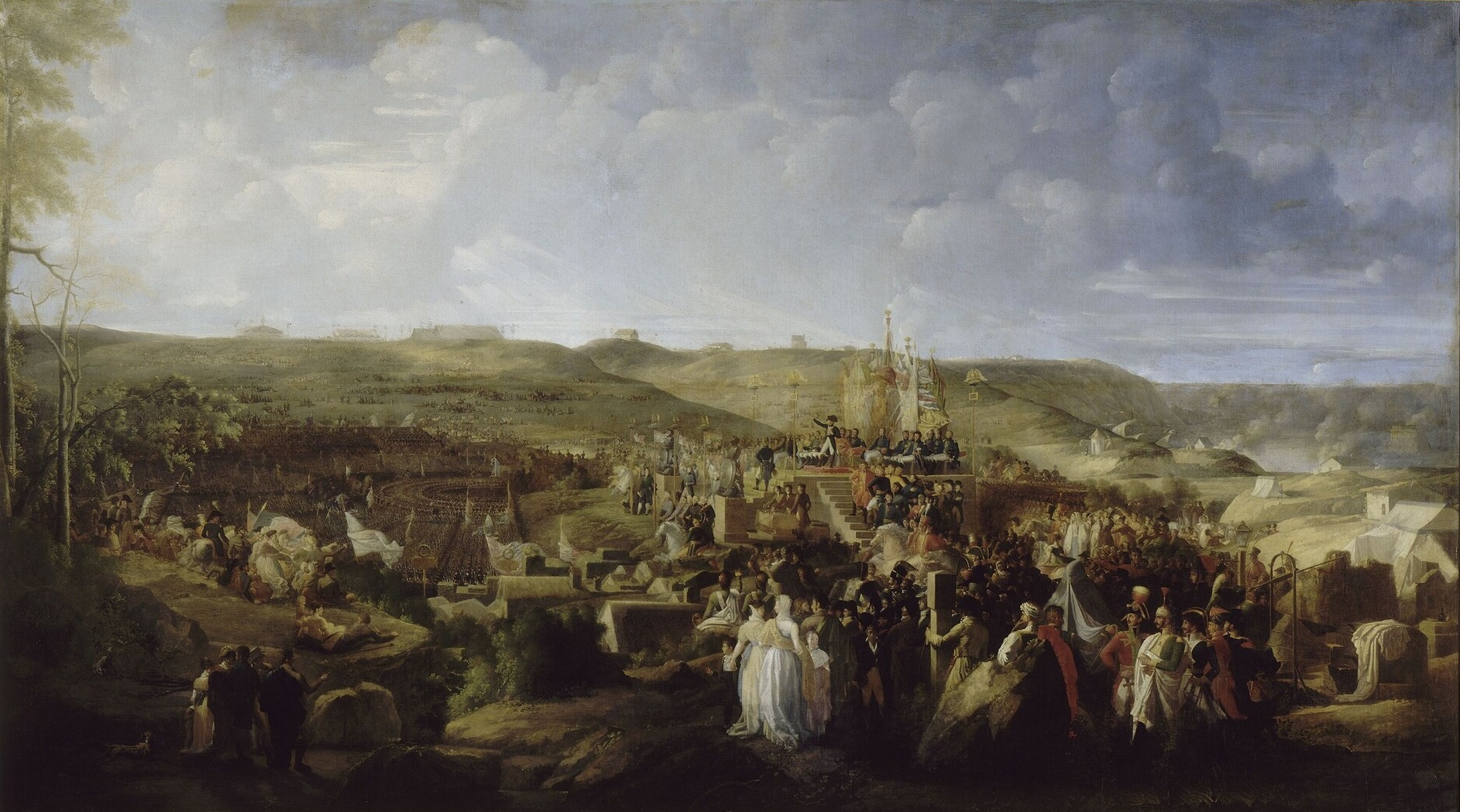
Napoleon Distributing the Legion of Honour at the Camp of Boulogne by Philippe-Auguste Hennequin. A depiction of Napoleon making some of the first awards of the Legion of Honour, at a camp near Boulogne on 16 August 1804

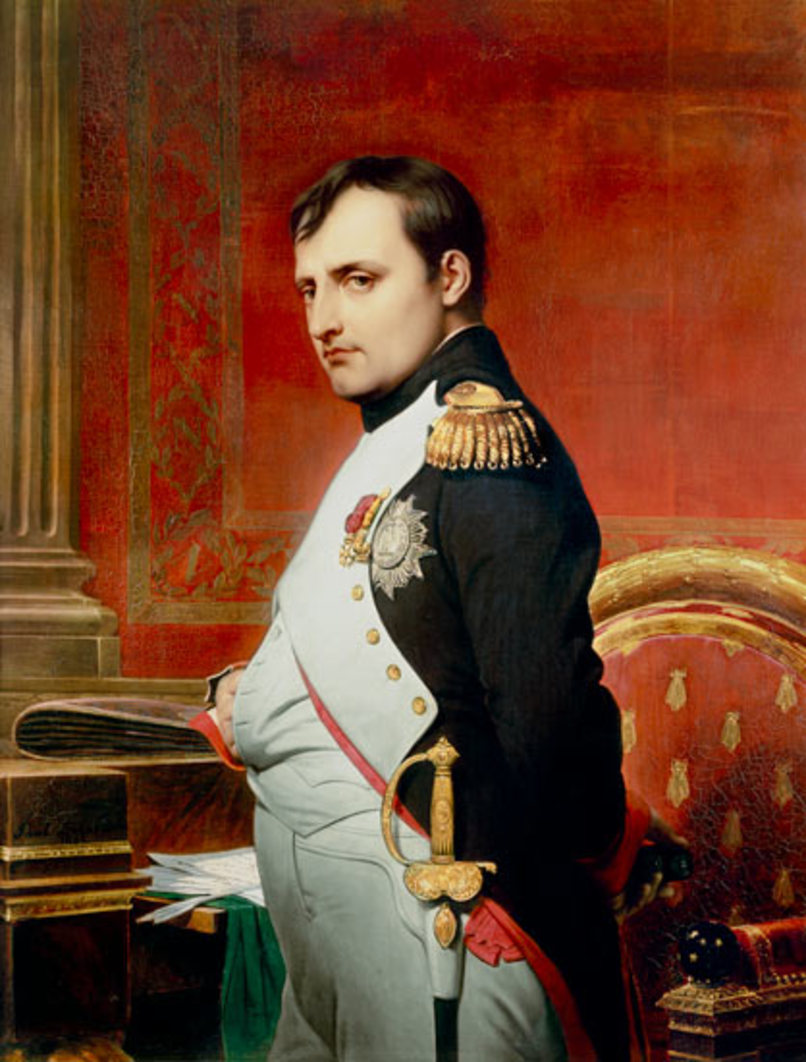
As Emperor, Napoleon always wore the Cross and Grand Eagle of the Legion of Honour.

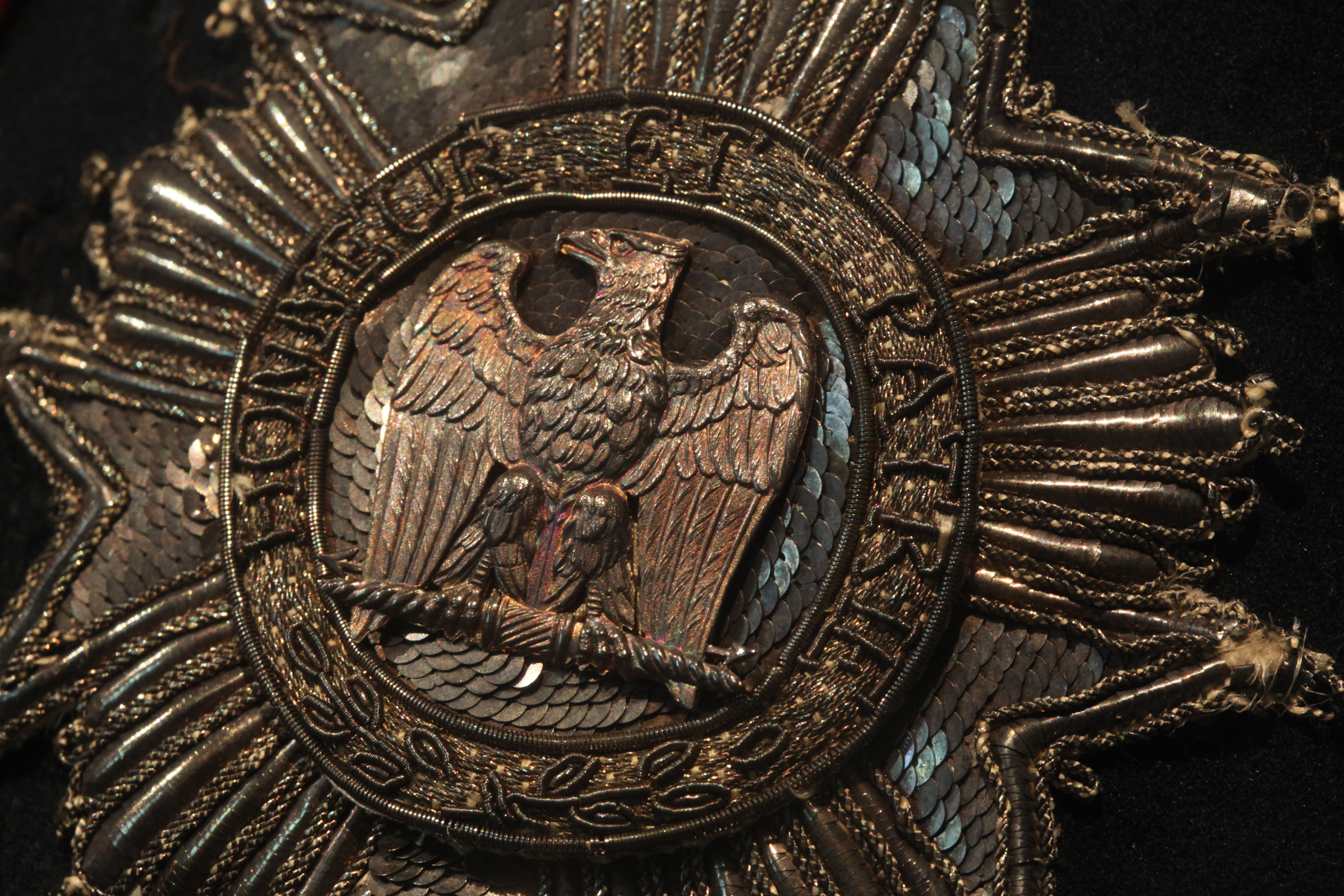
Embroidered insignia of the Legion of Honour, detail of Napoleon's uniform of colonel of the Chasseurs à cheval of the Imperial Guard

Generic heraldic markers (red band and legion cross) of a Knight of the Empire with the Legion of Honour

=== Restoration of the Bourbon King of France in 1814 ===
Louis XVIII changed the appearance of the order, but it was not abolished. To have done so would have angered the 35,000 to 38,000 members. The images of Napoleon and his eagle were removed and replaced by the image of King Henry IV, the popular first king of the Bourbon line. Three Bourbon fleurs-de-lys replaced the eagle on the reverse of the order. A king's crown replaced the imperial crown. In 1816, the grand cordons were renamed grand crosses and the legionnaires became knights. The king decreed that the commandants were now commanders. The Légion d'honneur became the second-ranking order of knighthood of the French monarchy, after the Order of the Holy Spirit.

=== July Monarchy ===
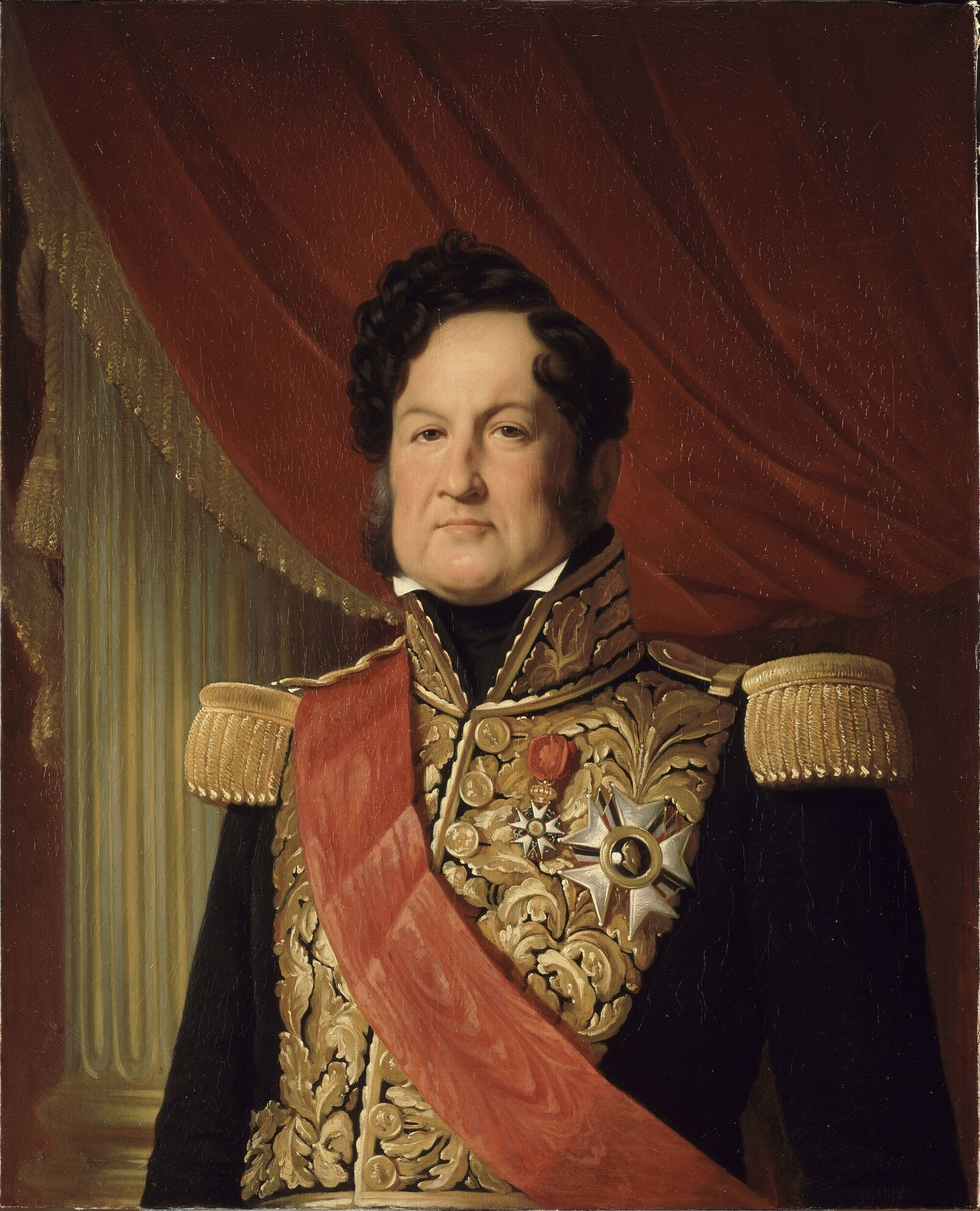
Louis Philippe I, King of the French, wearing the sash and star of the Grand Cross, as well as the Officers Cross of the order

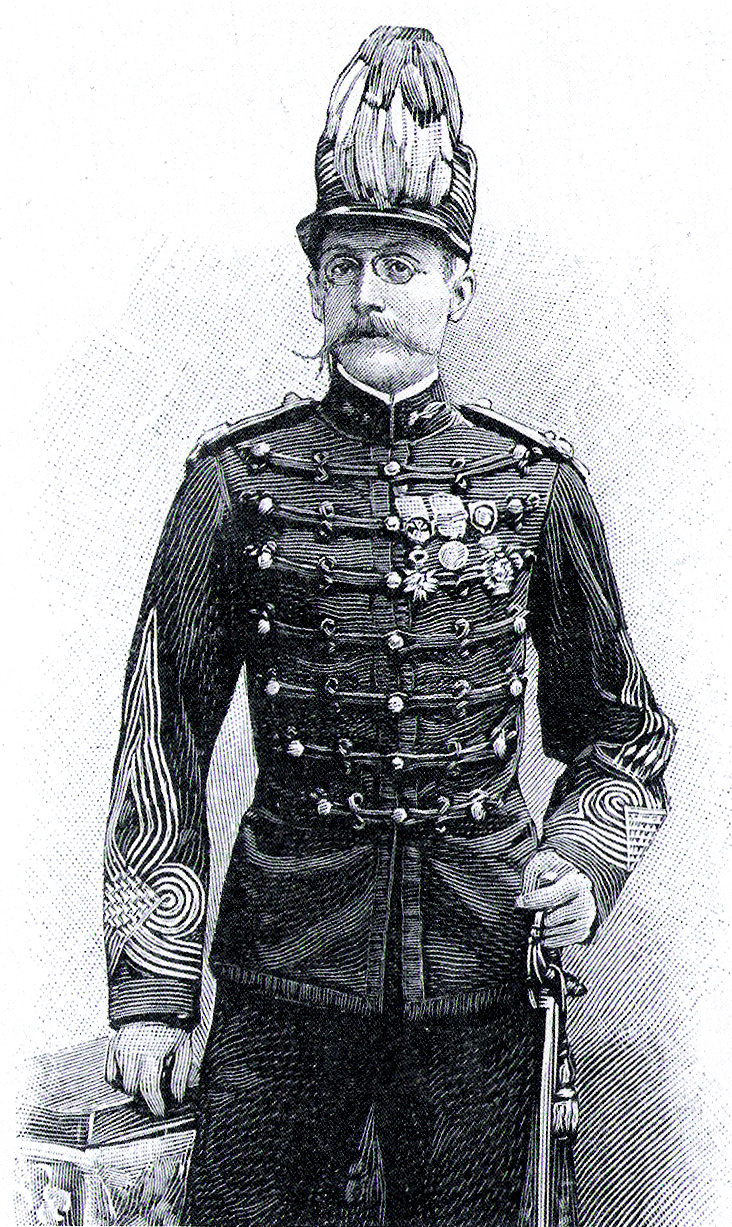
Jean-François Klobb, recipient of the Legion of Honour

Following the overthrow of the Bourbons in favour of King Louis Philippe I of the House of Orléans, the Bourbon monarchy's orders were once again abolished and the Légion d'honneur was restored in 1830 as the paramount decoration of the French nation. The insignia were drastically altered; the cross now displayed tricolour flags. In 1847, there were 47,000 members.

=== Second Republic ===
Yet another revolution in Paris (in 1848) brought a new republic (the second) and a new design to the Légion d'honneur. A nephew of the founder, Louis-Napoléon Bonaparte, was elected president and he restored the image of his uncle on the crosses of the order. In 1852, the first recorded woman, Angélique Duchemin, an old revolutionary of the 1789 uprising against the absolute monarchy, was admitted into the order. On 2 December 1851, President Louis-Napoléon Bonaparte staged a coup d'état with the help of the armed forces. He made himself Emperor of the French exactly one year later on 2 December 1852, after a successful plebiscite.

=== Second Empire ===
An Imperial crown was added. During Napoleon III's reign, the first American was admitted: Thomas Wiltberger Evans, dentist of Napoleon III.

=== Third Republic ===
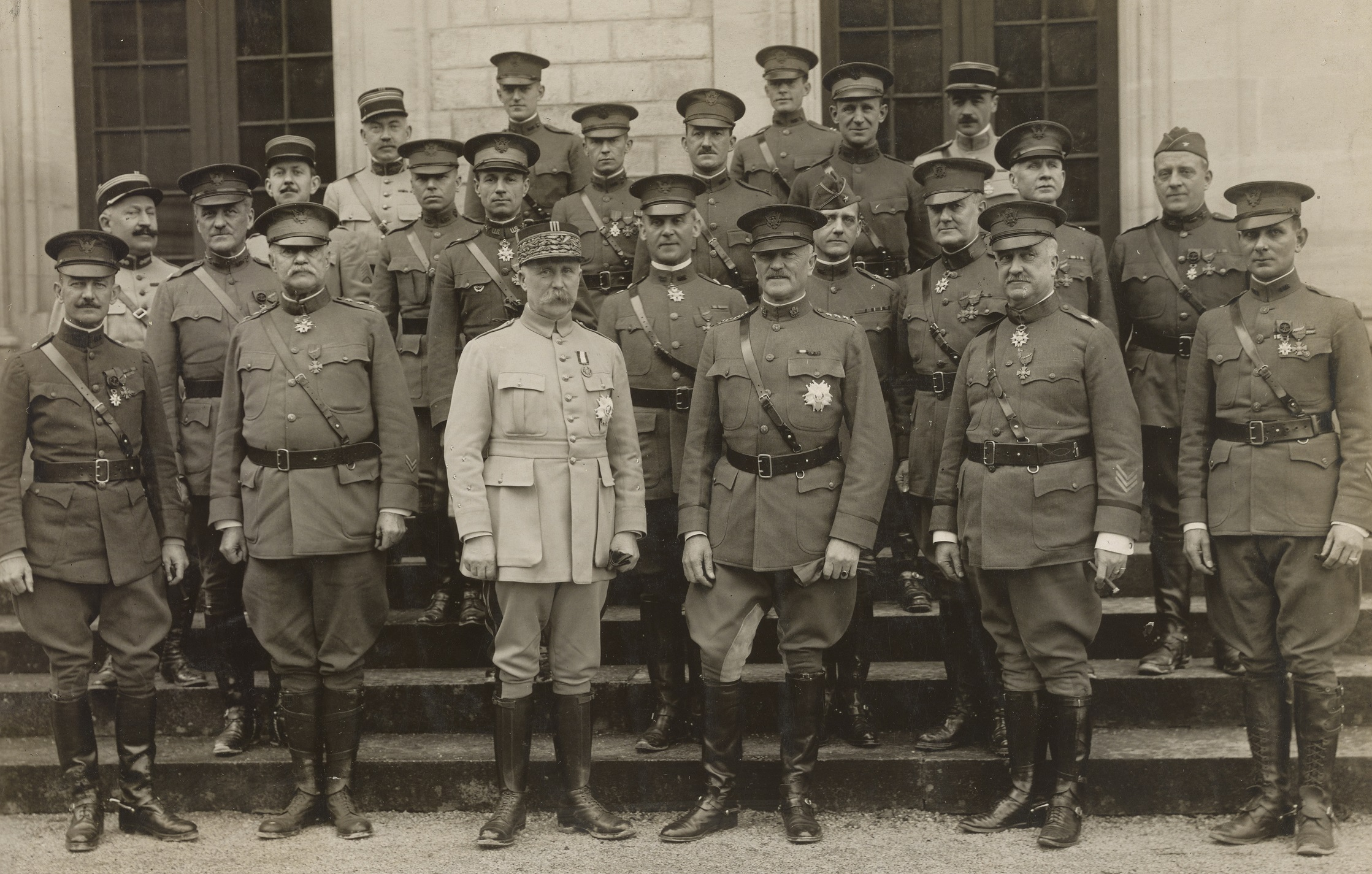
Philippe Pétain and John J. Pershing were decorated with the Grand-croix of the Legion of Honour, as were several US generals with the Commandeur and Chevalier medals shortly after World War I, in 1919.

In 1870, the defeat of the French Imperial Army in the Franco-Prussian War brought the end of the Empire and the creation of the Third Republic (1871–1940). As France changed, the Légion d'honneur changed as well. The crown was replaced by a laurel and oak wreath. In 1871, during the Paris Commune uprising, the Hôtel de Salm, headquarters of the Légion d'honneur, was burned to the ground in fierce street combats; the archives of the order were lost.

In the second term of President Jules Grévy, which started in 1885, newspaper journalists brought to light the trafficking of Grévy's son-in-law, Daniel Wilson, in the awarding of decorations of the Légion d'honneur. Grévy was not accused of personal participation in this scandal, but he was slow to accept his indirect political responsibility, which caused his eventual resignation on 2 December 1887.

During World War I, some 55,000 decorations were conferred, 20,000 of which went to foreigners. The large number of decorations resulted from the new posthumous awards authorised in 1918. Traditionally, membership in the Légion d'honneur could not be awarded posthumously.

=== Fourth Republic ===
The establishment of the Fourth Republic in 1946 brought about the latest change in the design of the Legion of Honour. The date "1870" on the obverse was replaced by a single star. No changes were made after the establishment of the Fifth Republic in 1958.

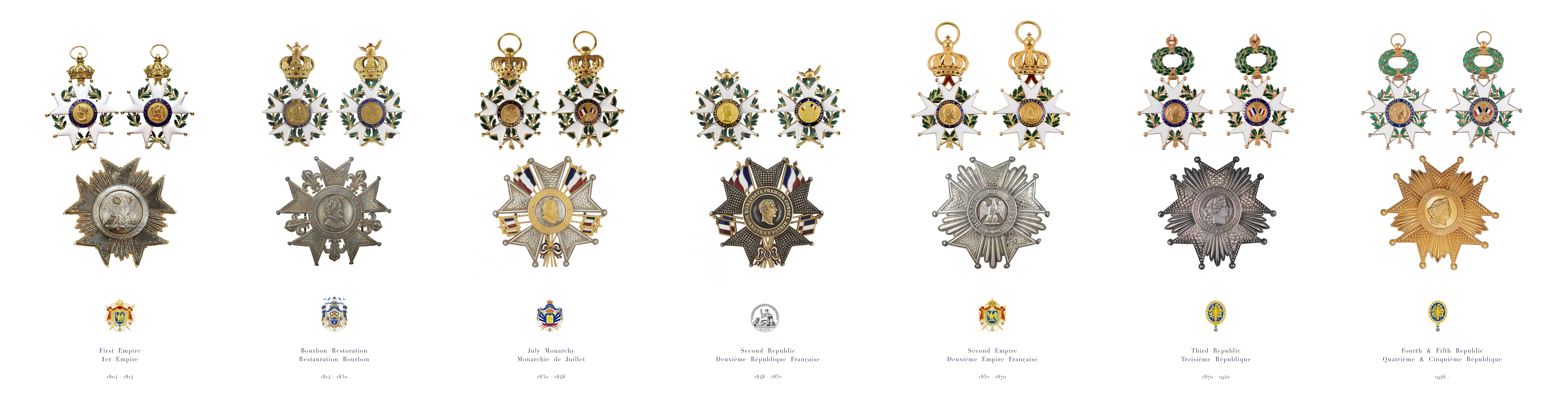
Evolution of the insignia of the Grand Cross of the Legion d'Honneur through Frances various governments and regimes, from the First Empire to the current Fifth Republic

In 1945, the leader of France’s Vichy regime Philippe Pétain was convicted of high treason and conspiring with the enemy and stripped of his Legion of Honour. He was the only former president of France to have his award revoked until 2025.

=== Fifth Republic ===
Retired general Benoît Puga served as the Grand Chancellor from 2016 to 2023.

=== Reform ===
In 2010, the former Panamanian dictator Manuel Noriega was extradited to France to serve a prison term for money laundering funds from drug trafficking, and he had previously been made a Commandeur in 1987. The code governing the Legion of Honour was changed so that it could be stripped from a foreigner who had been "sentenced for a crime or to a prison term of at least one year without possibility of parole" or if they had "committed acts or behaved in such a way that could be declared dishonourable, or could damage the interests of France abroad or the causes that France supports throughout the world".

On 2 November 2017, Emmanuel Macron's government announced that the conferral of the award would become more selective and "merit-based" in order to "return to the spirit" of the Legion of Honour. The reform would decrease the number of civilians who receive the decoration by 50%, the number of military personnel by 10%, and the number of foreign citizens by 25%. The initiative came after a highly publicised decision in October for Macron to "begin the process" of stripping Harvey Weinstein of his order after accusations of rape and sexual abuse.

In 2025, after former president Nicolas Sarkozy's conviction for corruption was confirmed in the previous year, he was stripped of his award as any recipient sentenced to a term in prison equal to or greater than a year would be excluded from the order. Emmanuel Macron argued unsuccessfully against the decision, stating that it was "very important that former presidents are respected".

== Organisation ==
=== Legal status and leadership ===
The Legion of Honour is a national order of France, meaning a public incorporated body. The Legion is regulated by a civil law code, the "Code of the Legion of Honour and of the Military Medal". While the President of the French Republic is the Grand Master of the order, day-to-day running is entrusted to the Grand Chancery (Grande Chancellerie de la Légion d'honneur).

==== Grand Master ====
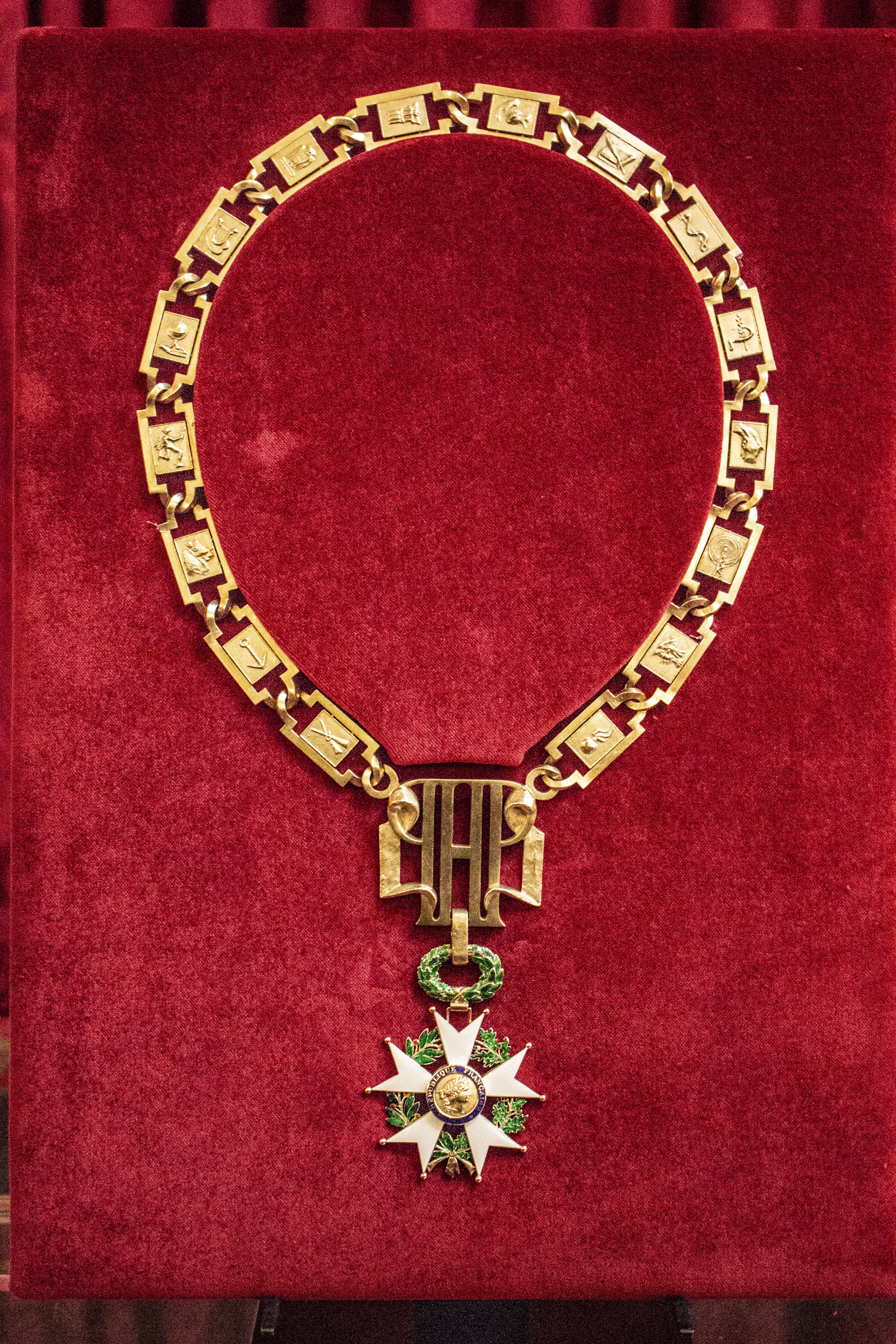
Current collar of the Fifth Republic, which is the insignia of the Grand Master at the Élysée Palace during a presidential inauguration. The collar is usually kept in the Musée de la Legion d'Honneur.

Since the establishment of the Legion, the Grand Master of the order has always been the Emperor, King or President of France. President Emmanuel Macron therefore became the Grand Master of the Legion upon his inauguration as President on 14 May 2017.

The Grand Master appoints all other members of the order, on the advice of the French government. The Grand Master's insignia is the Grand Collar of the Legion. The President of the Republic, as Grand Master of the order, receives the Collar as part of his investiture, but the Grand Masters have not worn the Collar since Valéry Giscard d'Estaing.

==== The Grand Chancery ====
The Grand Chancery is headed by the Grand Chancellor (grand chancelier), usually a retired general, as well as the Secretary-General (secrétaire général), a civilian administrator.

- Grand Chancellor: General François Lecointre (since 2023)
- Secretary-General: Julien Le Gars (since 2023)

The Grand Chancery also regulates the National Order of Merit and the médaille militaire (Military Medal). There are several structures funded by and operated under the authority of the Grand Chancery, like the Legion of Honour Schools (Maisons d'éducation de la Légion d'honneur) and the Legion of Honour Museum (Musée de la Légion d'honneur). The Legion of Honour Schools are elite boarding schools in Saint-Denis and Camp des Loges in the forest of Saint-Germain-en-Laye. Study there is restricted to daughters, granddaughters, and great-granddaughters of members of the order, the médaille militaire or the ordre national du Mérite.

=== Membership ===
There are five classes in the Legion of Honour:

- Chevalier (Knight): minimum 20 years of public service or 25 years of professional activity with "eminent merits"
- Officier (Officer): minimum 8 years in the rank of Chevalier
- Commandeur (Commander): minimum 5 years in the rank of Officier
- Grand officier (Grand Officer): minimum 3 years in the rank of Commandeur
- Grand-croix (Grand Cross): minimum 3 years in the rank of Grand-officier

The "eminent merits" required to be awarded the order require the flawless performance of one's trade as well as doing more than ordinarily expected, such as being creative, zealous and contributing to the growth and well-being of others.

The order has a maximum quota of 75 Grand Cross, 250 Grand Officers, 1,250 Commanders, 10,000 Officers, and 113,425 (ordinary) Knights. As of 2010, the actual membership was 67 Grand Cross, 314 Grand Officers, 3,009 Commanders, 17,032 Officers and 74,384 Knights. Appointments of veterans of World War II, French military personnel involved in the North African Campaign and other foreign French military operations, as well as wounded soldiers, are made independently of the quota.

Members convicted of a felony (crime in French) are automatically dismissed from the order. Members convicted of a misdemeanour (délit in French) can be dismissed as well, although this is not automatic.

Wearing the decoration of the Légion d'honneur without having the right to do so is a serious offence. Wearing the ribbon or rosette of a foreign order is prohibited if that ribbon is mainly red, like the ribbon of the Legion of Honour.

In theory, French military personnel in uniform are required to salute other military members in uniform wearing the medal (but not the ribbon), whatever the Légion d'honneur rank and the military rank of the bearer. In practice, however, this is rarely done.

There is not a single, complete list of all the members of the Legion in chronological order. The number is estimated at one million, including about 2,900 Knights Grand Cross.

==== French nationals ====
French nationals, men and women, can be received into the Légion, for "eminent merit" (mérites éminents) in military or civil life. In practice, in current usage, the order is conferred on entrepreneurs, high-level civil servants, scientists, artists, including famous actors and actresses, sport champions, (Note: All Olympic Gold Medal winners are awarded the Légion.) and others with connections in the executive. Members of the French Parliament cannot receive the order, except for valour in war, and ministers are not allowed to nominate their accountants.

Until 2008, French nationals could only enter the Legion of Honour at the class of Chevalier (Knight). To be promoted to a higher class, one had to perform new eminent services in the interest of France and a set number of years had to pass between appointment and promotion. This was however amended in 2008 when entry became possible at Officer, Commander and Grand Officer levels, as a recognition of "extraordinary careers" (carrières hors du commun). In 2009, Simone Veil became the first person to enter the Order at Grand Officer level. Veil was a member of the Académie française, a former Health Minister and President of the European Parliament, as well as an Auschwitz survivor. She was promoted to Grand Cross in 2012.

==== Non-French recipients ====
While membership in the Légion is technically restricted to French nationals, foreign nationals who have served France or the ideals it upholds may receive the honour. Foreign nationals who live in France are subject to the same requirements as the French. Foreign nationals who live abroad may be awarded a distinction of any rank or dignity in the Légion. Foreign heads of state and their spouses or consorts of monarchs are made Grand Cross as a courtesy. American and British veterans who served in either World War on French soil, or during the 1944 campaigns to liberate France, may be eligible for appointment as Chevalier of the Legion of Honour, provided they were still living when the honour was approved.

==== Collective awards ====
Collective appointments can be made to cities, institutions or companies. A total of 64 settlements in France have been decorated, as well as six foreign cities: Liège in 1914, Belgrade in 1920, Luxembourg City in 1957, Volgograd (the World War II 'Stalingrad') in 1984, Algiers in 2004, and London in 2020. French towns display the decoration in their municipal coat of arms.

Organisations to receive the honour include the French Red Cross (Croix-Rouge Française), the Abbaye de Nôtre-Dame des Dombes (Abbey of Notre-Dame des Dombes), the French National Railway Company (SNCF, Société Nationale des Chemins de fer Français), the Préfecture de Police de la Ville de Paris (Prefecture of Police of Paris), and various Grandes Écoles (National (Elite) Colleges) and other educational establishments.

==== Military awards ====
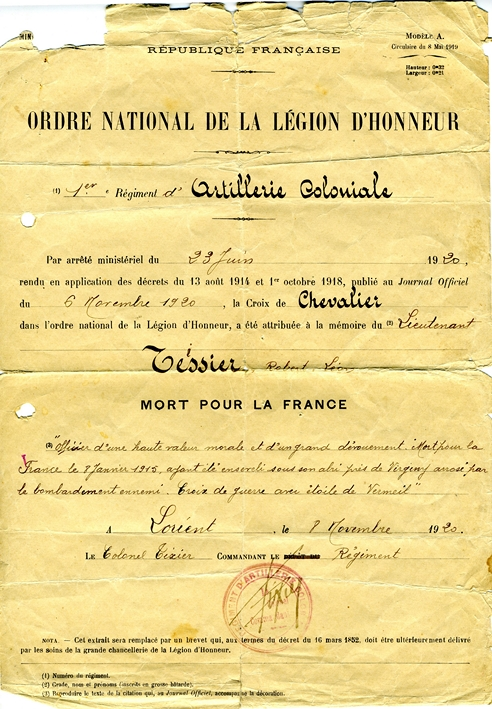
Notice of posthumous award of the Croix de Chevalier to Lieutenant Robert Léon Tessier—Mort pour la France ("Died for France") in World War I

The military distinctions (Légion d'honneur à titre militaire) are awarded for bravery (actions de guerre) or for service.

- award for extreme bravery: the Légion d'Honneur is awarded jointly with a mention in dispatches. This is the top valour award in France. It is rarely awarded, mainly to soldiers who have died in battle.
- award for service: the Légion is awarded without any citation.

===== French service-members =====
For active-duty commissioned officers, the Legion of Honour award for service is achieved after 20 years of meritorious service, having been awarded the rank of Chevalier of the Ordre National du Mérite. Bravery awards lessen the time needed for the award—in fact decorated servicemen become directly chevaliers of the Légion d'Honneur, skipping the Ordre du Mérite. Non-commissioned officers (NCOs) almost never achieve that award, except for the most heavily decorated service members.

===== Collective military awards =====
Collective appointments can be made to military units. In the case of a military unit, its flag is decorated with the insignia of a knight, which is a different award from the fourragère. Twenty-one schools, mainly schools providing reserve officers during the World Wars, were awarded the Légion d'Honneur. Foreign military units can be decorated with the order, such as the U.S. Military Academy.

The Flag or Standard of the following units was decorated with the Cross of a Knight of the Legion of Honour: (Note: Officially, military units are not members of the Legion of Honour, which include only individuals. As for foreign Legionnaires, they are "decorated with the Legion of Honour insignia", not "member of the Legion of Honour". Do not confuse military units that received the fourragère to the colour of the ribbon of the Legion of Honour (units quoted at six, seven or eight times in the order of the army with military units whose flag is decorated with the Cross of the Legion of Honour.)

- 1st Foreign Regiment
- 1st Marine Artillery Regiment
- 1st Marine Infantry Regiment
- 1st Marine Infantry Parachute Regiment
- 1st Photographic Technical Unit (USAAF Forward-deployed Reconnaissance Unit)
- 1st Parachute Chasseur Regiment
- 1st Regiment of African Chasseurs
- 1st Regiment of Algerian Tirailleurs
- 1st Regiment of Riflemen
- 1st Regiment of Senegalese Tirailleurs
- 1st Train Regiment
- 2nd Foreign Parachute Regiment
- 2nd Marine Infantry Regiment
- 2nd Regiment of Algerian Tirailleurs
- 2nd Regiment of Zouaves
- 3rd Algerian Infantry Regiment
- 3rd Foreign Infantry Regiment
- 3rd Regiment of Zouaves
- 4th Tunisian Tirailleurs Regiment
- 4th Regiment of Zouaves
- Joint 4th Regiment of Zouaves and Tirailleurs
- 7th Algerian Infantry Regiment
- 8th Infantry Regiment
- 8th Zouaves Regiment
- 9th Regiment of Zouaves
- 11th Marine Artillery Regiment
- 23rd Infantry Regiment
- 23rd Marine Infantry Regiment
- 24th Marine Infantry Regiment
- 26th Infantry Regiment
- 30th Battalion of Chasseurs
- 43rd Marine Infantry Regiment
- 51st Infantry Regiment
- 57th Infantry Regiment
- 112th Line Infantry Regiment (French infantry regiment consisting of mostly Belgians, known as "The Victors of Raab")
- 137th Infantry Regiment
- 152nd Infantry Regiment
- 153rd Infantry Regiment
- 298th Infantry Regiment
- Fighter Squadron 1/30 Normandie-Niemen
- Fusiliers Marins (Naval Infantry)
- Moroccan Goumier
- Paris Fire Brigade
- Régiment d'infanterie-chars de marine (Colonial Infantry Regiment of Morocco). Book of the regiment will be fighting its most decorated emblem of the French army.

== Classes and insignia ==
The five classes wearing their respective insignia (gentlemen): 1: Chevalier; 2: Officier; 3: Commandeur; 4: Grand-officier; 5: Grand-croix

The order has had five levels since the reign of King Louis XVIII, who restored the order in 1815. Since the reform, the following distinctions have existed:

- Three ranks:
  - Chevalier (Knight): badge worn on left breast suspended from ribbon
  - Officier (Officer): badge worn on left breast suspended from a ribbon with a rosette
  - Commandeur (Commander): badge around neck suspended from ribbon necklet
- Two dignities:
  - Grand officier (Grand Officer): badge worn on left breast suspended from a ribbon (Officer), with star displayed on right breast
  - Grand-croix (Grand Cross), formerly Grande décoration, Grand aigle, or Grand cordon: the highest level; badge affixed to sash worn over the right shoulder, with a gilt silver star displayed on left breast

Due to the order's long history, and the remarkable fact that it has been retained by all subsequent governments and regimes since the First Empire, the order's design has undergone many changes. Although the basic shape and structure of the insignia has remained generally the same, the hanging device changed back and forth and France itself swung back and forth between republic and monarchy. The central disc in the centre has also changed to reflect the political system and leadership of France at the time. As each new regime came along the design was altered to become politically correct for the time, sometimes even changed multiple times during one historical era.

How the design of the Légion d'honneur changed through each various era and regime, shown through the example of the obverse and reverse of the Officers cross. See below for a detailed explanation of each era.

The badge of the Légion is shaped as a five-armed "Maltese Asterisk", using five distinctive "arrowhead" shaped arms inspired by the Maltese Cross. The badge is rendered in gilt (in silver for chevalier) enameled white, with an enameled laurel and oak wreath between the arms. The obverse central disc is in gilt, featuring the head of Marianne, surrounded by the legend République Française on a blue enamel ring. The reverse central disc is also in gilt, with a set of crossed tricolores, surrounded by the Légion's motto Honneur et Patrie ('Honour and Fatherland') and its foundation date on a blue enamel ring. The badge is suspended by an enameled laurel and oak wreath.

The star (or plaque) is worn by the Grand Cross (in gilt on the left chest) and the Grand Officer (in silver on the right chest) respectively; it is similar to the badge, but without enamel, and with the wreath replaced by a cluster of rays in between each arm. The central disc features the head of Marianne, surrounded by the legend République Française ('French Republic') and the motto Honneur et Patrie.

The ribbon for the medal is plain red.

The badge or star is not usually worn, except at the time of the decoration ceremony or on a dress uniform or formal wear. Instead, one normally wears the ribbon or rosette on their suit.

For less formal occasions, recipients wear a simple stripe of thread sewn onto the lapel (red for chevaliers and officiers, silver for commandeurs). Except when wearing a dark suit with a lapel, women instead typically wear a small lapel pin called a barrette. Recipients purchase the special thread and barrettes at a store in Paris near the Palais-Royal.

Historical Era/Period	Notes	Obverse	Reverse	Hanging Device
1804	The first model of the Legion d'Honneur did not hang from a crown or wreath. It lasted for just 9 months from May 1804 until February 1805 and encompassed the founding of the First French Empire on the 18th May 1804. Despite being officially established on 19 May 1802, no awards were made until this version. This version shows the Emperor on the obverse and the imperial eagle on the reverse. The text on the ring on both the obverse and reverse would remain the same during the entirety of Napoleon's reign.			
1805	The second model of differed only from the first by the addition of the imperial crown atop the cross, and was attached to one of the arms of the cross. The image of the Emperor is also slightly smaller than the previous version, while the reverse ring also has a stylised wreath at the bottom instead of three stars.			
1806–1808	The third model is very similar to the previous second version however the depiction of Napoleon is more similar to the first version and the obverse ring has a wreath at the bottom. The crown, while almost identical to that of the second version this time is free-hanging and separately fixed above the cross.			
1808–1809	The fourth model has as slightly different depiction of the Emperor while the obverse ring has a star and dots in place of the previous versions wreath. The reverse of the fourth model is notable as its the only First Empire model with the eagle facing to the right, while the bottom of the ring has three stars reminiscent of the first model. The crown the cross hangs from is also very different compared to the previous two versions.			
1809–1814	The fifth and final version of the First Empire is different from the other versions by the execution of larger text on the rings, with the reverse showing a distinct wreath like object at the bottom. The obverse on some models shows and enamelled laurel wreath adorning the Emperors head, while on the reverse the eagle is back facing left. The crown is also radically different from the previous models.			
1814–1830	The sixth model from the Bourbon Restoration period marks the first major alteration from the original design, due to the fact that the regime and leader of France had changed. The crown the cross hangs from has been altered and also features the main symbol of the House of Bourbon; the fleur-de-lis. The obverse features the profile of "The Good King" Henri IV with the text of the ring bearing the words; Henry IV, King of France and the Navarre. The reverse keeps the text of the previous versions; Honneur et Patrie and depicts the three fleurs-de-lis, the symbol of the Bourbons.			
1830–1848	The seventh model from the July Monarchy period is similar to the previous Bourbon Restoration period. The crown is very similar, with just the fleur-de-lis omitted, the obverse keeps the profile of Henri IV but the obverse ring bears just his name, with the rest of the ring filled with stars and a wreath. The reverse bears the first depiction of what would continue for many future iterations; the two crossed tricolours with the usual reverse ring motto Honneur et Patrie.			
1848–1851	The eighth model, used for only three years during the Second Republic is the only other example apart from the first model to not have any hanging device (no crown/wreath). The obverse once again shows a portrait of Napoleon, with the text reading "Bonaparte First Consul" and the date of the order's founding; 19 May 1802. The reverse shows the crossed tricolours as before, however this time the Honneur et Patrie is written underneath and not on the ring, the first and only time this was the case. The reverse ring instead reads République Française which would later feature on the obverse ring.			
1851–1852	The ninth or La Presidence model was only used between 1851 and 1852 and is considered by some to be a hybrid model. It is at the very least a transitional model from the design used during the Second Republic to the Second Empire. The execution of the cross is very similar to Second Republic models, just with the addition of a crown (different to that of the Second Empire models) while the obverse continues to show Napoleon, with the ring text of Napoleon Emp. des Français. The reverse shows the imperial eagle and the usual ring text. The central discs bear a striking resemblance to the fifth model.			
1852–1870	The tenth model used in the Second Empire would be the last to date to use either Napoleon's image or a crown of any sort. The crown used is quite unique and resembles the Crown of Napoleon III, while the obverse shows the Napoleon I with the ring text of Napoleon Empereur des Français (the only model to fully spell out Emperor). The reverse shows the usual imperial eagle, though this time facing right like the fourth model. The usual reverse ring text is present with a large wreath at the bottom.			
1870–1940	The eleventh model created for the Third French Republic would be another radical change, and the first to show much of the symbolism of today's model. It was the first model to hang from a wreath of laurel and oak leaves, and the first to feature the profile of Marianne on the obverse. The ring on the obverse reads; République Française, the first since the early Second Republic and the first time on the obverse, with the date 1870. The back features the tricolours and the usual text of Honneur et Patrie, in a design almost identical to the seventh model used during the July Monarchy.			
1946–	The 12th, final and current version is almost identical to the 11th. The only differences are found on the ring of the obverse, where the date of 1870, the Third Republic's founding, is replaced with a star. The reverse is also almost identical, with just the wreath at the bottom of the ring being replaced with 29 Floréal an X (29 Floréal Year 10), the date of the order's founding (19 May 1802) in the French Revolutionary Calendar. Except for these changes the Legion d'Honneur has remained unchanged from 1870, with this exact form being kept during both the Fourth and current Fifth Republic.			

== Léonore database ==
The Léonore database (Base Léonore) is a French database that lists the records of the members of the National Order of the Legion of Honour. The database lists the records of those inducted into the Legion of Honour since its 1802 inception and who died before 1977.

As of January 2014, the database contained 390,000 records.

== Refusal ==
Every year, at least five recipients decline the award. Even if they refuse to accept it, they are still included in the order's official membership. The composers Maurice Ravel and Charles Koechlin, for example, declined the award when it was offered to them.

Other notable examples of people who have refused the award include Marjane Satrapi, Albert Camus, and Jean-Paul Sartre.

== Controversies ==
The Legion of Honour is sometimes awarded to foreign dignitaries during state visits as "diplomatic reciprocity" useful to French foreign policy; however, they are rarely reported.

Controversial recipients include Russian president Vladimir Putin and Syrian president Bashar al-Assad (awarded by Jacques Chirac in 2006), Muhammad bin Nayef of Saudi Arabia (awarded by François Hollande in 2016), Romanian dictator Nicolae Ceaușescu (awarded by Charles de Gaulle), Zine El Abidine Ben Ali of Tunisia (awarded by François Mitterrand), and Ali Bongo of Gabon (awarded by Nicolas Sarkozy). Bashar al-Assad's decoration in 2001 did not become public knowledge until 2009.

In 2010, the former Panamanian dictator Manuel Noriega was extradited to France to serve a prison term for money laundering funds from drug trafficking, and he had previously been made a Commandeur in 1987. The code governing the Legion of Honour was changed so that it could be stripped from a foreigner who had been "sentenced for a crime or to a prison term of at least one year without possibility of parole" or if he or she has "committed acts or behaved in such a way that could be declared dishonourable, or could damage the interests of France abroad or the causes that France supports throughout the world".

== Revocation ==
The decision to strip the honour can only be made by a French president following the rules surrounding the honour, which states that the award can be revoked from any foreigner who has "committed acts or behaved in such a way that could be declared dishonourable, or could damage the interests of France abroad, or causes that France supports" or a foreigner sentenced to a year or more in prison.

The National Order of Merit has stated that it typically waits for a "final condemnation" before an award is withdrawn, but in the 2017 revocation of Harvey Weinstein's award, Emmanuel Macron indicated that quicker action could sometimes be taken. Traditionally, the National Order of Merit does not publicly announce the revocation of the award, and revocations are not published in the official journal of the Order.

In 2010, the rules surrounding the order were changed in order to strip Noriega of his award after his extradition to France, where he was convicted for money laundering. The awards of Weinstein and al-Assad were later stripped. In 2017, further changes to the decision-making around the award were enacted under Emmanuel Macron's government.

In 2001, Jacques Chirac awarded former Syrian president Bashar al-Assad with the great cross, however this did not become public knowledge until 2009. In 2018, seven years after the start of the Syrian civil war, Emmanuel Macron began the formal process of withdrawing the award.

In 2025, former president Nicolas Sarkozy was stripped of his award after he was convicted of corruption, despite Macron's opposition..

Other notable examples of people who have been stripped of the award include Harvey Weinstein because of his sexual abuse cases, Lance Armstrong for his use of performance-enhancing drugs, and John Galliano after his use of antisemitic slurs.

== Gallery ==
See also: Media related to Legion of Honour in heraldry at Wikimedia Commons

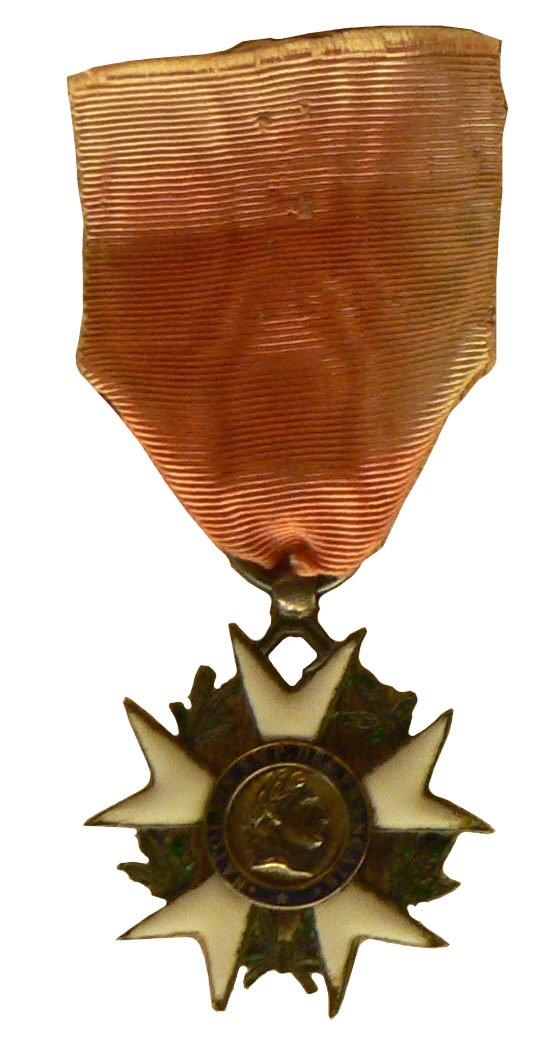
Original Légionnaire insignia, the first ever model (1804)

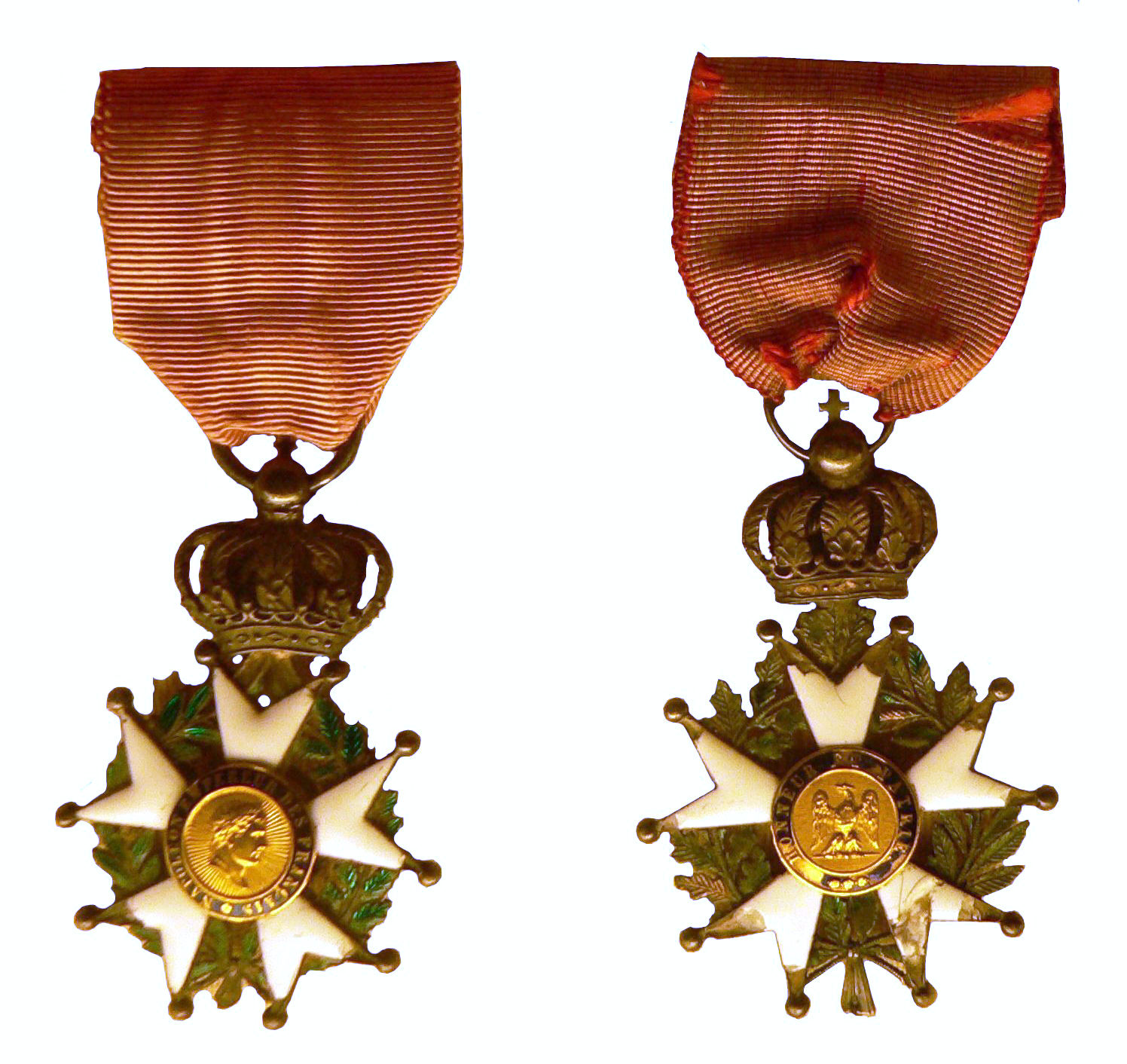
Late Empire Légionnaire insignia: the front features Napoleon's profile and the rear, the imperial Eagle. An imperial crown joins the cross and the ribbon.

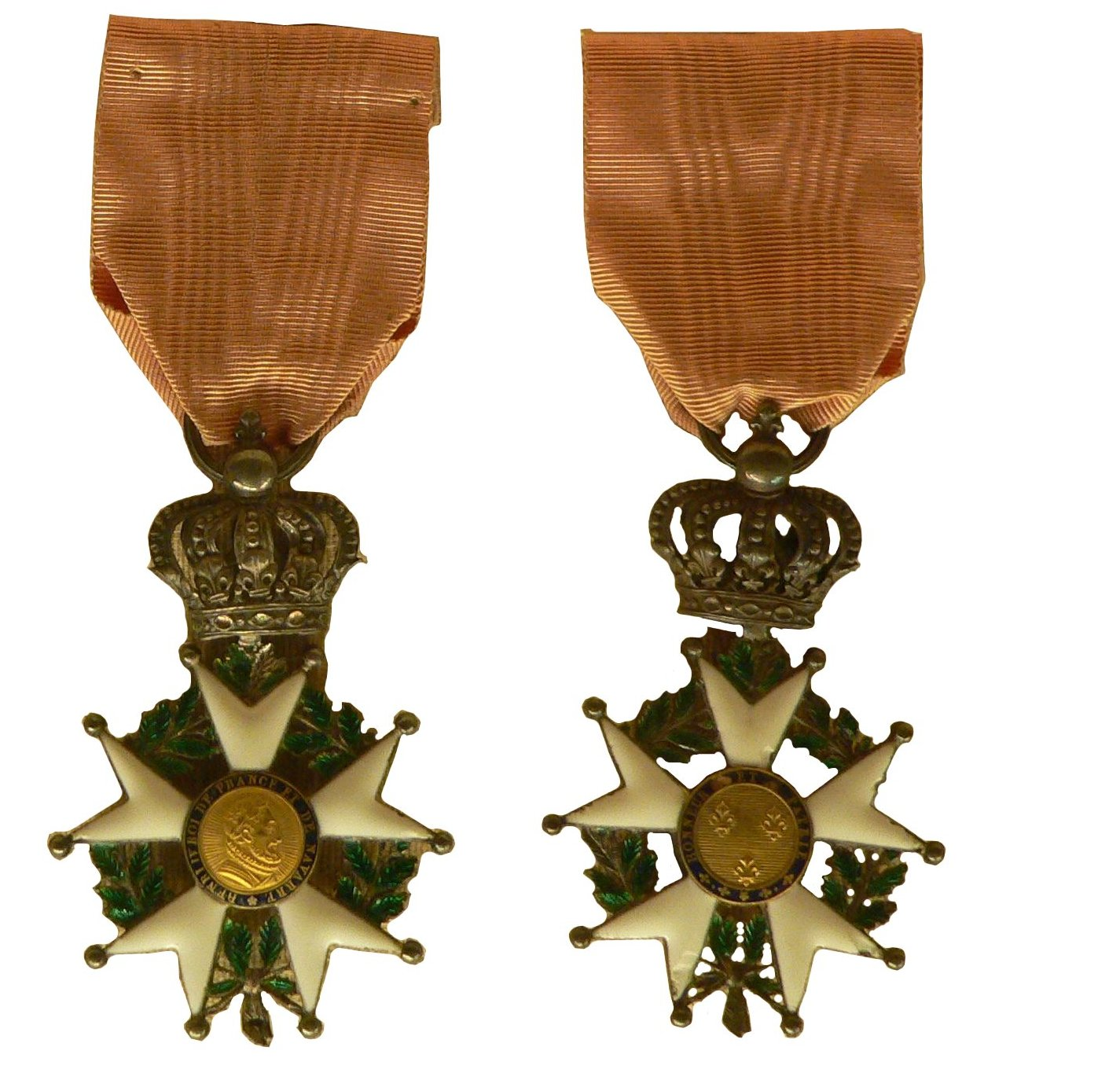
Louis XVIII era (1814) Knight insignia: the front features Henry IV's profile and the rear, the arms of the French Kingdom (three fleurs-de-lis). A royal crown joins the cross and the ribbon.

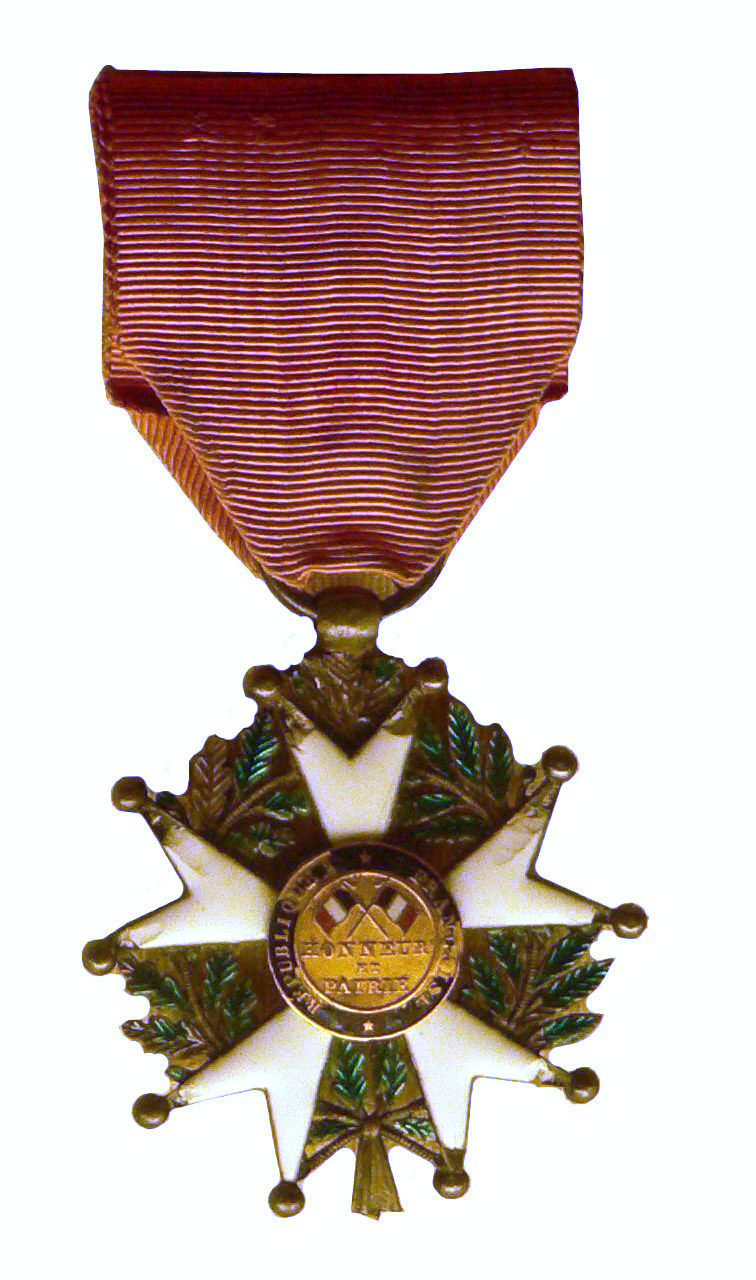
Reverse of a Second Republic cross, with two crossed French flags

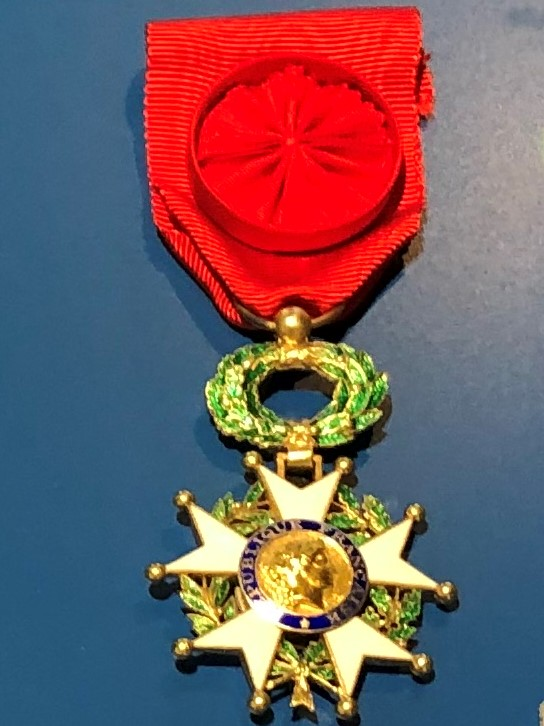
The insignia of an officer class of the Legion d'Honneur from the current Fifth Republic

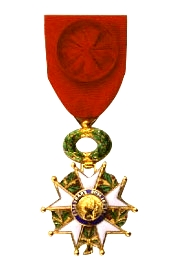
Fifth Republic officer class, decorated with a rosette

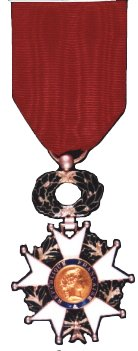
Fifth Republic Knight insignia: the centre features Marianne's head. A crown of laurels joins the cross and the ribbon.

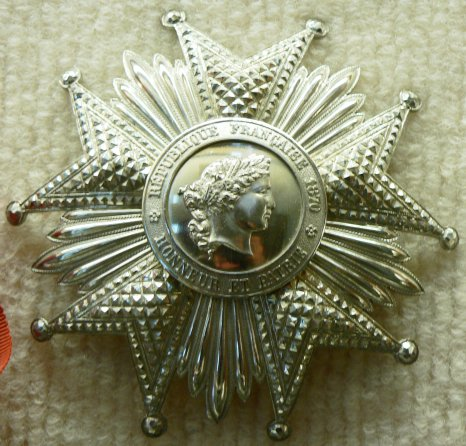
Chiang Kai-shek's Légion d'honneur plaque. In his day, the plaque was not gilded in gold.

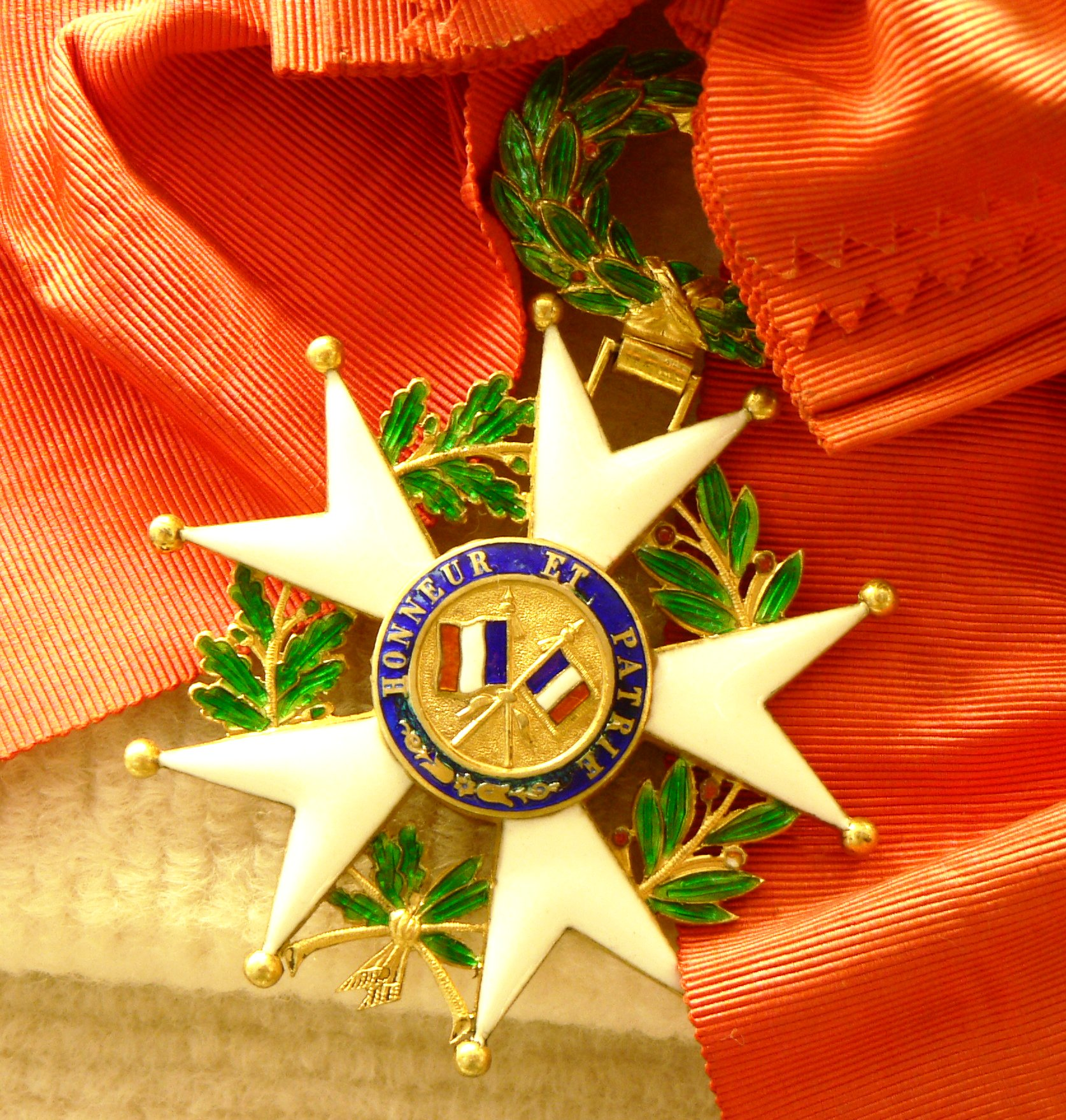
Chiang Kai-shek's Légion d'honneur. This is the reverse of his Grand Cross.

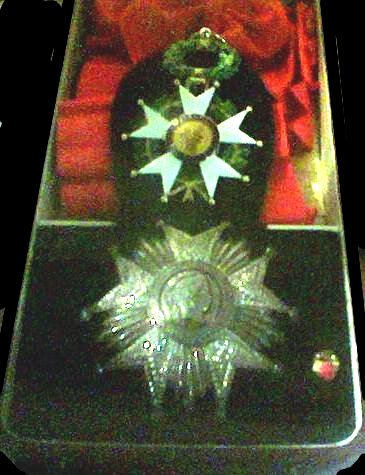
The insignia of a Grand Cross. Nowadays the star of a Grand Cross is gilt. The silver star is the Grand Officer's badge.

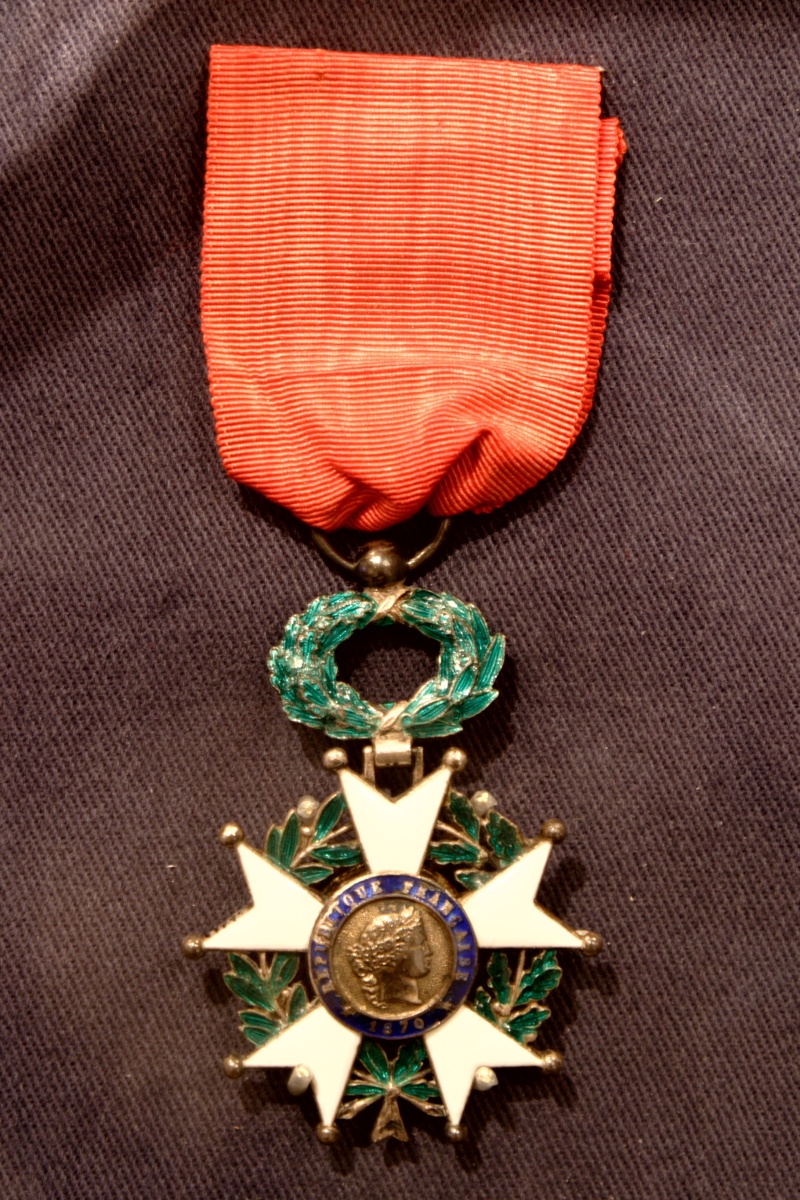
Charles Lindbergh's Legion of Honour

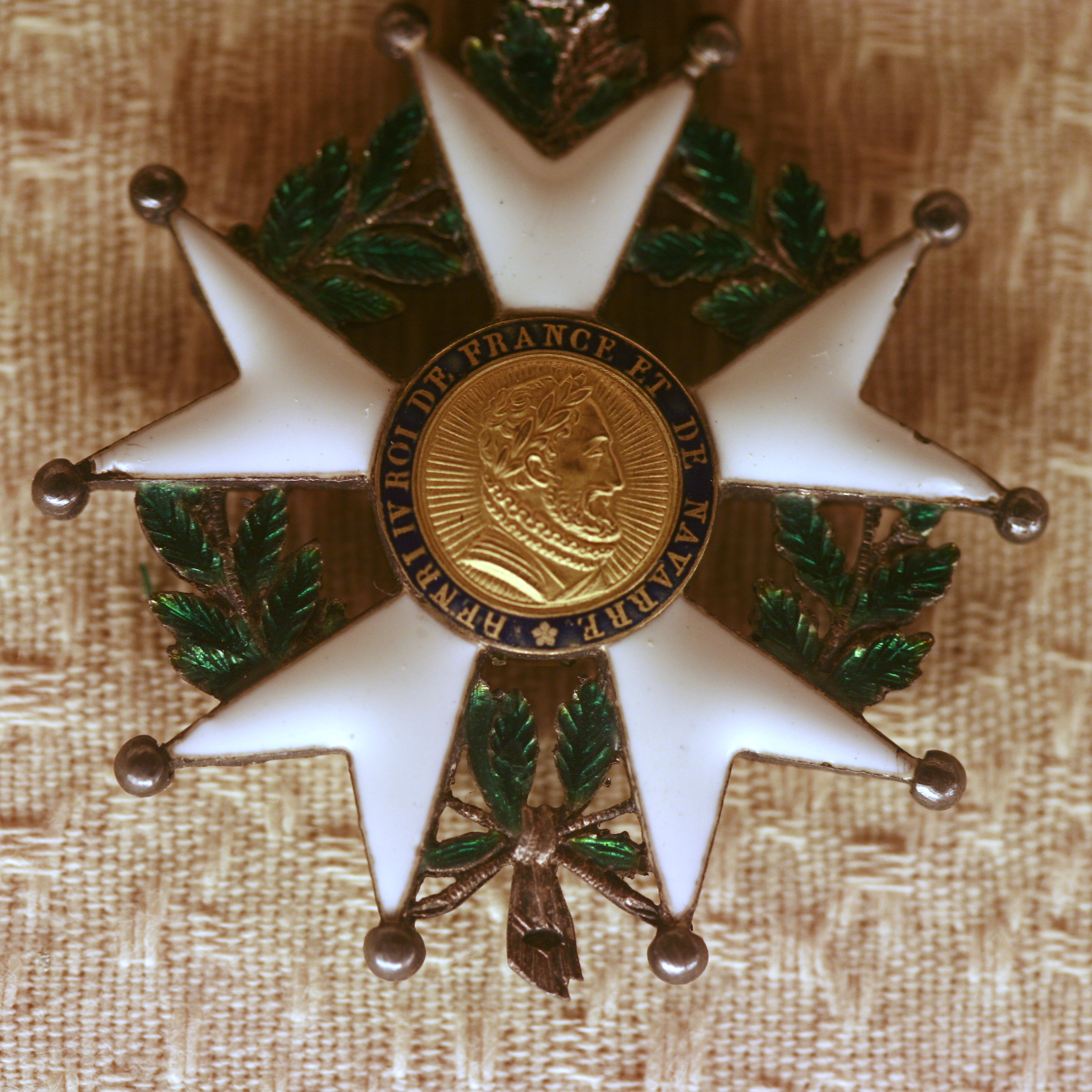
Insignia with figure of Henry IV

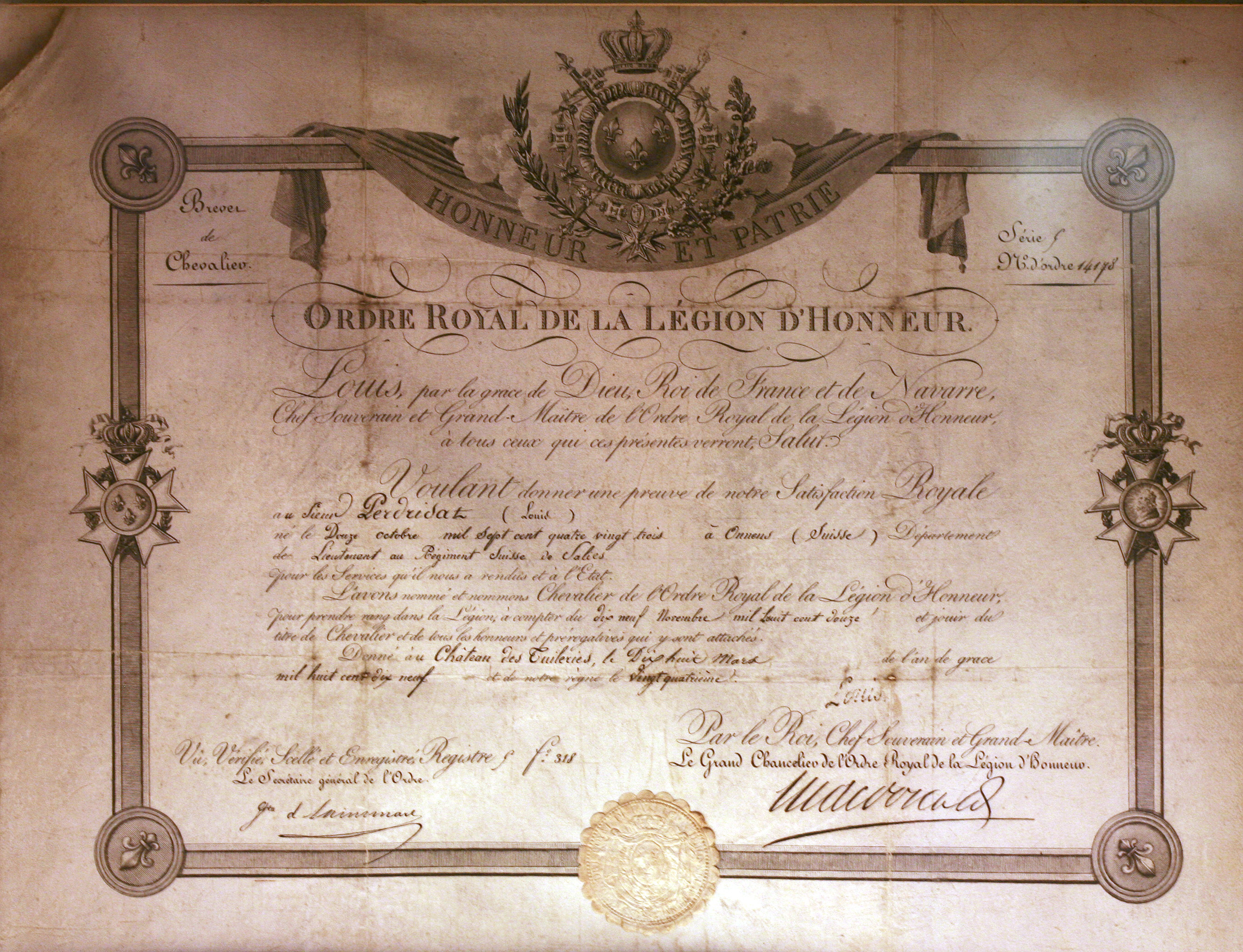
Certificate of the Order of the Legion of Honour

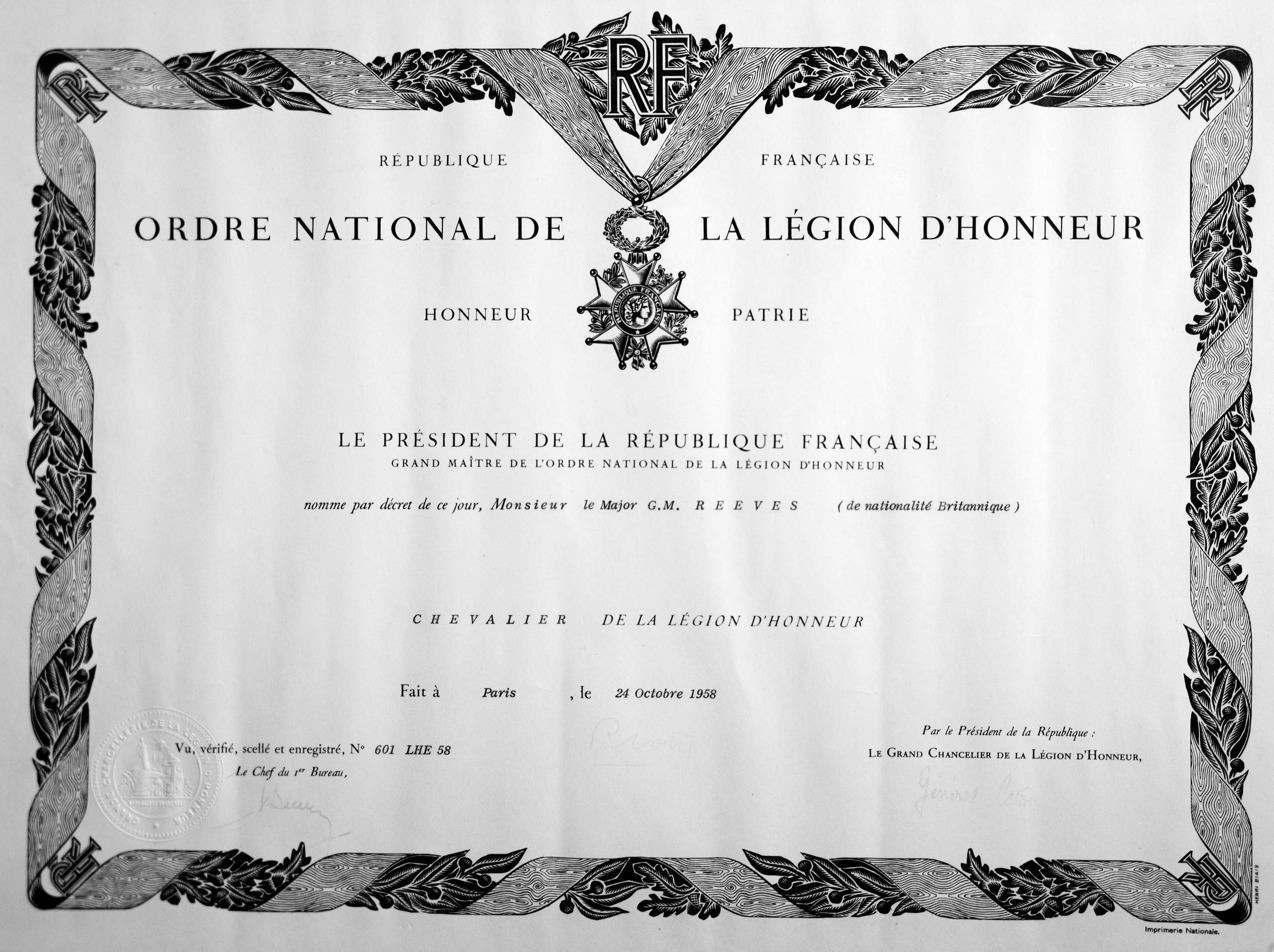
Certificate for Major G M Reeves, a British recipient in 1958

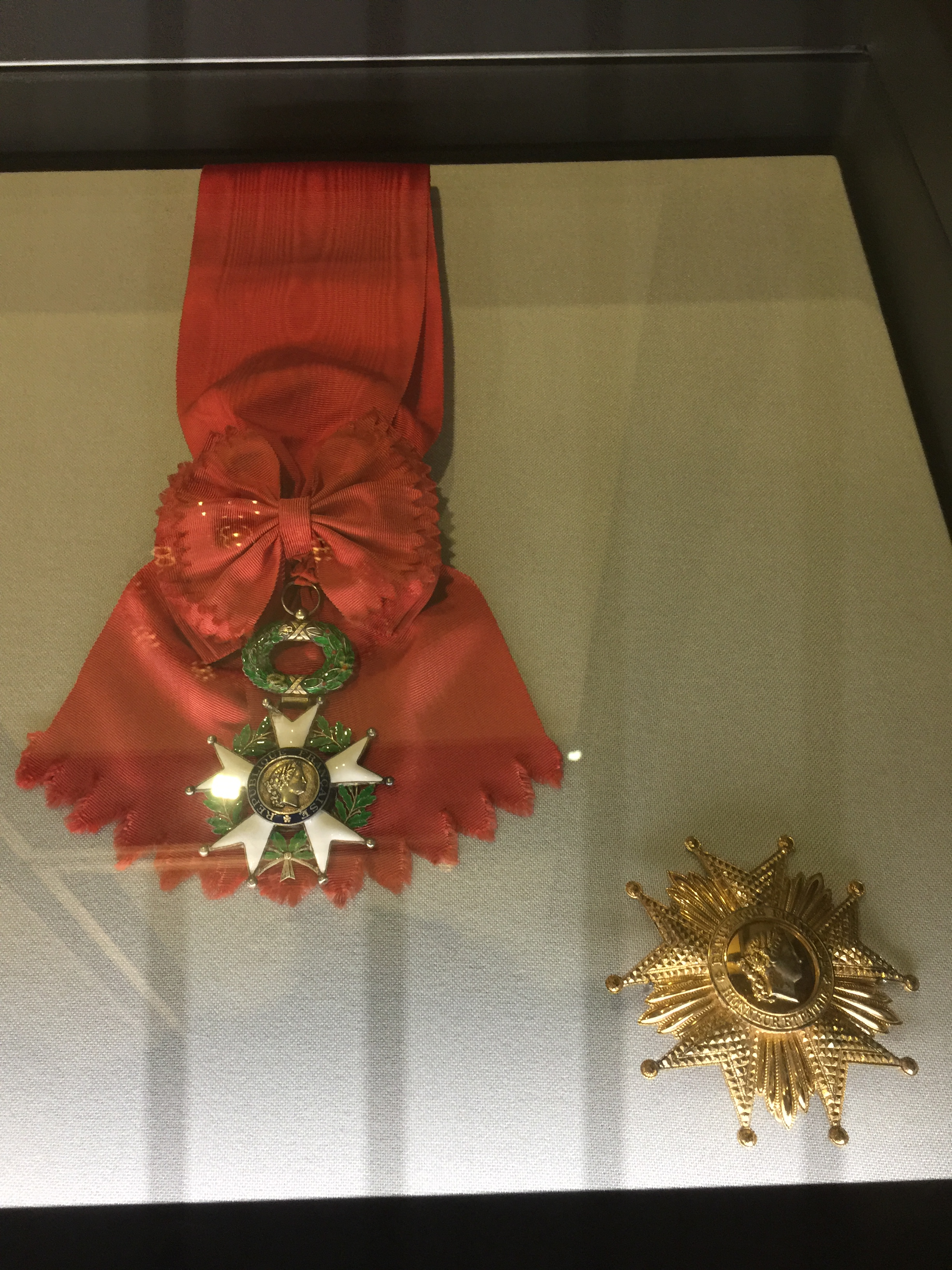
The Grand Cross of the current version of the Legion of Honour

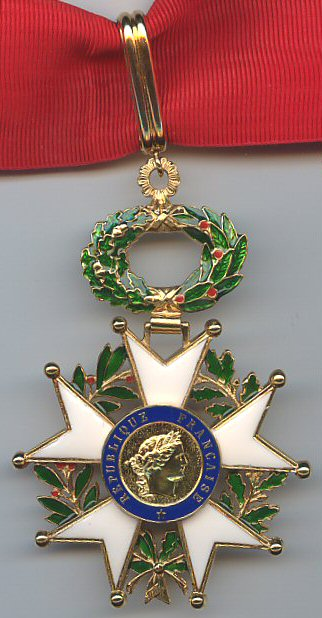
Commander of the Order of the Legion of Honour

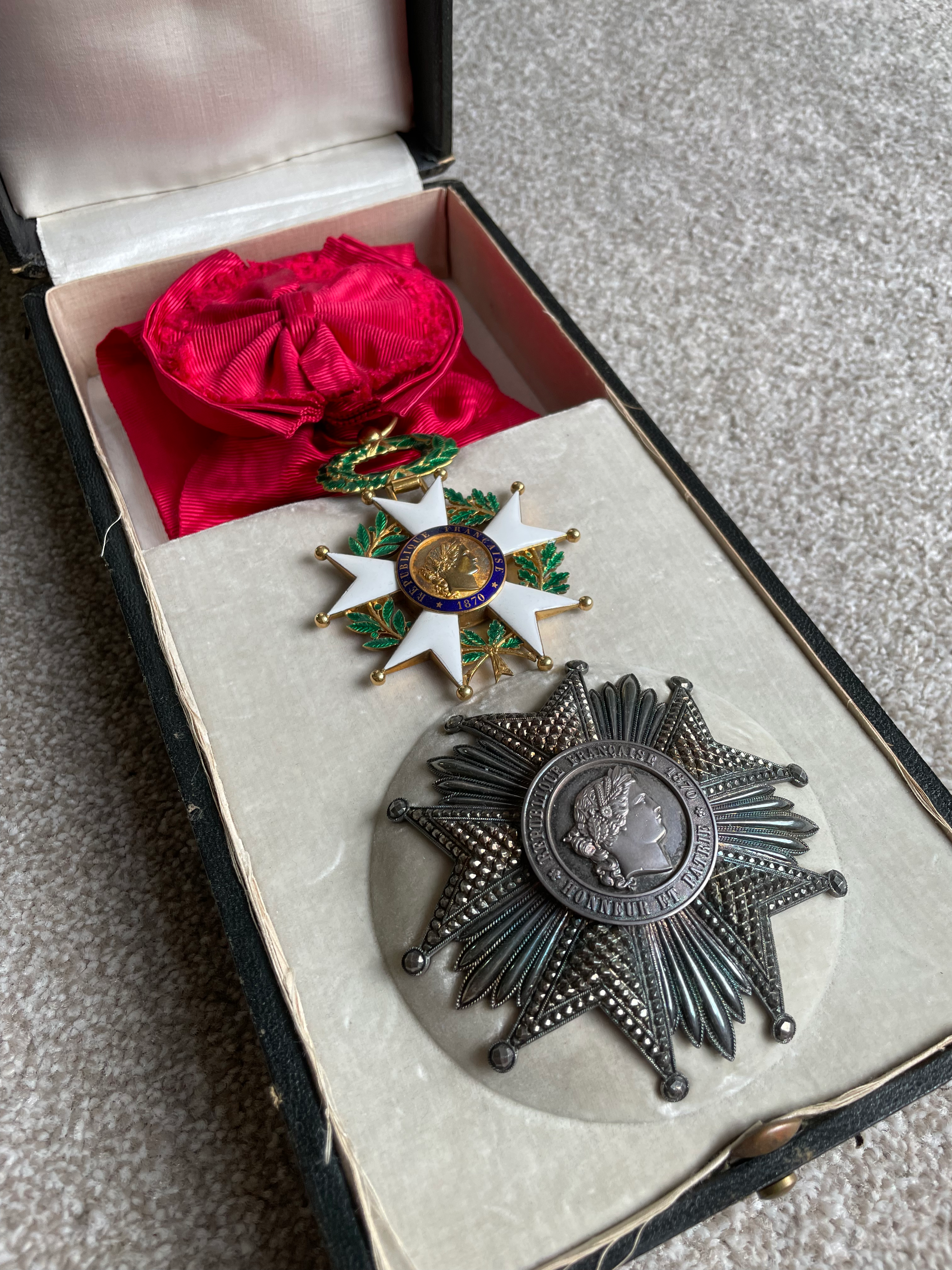
Set of the Grand Cross from the Third Republic, c. 1871, consisting of sash, badge, star and original case of issue by Ouizille Lemoine et Fils of Paris

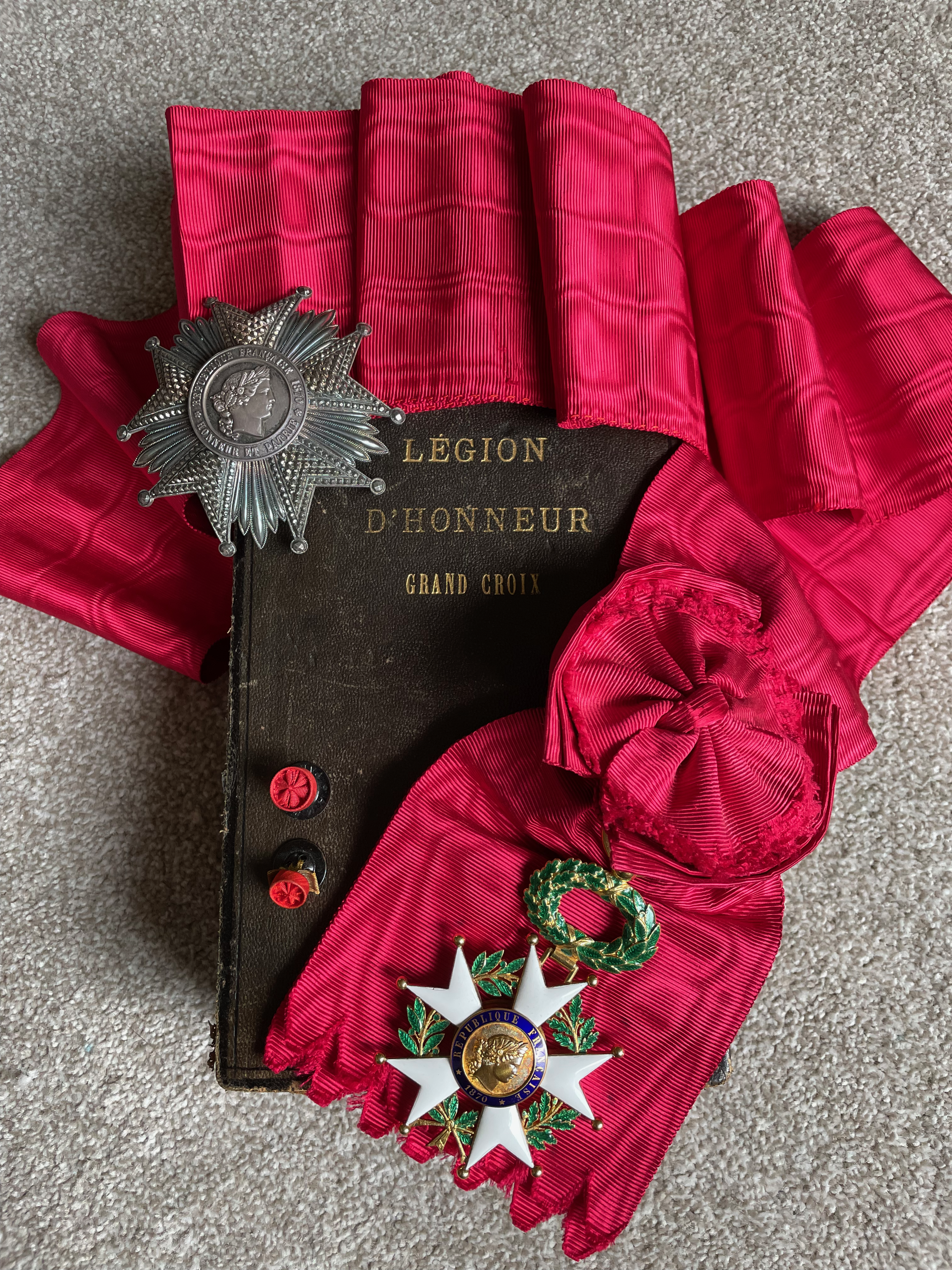
Set of the Grand Cross from the Third Republic, c. 1871, consisting of sash, badge, star, two rosettes and original case of issue by Ouizille Lemoine et Fils of Paris

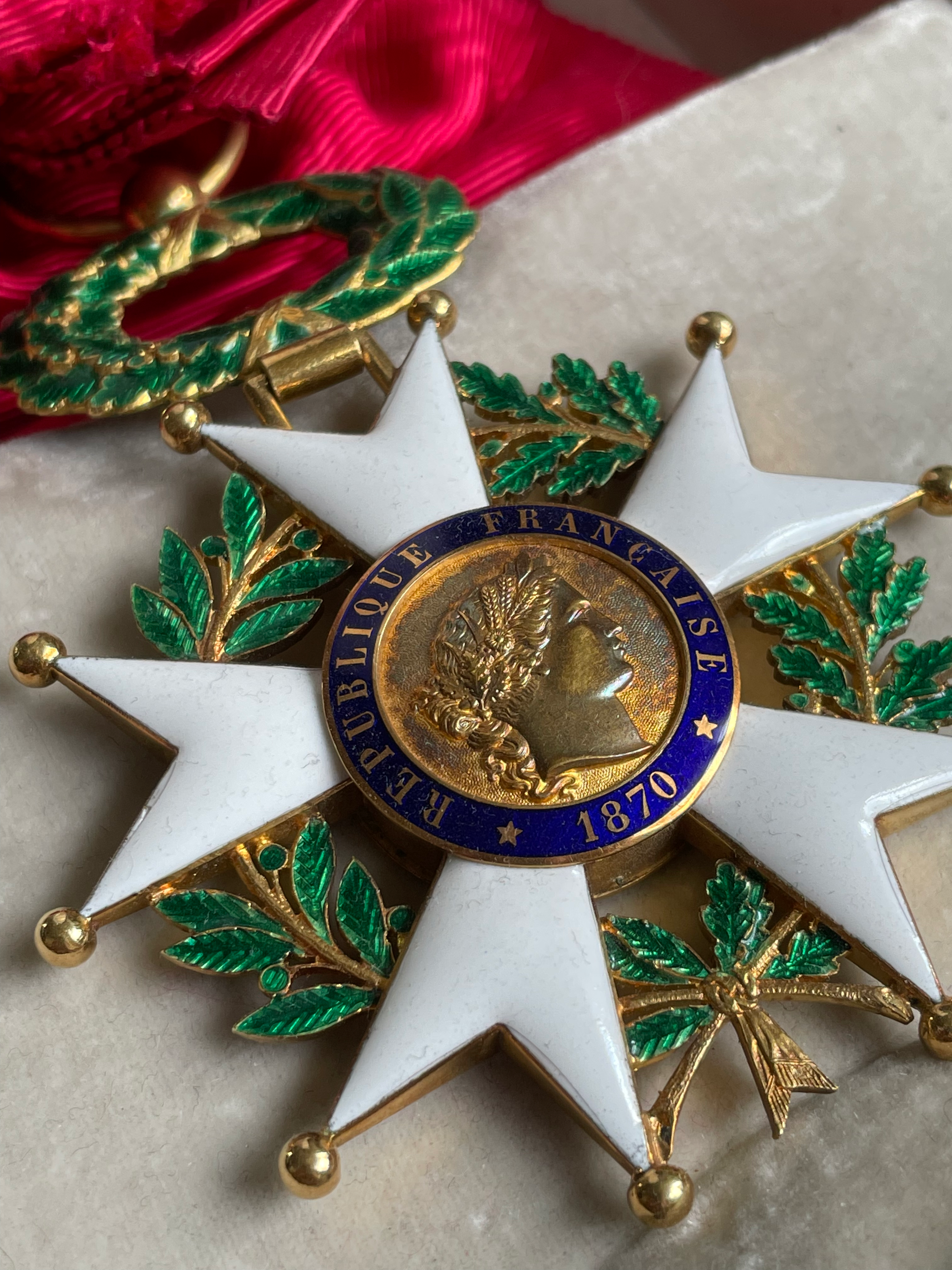
Grand Cross badge of the Legion d'Honneur, in gold, by Ouizille Lemoine et Fils, from the Third Republic (Obverse)

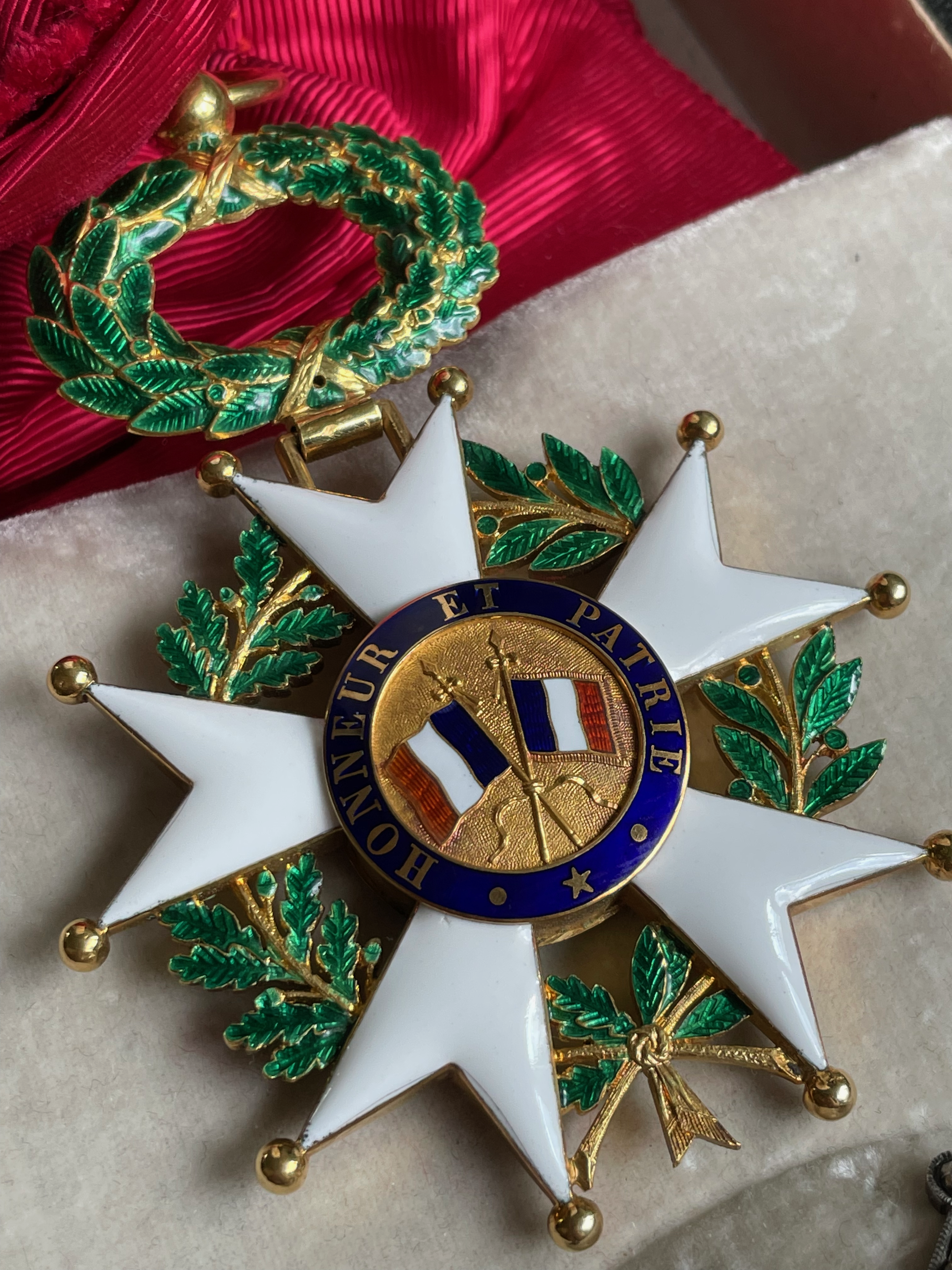
Grand Cross badge of the Legion d'Honneur, in gold, by Ouizille Lemoine et Fils, from the Third Republic (Reverse)

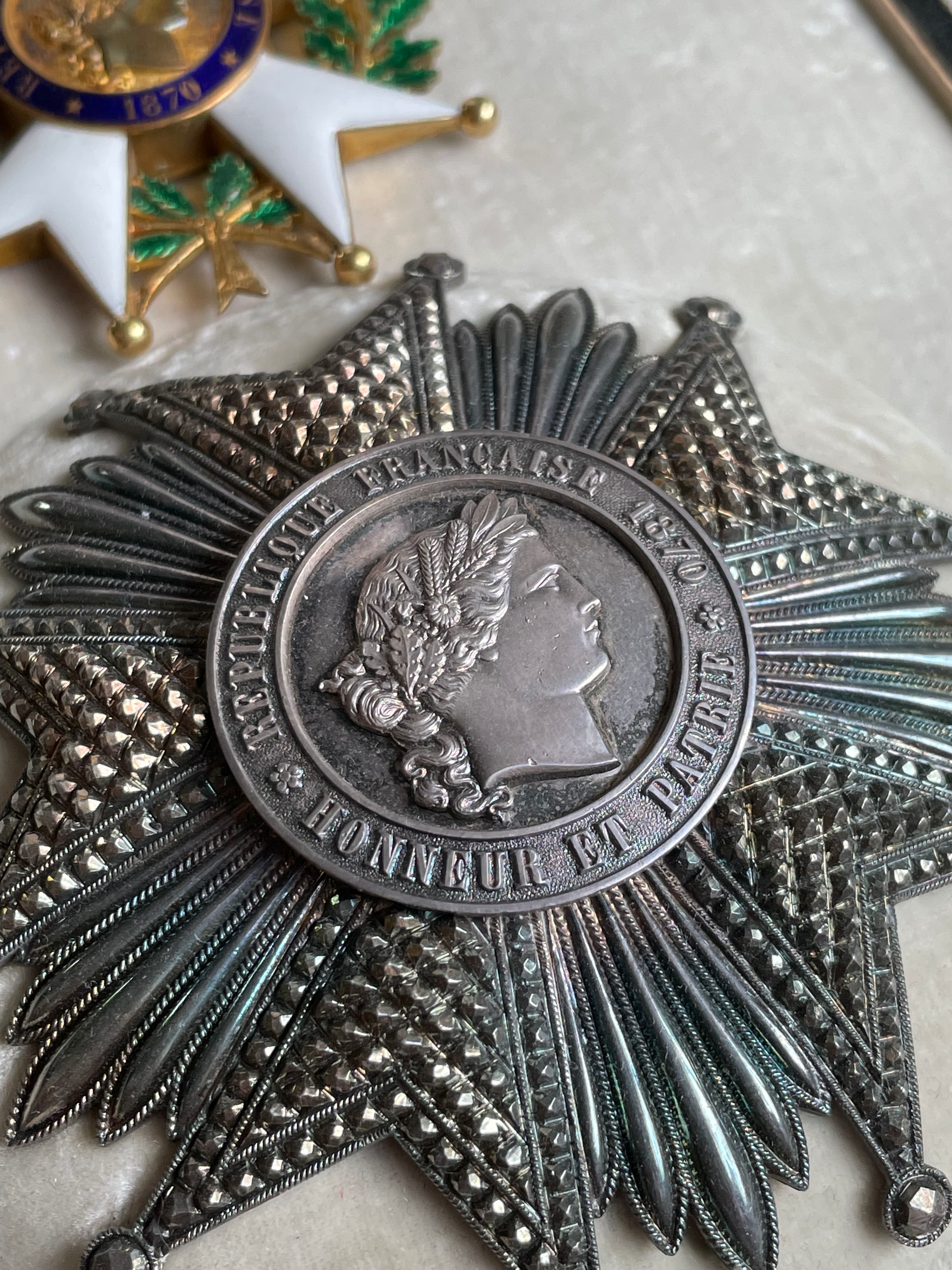
Grand Cross Breast Star of the Legion d'Honneur – Third Republic, c. 1871, by Ouizille Lemoine et Fils Paris

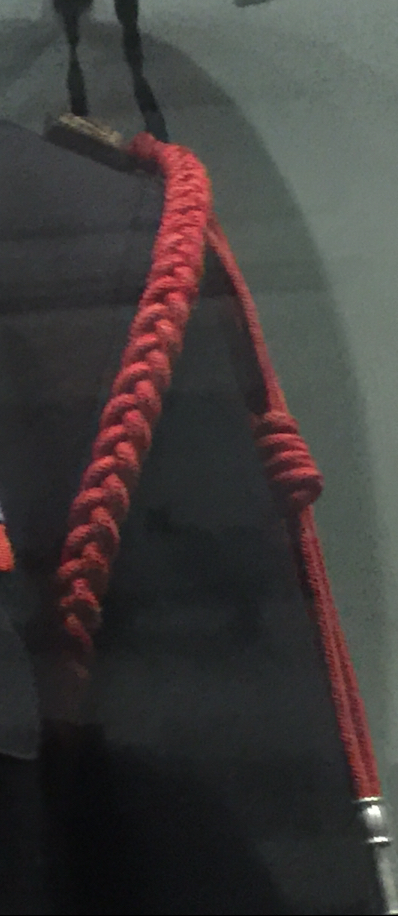
The fourragère of the Legion of Honor

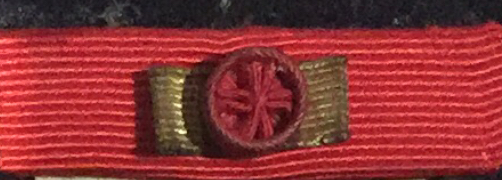
Ribbon Bar of the Grand Cross of the order

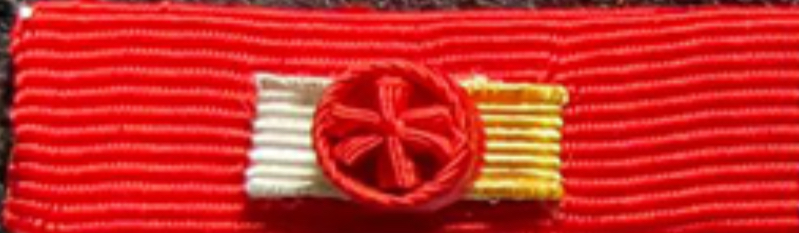
Ribbon Bar of the Grand Officer of the order

Rosette flanked both sides in gold, denoting the wearer has been awarded the Grand Cross of the Legion of Honour

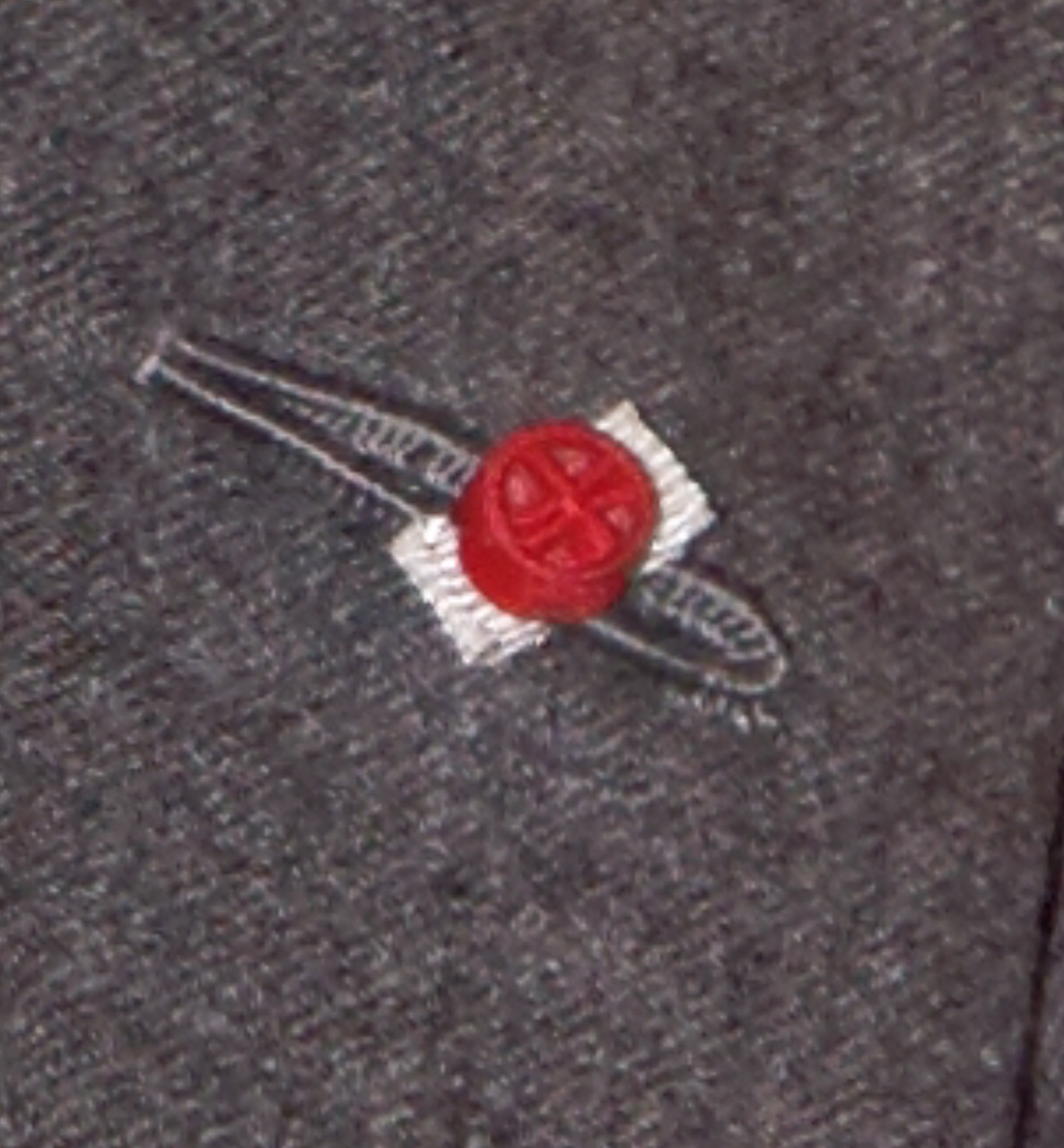
Rosette flanked both sides in silver, denoting the wearer has been awarded the Commander of the Legion of Honour

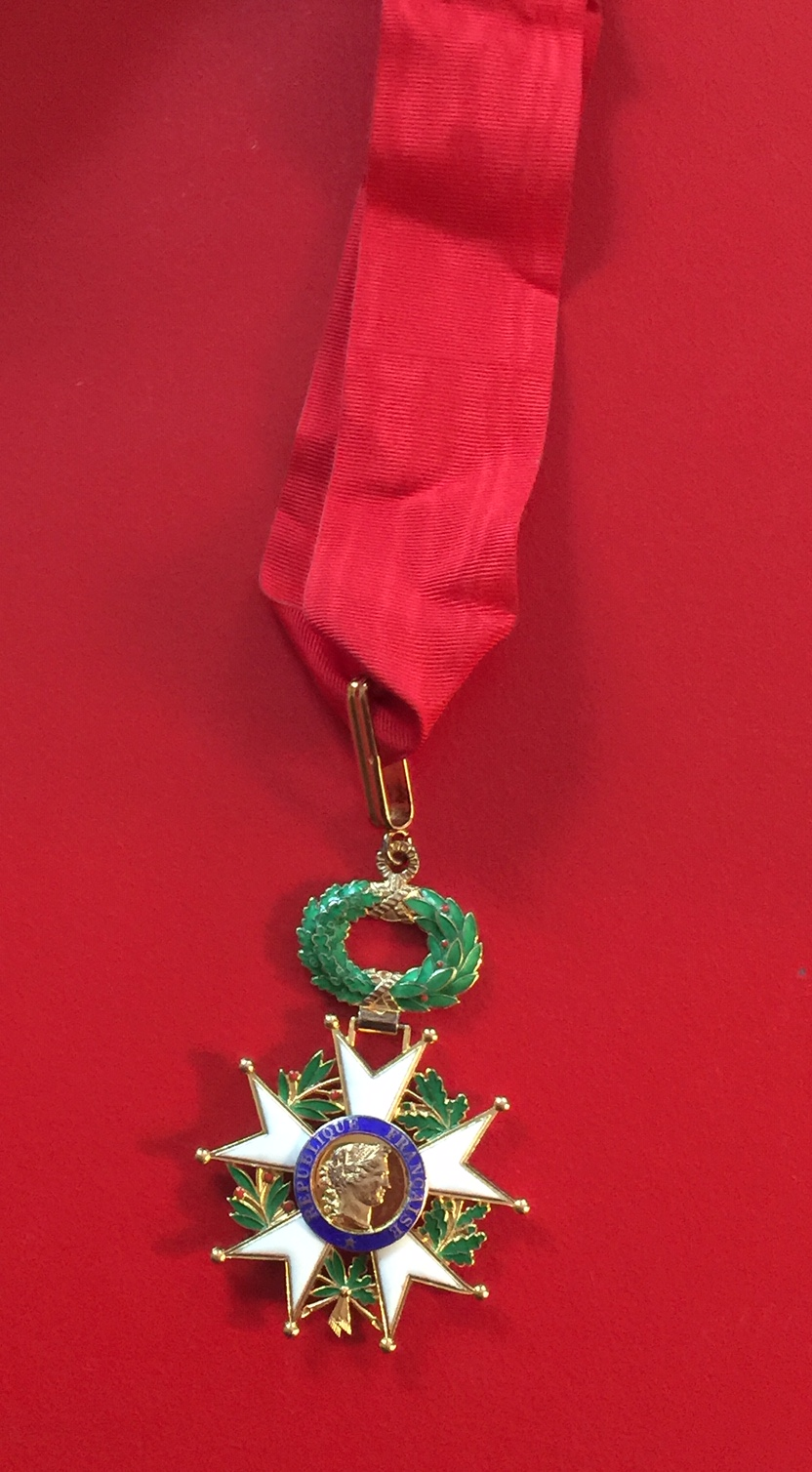
Miniature of the order

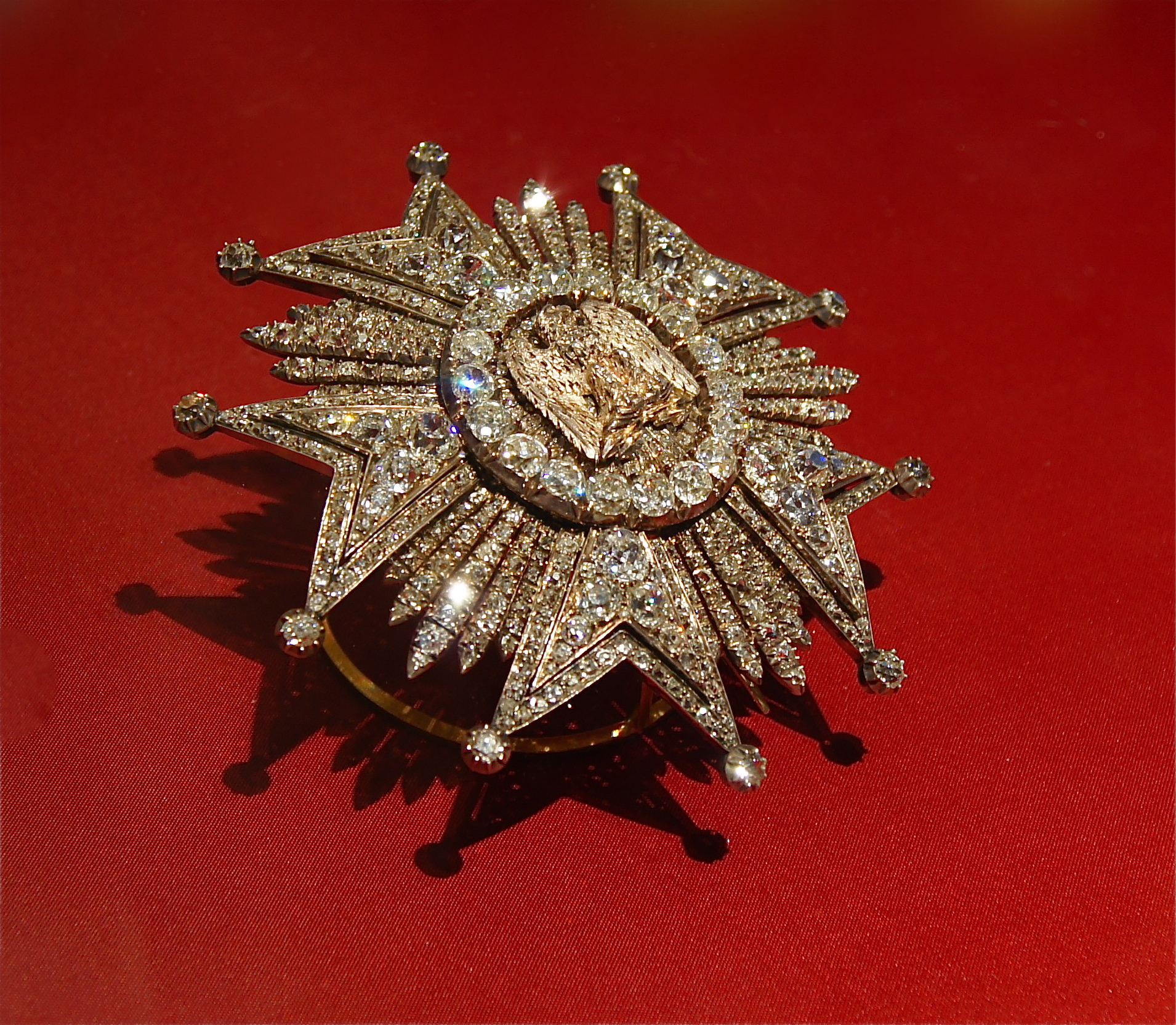
Second Empire Grand Cross star in diamonds

== See also ==
- List of Légion d'honneur recipients by name
- List of British recipients of the Légion d'Honneur for the Crimean War
- List of foreign recipients of the Légion d'Honneur
- Musée national de la Légion d'honneur et des ordres de chevalerie
- Ribbons of the French military and civil awards
