= Marie Schellinck =

Austrian-Netherlands soldier (1757–1840)

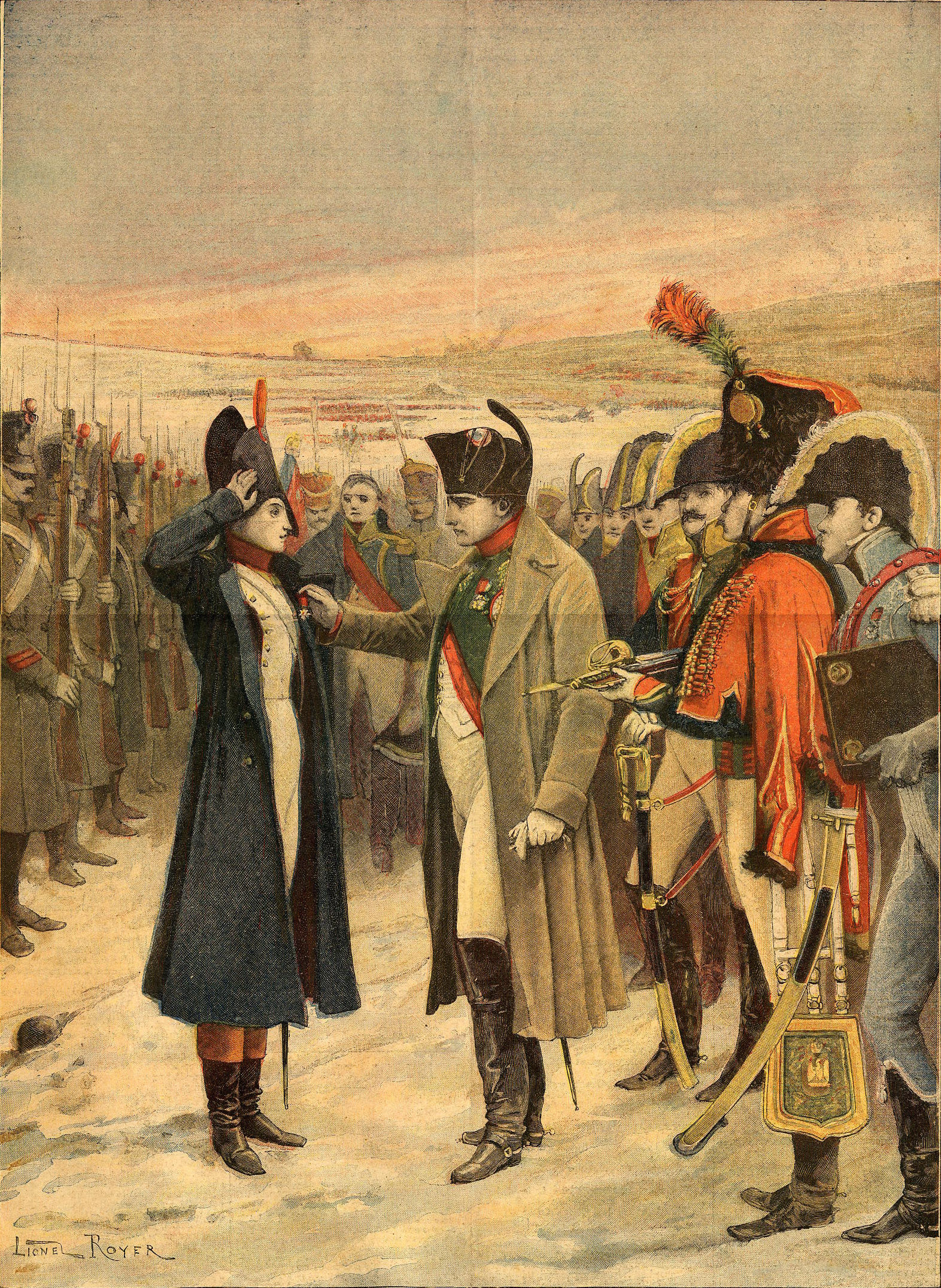
Fictional illustration by Lionel Royer: Napoleon Bonaparte presenting the female officer, Marie Schellinck with a medal on the battlefield, illustration from 'Le Petit Journal', September 1894

Marie Schellinck (25 July 1757, Ghent – 1 September 1840, Menen), also known as Shelling, was an Austrian-Netherlands-born female soldier who fought in the French Revolution.

== Life ==
Disguised as a man, Schellinck enlisted 1792 in the 2nd Belgian battalion of the French army. She most notably took part at the battle of Jemappes in the same year, where she was severely wounded. Four days after the battle, 10 November, she was made sub-lieutenant.

She left military service in 1795/96 when she married lieutenant Louis-Joseph Decarmin. She followed him during the Italy campaign and, after his resignation from service in January 1808, settled with him in Lille.

== Legend of her Legion of Honor ==
A Marie-Jeanne Schellinck is often reported to have been decorated with the Legion of Honor in June 1808 by Emperor Napoleon Bonaparte himself before he rode into Ghent and thus having been the first woman with that merit. This legend is embellished with an impressive list of battles where she was supposed to have fought (Jemappes, Arcole, Marengo, Austerlitz, Jena-Auerstedt and in the Poland campaign 1807), as well as a rousing speech Napoleon gave the assembled soldiers. In 1890, the first image was fabricated that was supposed to show the ceremony. Many repetitions of the legend also allege that Schellinck's service record and testimony from military comrades and commanders resulted in her being granted a pension of 667 livres per year for her service to France.

That story has been proven inaccurate: Napoleon I never distinguished a woman with the Legion of Honor and was located in Bayonne in Southern France in June 1808. The first woman decorated with the Legion of Honor was Angélique Brûlon, who received the Legion of Honor from Napoleon III in 1851.
