= Angélique Brûlon =

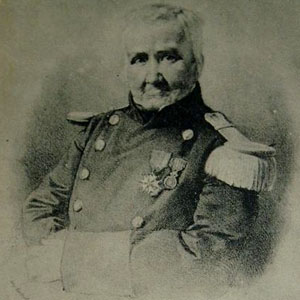
Marie-Angélique Josèphe Brûlon

Marie-Angélique Josèphe Brûlon, née Duchemin (also Angélique Duchemin, 'the widow Brûlon') (20 January 1772 – 13 July 1859), was a French soldier.

Born in Dinan into a soldier family, Duchemin married a soldier named Brûlon and served from 1792 to 1799 in the defence of Corsica.

Initially, Duchemin was a vivandière, ensuring provisions for the soldiers.

In 1791, her husband was killed in Ajaccio; after this, in 1792, at age 21, she enlisted in her husband's former regiment - the 42nd Infantry.

In 1797, she asked to be allowed into Les Invalides after she received severe wounds but was denied for seven years. When she received her pension in 1804, she was also promoted to the rank of lieutenant.

Napoleon III decorated her as a Chevalier (Knight) of the French Legion of Honour on 15 August 1851, the first woman to receive that honor. The first request on her behalf, filed by Marshal Sérurier in 1804, had not been granted. During her decoration, she was recognized for serving for seven years, fighting in seven campaigns, and being wounded three times.
