= Anne Biget =

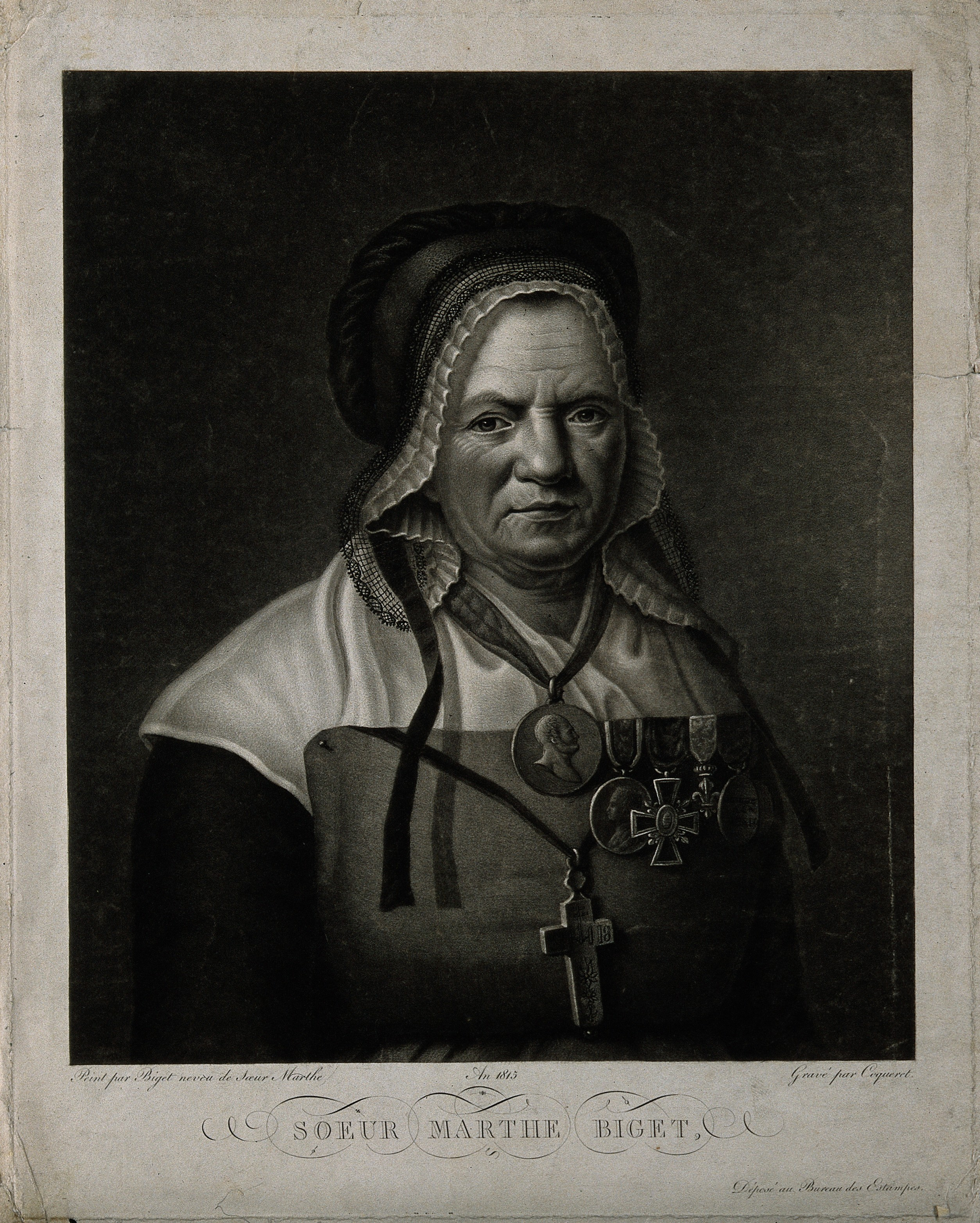
- Born: 1749; Thoraise, France
- Died: 1824; Besançon, France
- Occupation(s): Nurse, nun

Anne Biget, known as Sister Marthe (1749-1824), was a French nun and army nurse.

She was originally a nun in Besançon. When the convents were dissolved in France in 1790, she worked as a nurse in Besançon. She became famous for the care she gave equally to soldiers of all nations during the Napoleonic wars, and was decorated by the rulers of France, Prussia, Austria and Russia.
