= Coronation of Napoleon =

1804 French royal event

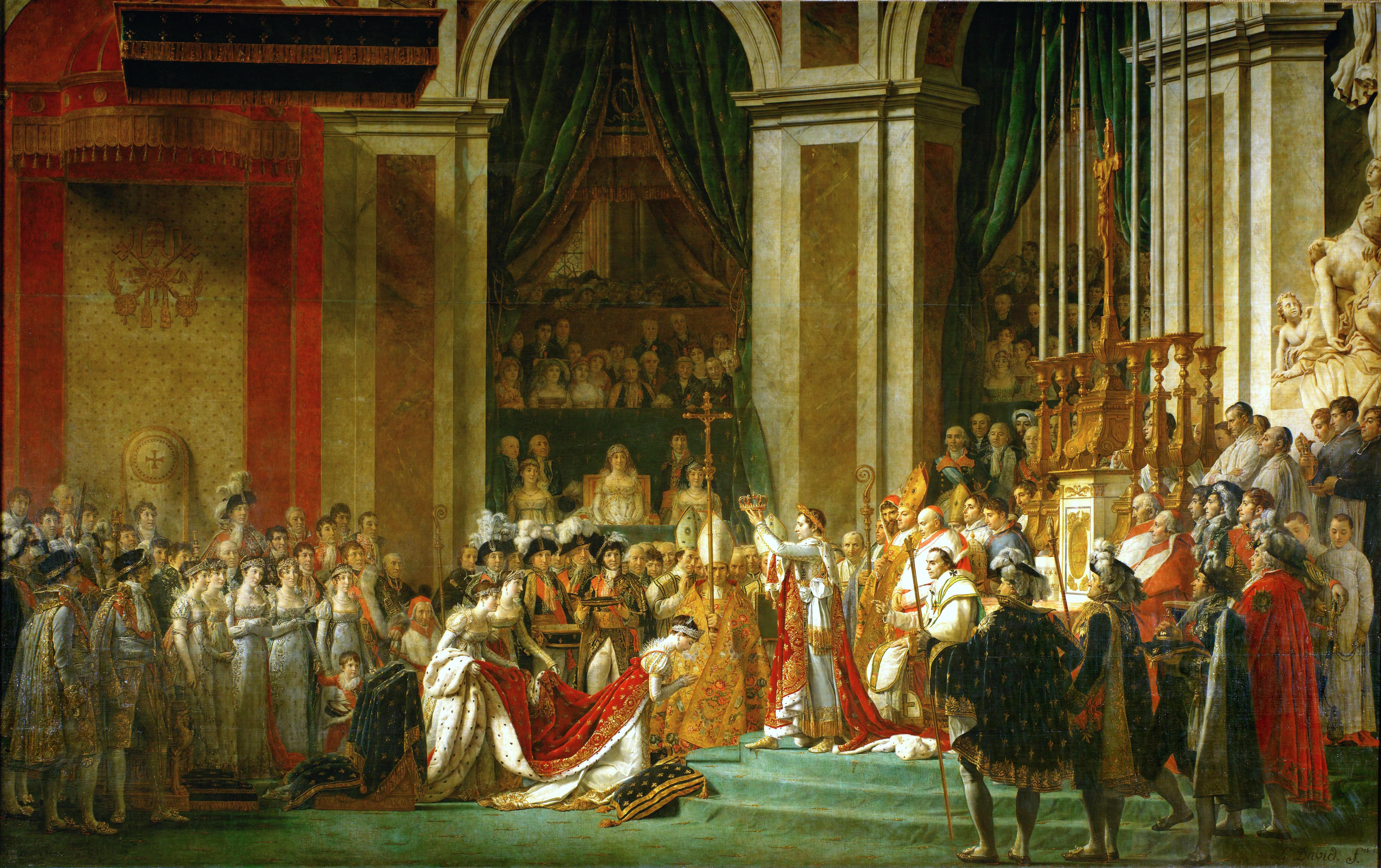
- The Coronation of Napoleon (Jacques-Louis David, 1807)
- Date: December 2, 1804 (11 Frimaire XIII)
- Location: Notre-Dame de Paris, Paris
- Participants: Napoleon, Pope Pius VII, Joséphine de Beauharnais and others

Napoleon was crowned Emperor of the French on December 2, 1804 (11 Frimaire, Year XIII according to the French Republican calendar, commonly used at the time in France), at Notre-Dame de Paris in Paris. It marked "the instantiation of [the] modern empire" and was a "transparently masterminded piece of modern propaganda". Napoleon wanted to establish the legitimacy of his imperial reign with its new dynasty and nobility. To this end, he designed a new coronation ceremony unlike that for the kings of France, which had emphasised the king's consecration (sacre) and anointment and was conferred by the archbishop of Reims in Reims Cathedral. Napoleon's was a sacred ceremony held in the great cathedral of Notre-Dame de Paris in the presence of Pope Pius VII. Napoleon brought together various rites and customs, incorporating ceremonies of Carolingian tradition, the ancien régime, and the French Revolution, all presented in sumptuous luxury.

On May 18, 1804, the Sénat conservateur vested the Republican government of the French First Republic in an emperor, and preparations for the coronation followed. Napoleon's elevation to emperor was overwhelmingly approved by the French people in the French constitutional referendum of 1804. Among Napoleon's motivations for being crowned were to gain prestige in international royalist and Roman Catholic circles and to lay the foundation for a future dynasty.

In 1805, Napoleon was also separately crowned with the Iron Crown as King of Italy in Milan Cathedral.

== Preparations ==
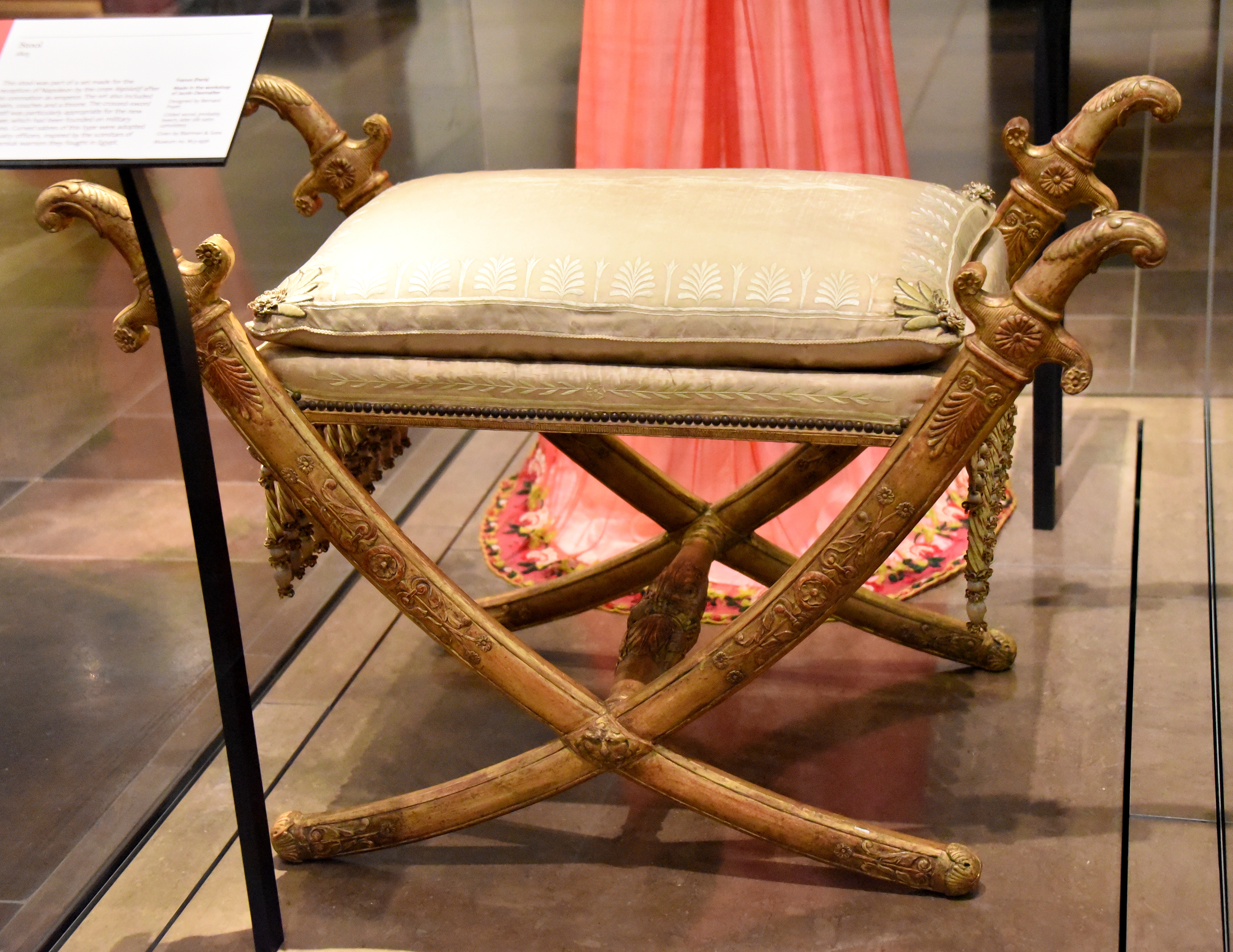
The curule seat that was part of a set made for the reception of Napoleon by the Corps législatif after his coronation as emperor. Made in the workshop of Jacob-Desmalter and designed by Bernard Poyet, 1805

When Pope Pius VII agreed to come to Paris to officiate at Napoleon's coronation, it was initially established that it would follow the coronation liturgy in the Roman Pontifical. However, after the Pope's arrival, Napoleon persuaded the papal delegation to allow the introduction of several French elements in the rite – such as the singing of the Veni Creator Spiritus followed by the collect of Pentecost for the monarch's entrance procession, the use of chrism instead of the oil of catechumens for the anointing (although the Roman anointing prayers were used), placing the sacred oil on the head and hands rather than the right arm and back of the neck, and the inclusion of several prayers and formulas from the coronations of French kings, to bless the regalia as it was delivered. In essence, French and Roman elements were combined into a new rite unique to the occasion. Also, the special rite composed ad hoc allowed Napoleon to remain mostly seated and not kneeling during the delivery of the regalia and during several other ceremonies, and reduced his acceptance of the oath demanded by the Church in the beginning of the liturgy to one word only.

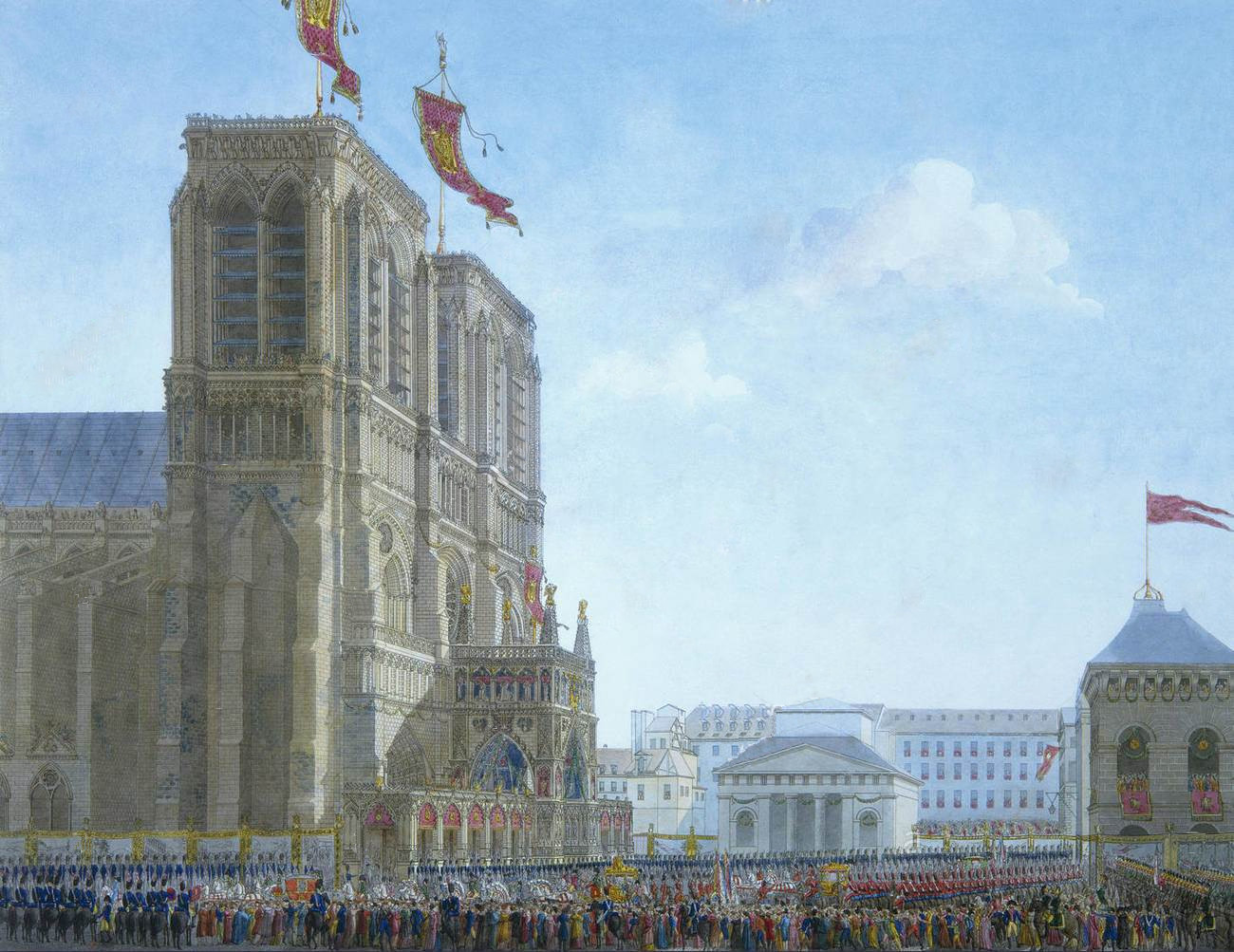
Arrival of Napoleon at Notre-Dame for his coronation

== Ceremony ==
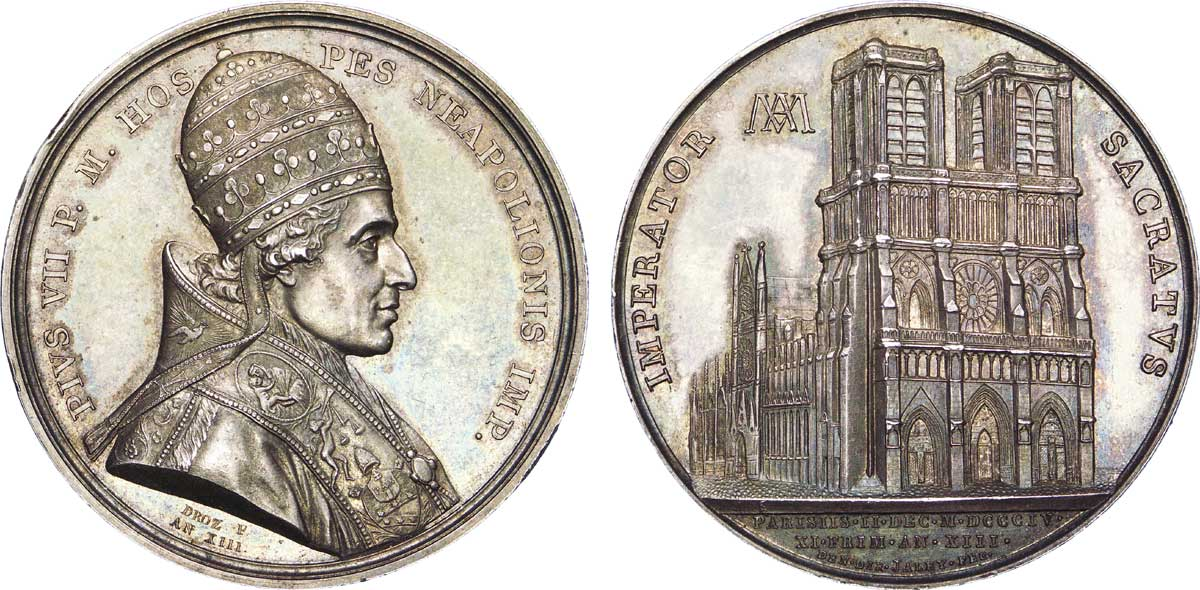
Commemorative medallion with the image of Pope Pius VII on the obverse and Notre-Dame on the reverse. Note that the date on the reverse is given both according to the Gregorian and French Revolutionary calendars.

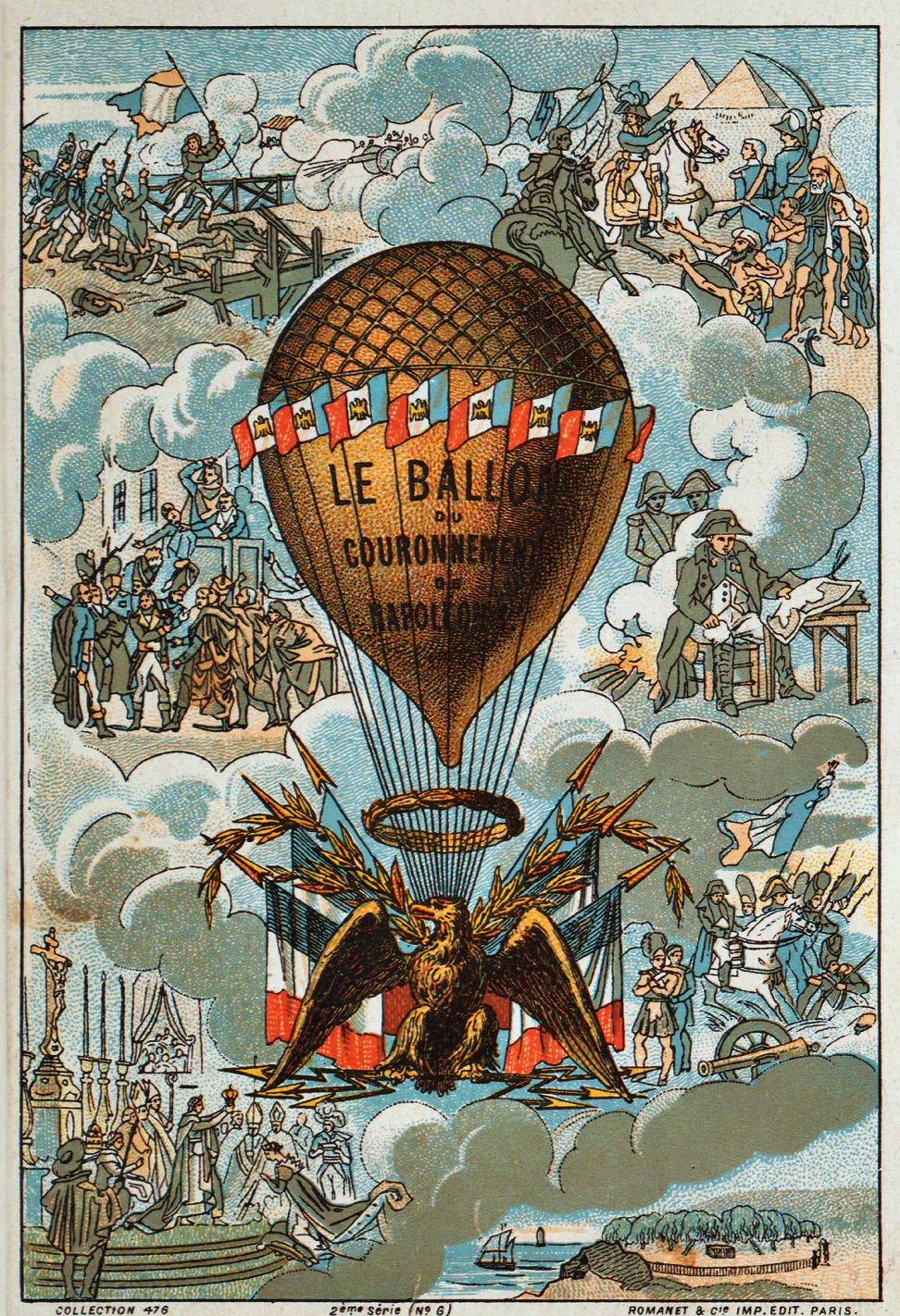
The coronation balloon

According to Louis Constant Wairy, Napoleon awoke at 8:00 a.m. to the sound of a cannonade and left the Tuileries Palace at 11:00 a.m. in a white velvet vest embedded gold embroidery and diamond buttons, a crimson velvet tunic and a short crimson coat with satin lining, a wreath of laurel on his brow. The number of onlookers, as estimated by Wairy, was between four and five thousand, many of whom had held their places all night through intermittent showers that cleared in the morning.

The ceremony started at 9:00 a.m. when the papal procession set out from the Tuileries led by a bishop on a mule holding aloft the papal crucifix. The pope entered Notre-Dame first, to the anthem Tu es Petrus, and took his seat on a throne near the high altar. Napoleon and Josephine’s carriage was drawn by eight bay horses and escorted by Mounted Grenadiers of the Imperial Guard and Elite Gendarmes of the Imperial Guard. (The ormolu fitting from the carriage was owned for several years by American preservationist Jim Williams. It is seen several times in the movie Midnight in the Garden of Good and Evil.) The two parts of the ceremony were held at different ends of Notre-Dame to contrast its religious and secular facets. An unmanned balloon, ablaze with three thousand lights in an imperial crown pattern, was launched from the front of Notre-Dame during the celebration.

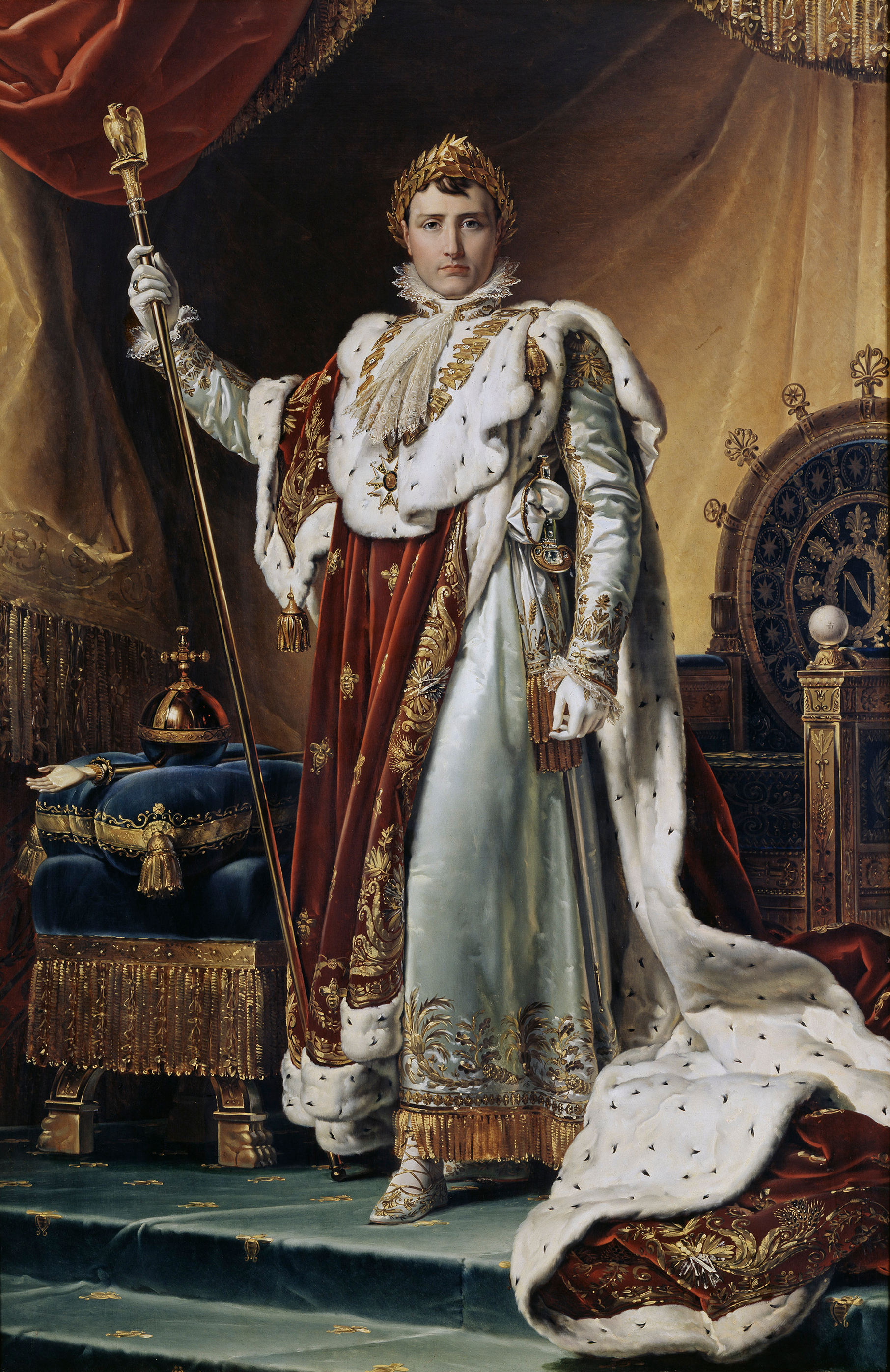
Napoleon in coronation robes by François Gérard

Before entering Notre-Dame, Napoleon was vested in a long white satin tunic embroidered in gold thread and Josephine similarly wore a white satin empire-style dress embroidered in gold thread. During the coronation he was formally clothed in a heavy coronation mantle of crimson velvet lined with ermine; the velvet was covered with embroidered golden bees, drawn from the golden bees among the regalia that had been discovered in the Merovingian tomb of Childeric I, a symbol that looked beyond the Bourbon past and linked the new dynasty with the ancient Merovingians; the bee replaced the fleur-de-lis on imperial tapestries and garments. The mantle weighed at least eighty pounds and was supported by four dignitaries. Josephine was at the same time formally clothed in a similar crimson velvet mantle embroidered with bees in gold thread and lined with ermine, which was borne by Napoleon's three sisters. (Note: There is an anecdotal account that just as Joséphine reached the top of the steps of the high altar to be crowned, Napoleon's sisters deliberately gave her mantle a sudden tug which momentarily caused her to lose her balance, but she did not fall as her sisters-in-law had intended.) There were two orchestras with four choruses, numerous military bands playing heroic marches, and over three hundred musicians. A 400-voice choir performed Giovanni Paisiello's Mass and Te Deum. Because the traditional coronation crown had been destroyed during the French Revolution, the so-called Crown of Napoleon, made to look medieval and called the "Crown of Charlemagne" for the occasion, was waiting on the altar. While the crown was new, the sceptre was reputed to have belonged to Charles V and the sword to Philip III.

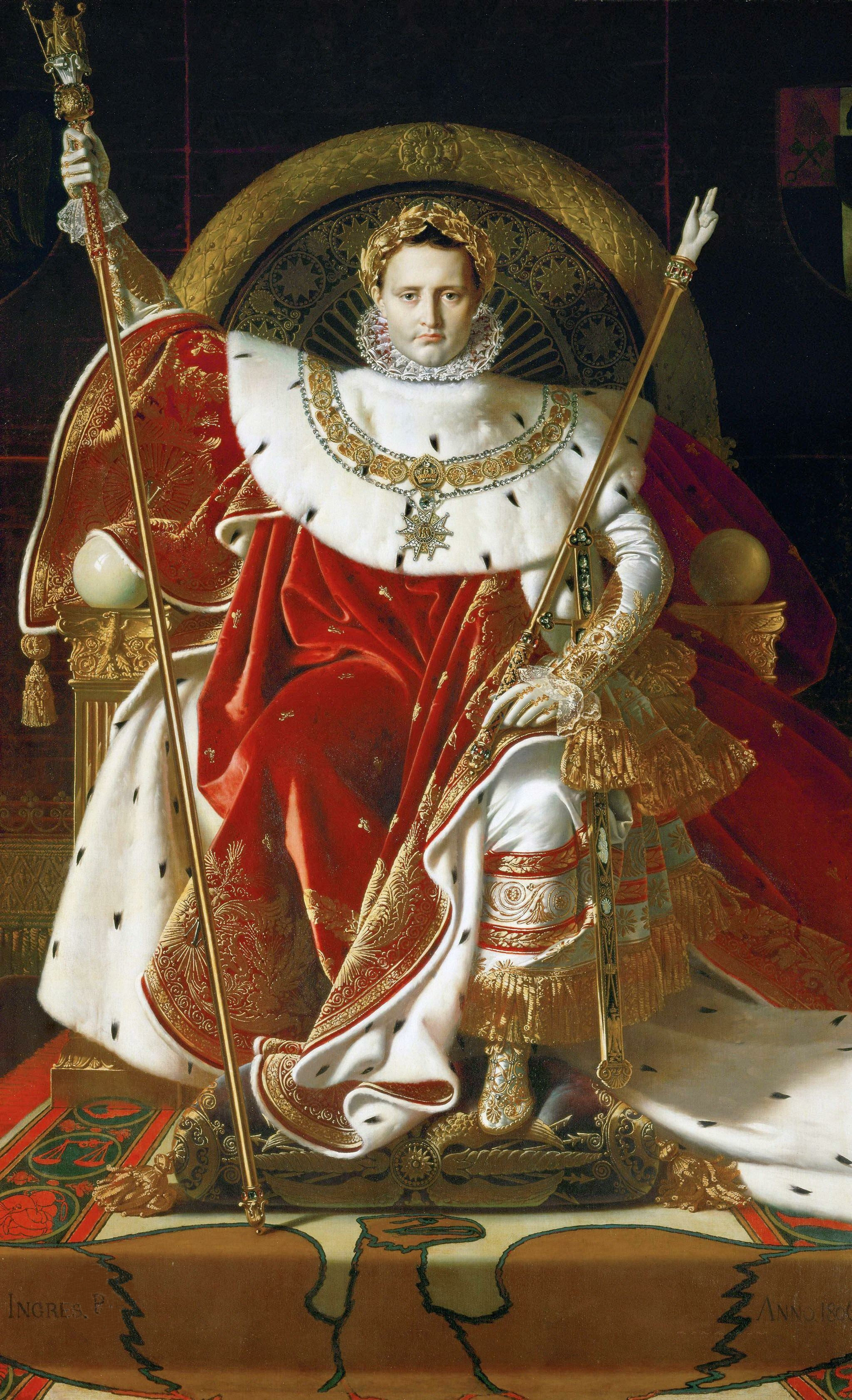
Napoleon I on His Imperial Throne by Jean-Auguste-Dominique Ingres, 1806

The coronation proper began with the singing of the hymn Veni Creator Spiritus, followed by the versicle, "Lord, send forth your Spirit" and response, "And renew the face of the earth" and the collect for the Feast of Pentecost, "God, who has taught the hearts of your faithful by sending them the light of your Holy Spirit,..." After this the prayer, "Almighty, everlasting God, the Creator of all..." (Note: With the substitution of the word "emperor" for "king" and the addition of the words "and of his consort" to the original prayer from the Roman Rite; a similar, but more elaborate prayer, specifically mentioning the "kingdoms of the Franks, the Burgundians, and of Aquitania" existed in the traditional French royal coronation rite.) During the Litany of the Saints, the Emperor and Empress remained seated, only kneeling for special petitions. The Emperor and Empress were both anointed on their heads and on both hands with chrism – the Emperor with the prayers, "God, the Son of God..." (Note: A translation of this prayer may be found at Coronation of the Hungarian monarch) and "God who established Hazael over Syria...", the Empress with the prayer, "God the Father of eternal glory..." – while the antiphon Unxerunt Salomonem Sadoc Sacerdos... (Zadok the priest...) was sung. The Mass then began. At Napoleon's request, the collect of the Blessed Virgin (as the patron of the cathedral) was said in place of the proper collect for the day. After the epistle, the articles of the imperial regalia were individually blessed, (Note: The blessings for the sword, rings, gloves, the Hand of Justice and the scepter were taken from the Cérémoniel françois, while the blessing of the orb was special composed for the occasion.) and delivered (Note: The forms for the delivery of the sword, rings, gloves, Hand of Justice and the scepter were also from the Cérémoniel françois, while that for the delivery of the mantles and the Orb were also specially composed for the occasion.) to the Emperor and Empress. (Note: The forms for the delivery of the rings and the mantles were in the plural, since they were given to the Emperor and Empress simultaneously.)

The coronation of Napoleon and Josephine also differed in this respect from the pattern observed in other Western coronation rites: usually, in joint coronations of sovereign and consort, the sovereign is first anointed, invested with the regalia, crowned and enthroned, and only then is a similar but simplified rite of anointing, investiture, coronation and enthronement of the consort performed. However, for the coronation of Napoleon and Josephine, each of those steps was performed jointly, so that Josephine was anointed immediately after Napoleon, and each item of regalia was delivered to her immediately after being given to him, a procedure that found no precedent either in the Roman Pontifical or in the French Ceremonial.

For the crowning, as recorded in the official procès-verbal of the Coronation the formula Coronet vos Deus..., a variation to the plural of the traditional Latin formula Coronet te Deus (God crown you with a crown of glory and righteousness) – a formula that is also proper to the British coronation rite – was used exclusively, instead of the Roman formula Accipe coronam... (Receive the crown). This differed to the usage of the French royal coronations, in which both formulas – the Roman Accipe coronam regni... and the Anglo-French Coronet te Deus... – were recited successively. While the pope recited the above-mentioned formula, Napoleon turned and removed his laurel wreath and crowned himself and then crowned the kneeling Josephine with a small crown surmounted by a cross, which he had first placed on his own head. The crowning formula was varied to use a plural form ("Coronet vos..." instead of "Coronet te..."), precisely because the Coronation of Josephine followed immediately after the assumption of the Crown by Napoleon. As for the omitted Roman formula Accipe coronam..., which depicted the monarch as receiving his crown from the Church, its use would have clashed with Napoleon's decision to crown himself. Historian J. David Markham, who also serves as head of the International Napoleonic Society, alleged in his book Napoleon For Dummies "Napoleon's detractors like to say that he snatched the crown from the pope, or that this was an act of unbelievable arrogance, but neither of those charges holds water. The most likely explanation is that Napoleon was symbolizing that he was becoming emperor based on his own merits and the will of the people, and not in the name of a religious consecration. The pope knew about this move from the beginning and had no objection (not that it would have mattered)." British historian Vincent Cronin wrote in his book Napoleon Bonaparte: An Intimate Biography that "Napoleon told Pius that he would be placing the crown on his own head. Pius raised no objection." At Napoleon's enthronement the Pope said, "May God confirm you on this throne and may Christ give you to rule with him in his eternal kingdom". (Note: This enthronement formula was a new composition, different from all the variations of the traditional "Sta et retine..." formula usually employed in Western Coronation rites; even the starting words of the formula were different, and in all probability the traditional prayer was abandoned because it specified too clearly that the monarch received the Throne from the bishops and was a mediator between clergy and people. The new formula used for Napoleon's enthronement avoided any mention of this.) Limited in his actions, Pius VII proclaimed further the Latin formula Vivat imperator in aeternum! (May the Emperor live forever!), which was echoed by the full choirs in a Vivat, followed by "Te Deum". After the Mass was finished, the pope retired to the Sacristy, as he objected to presiding over or witnessing the civil oath that followed, due to its contents. With his hands on the Bible, Napoleon took the oath:

I swear to maintain the integrity of the territory of the Republic, to respect and enforce respect for the Concordat and freedom of religion, equality of rights, political and civil liberty, the irrevocability of the sale of national lands; not to raise any tax except in virtue of the law; to maintain the institution of Legion of Honour and to govern in the sole interest, happiness and glory of the French people.

The text was presented to Napoleon by the President of the Senate, the President of the Legislature, and the most senior President of the Council of State. After the oath the newly appointed herald of arms proclaimed loudly: "The thrice glorious and thrice august Emperor Napoleon is crowned and enthroned. Long live the Emperor!" During the people's acclamations Napoleon, surrounded by dignitaries, left the cathedral while the choir sang "Domine salvum fac imperatorem nostrum Napoleonem" (God save our Emperor Napoleon).

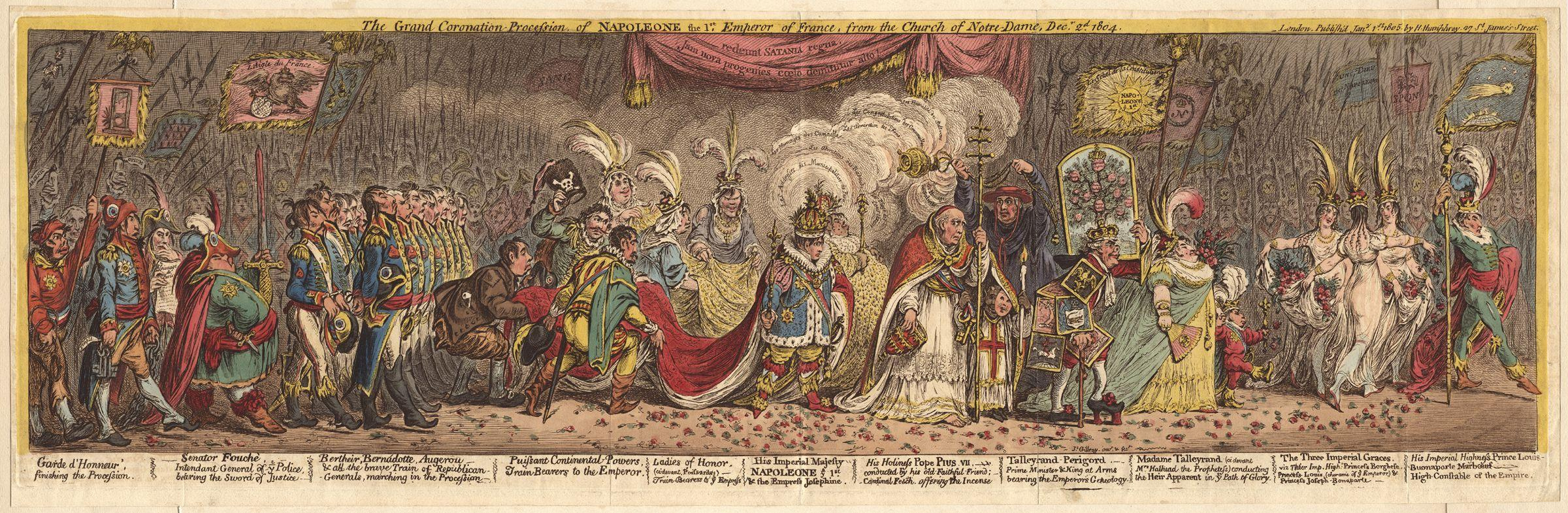
Cartoon by James Gillray mocking the coronation

After the coronation the Emperor presented the imperial standards to each of his regiments. According to government tallies, the entire cost was over 8.5 million francs.

In addition to Jacques-Louis David's paintings, including the famous The Coronation of Napoleon, a commemorative medal was struck with the reverse design by Antoine-Denis Chaudet. In 2005, a digital depiction of the coronation was made by Vaughan Hart, Peter Hicks, and Joe Robson for the "Nelson and Napoleon" Exhibition at the National Maritime Museum.

== See also ==
- Napoleon Tiara
