= Scepter of Charles V =

Medieval royal scepter made for Charles V of France

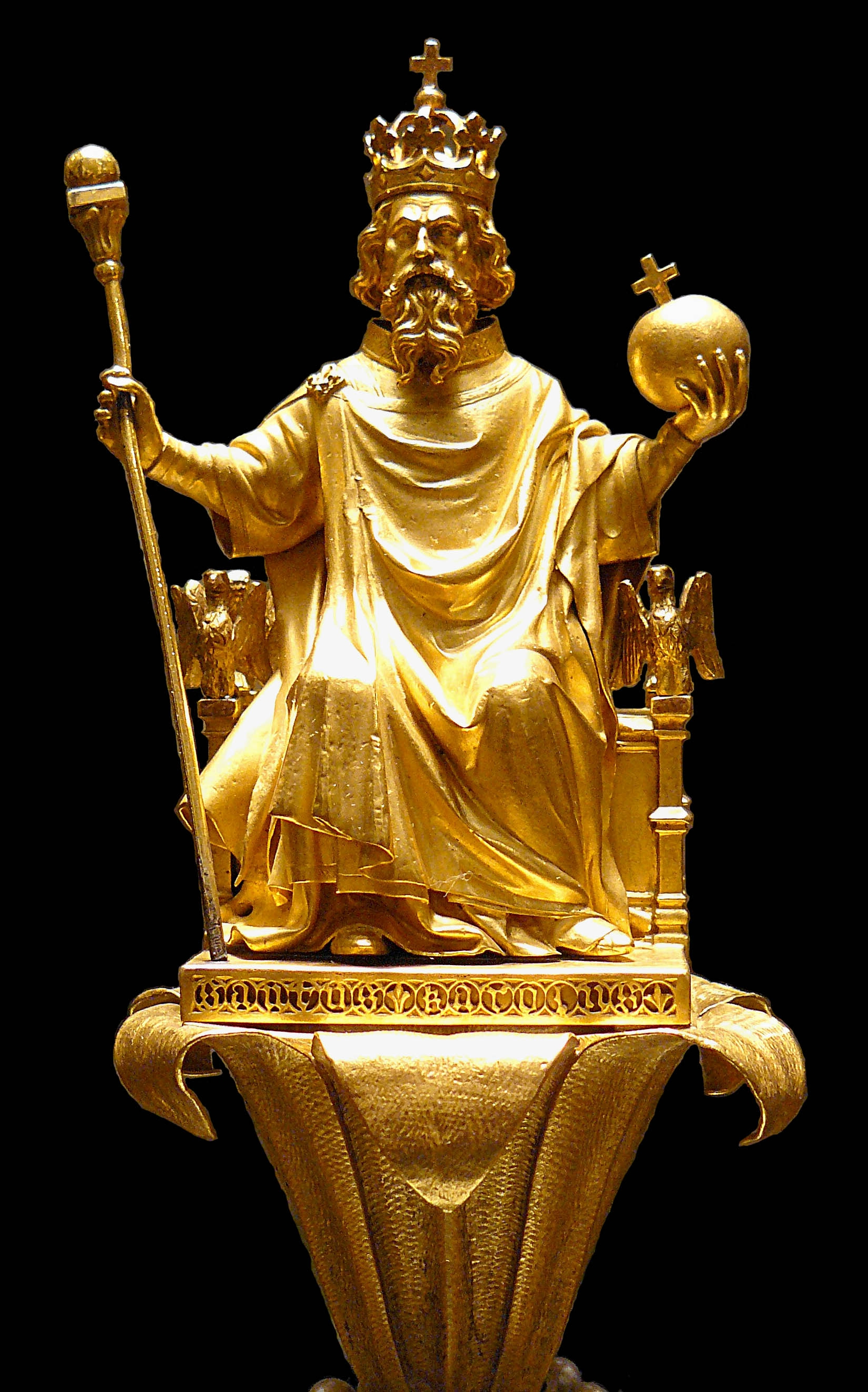
Upper section of the scepter, with the fleur-de-lis and statuette of Charlemagne

The scepter of Charles V, also known in the early modern period as scepter of Charlemagne, is one of the most prominent preserved regalia of the Kingdom of France. It was donated by Charles V to the abbey of Saint-Denis on 7 May 1380, shortly before his death. It has been used since for the coronation (sacre) of nearly all monarchs of France until Charles X, only excepting Charles VII and Henri IV. It has been kept at the Louvre since 5 December 1793.

== Description ==
The scepter consists of four elements: a shaft, a bulb, a fleur-de-lis, and a seated figure of Charlemagne on top. The bulb is decorated with three scenes from the Historia Caroli Magni. Legend of Charlemagne: Saint James appearing to Charlemagne and commanding him to go and save Spain; the miraculous blossoming of spears of those going off to die in battle; and Saint James’s wrenching of Charlemagne’s soul from the Devil

Charlemagne is represented holding a scepter and globus cruciger. The Sceptre at this time measured 3 feet 9 inches and weighed 2.2 kg. The shaft was engraved with a rosette and fleur-de-lis and was screwed together in five pieces.

An inscription at the base of Charlemagne's seat reads "SANTUS [sic] KAROLUS MAGNUS ITALIA ROMA GALIA ET [?] ALIA". A reading of "...ET GERMANIA" was proposed in the 16th century but is incompatible with the preserved object.

== History ==
In 1379 Charles V commissioned a collection of items for the use of his son Charles’s VI coronation. The Sceptre may have already been partially realized, in 1364, for the coronation of Charles V. The illuminations of the Coronation Ordo of Charles V of 1365 show a similar sceptre in the hands of the king. Shortly before Charles V's death, they were placed in the Treasury of the Abbey of Saint-Denis for their preservation. The Sceptre has been attributed to court goldsmith Hennequin du Vivier.

The Sceptre was used in all the coronations of the French kings from 1380 to 1775 with the exception of Charles VII, possibly due to the Hundred Years' War, and Henry IV, possibly because the coronation was not held in Reims. Each new French king's acceptance of the Sceptre symbolized the transfer of divine authority and the responsibilities of kingship as well as a connection to Charlemagne.

The Sceptre has been repaired on multiple occasions, including in 1722,1775, 1804 and 1825. The crown is not original and was replaced at some date before 1624. The scepter held by Charlemagne and one of the eagles on his seat are also replacements.

The history of the Sceptre is punctuated with the repeated transports between Saint-Denis and Reims (about 144 km apart), which was not always done in the most suitable conditions for this preservation of the objects. Accounts of the coronation of Charles VIII in 1484, describe the instruments of the coronation enclosed in a chest and transported in a ‘shaky’ trolley in which pieces of the instruments broke during the journey to and from the Reims.

Henry II in 1547, found that the regalia was worn and had them repaired. Cases were made for the Sceptre and the crowns as well. In 1722, in anticipation of the coronation of Louis XV, cases were made for the Sceptre, the Hand of Justice and the clasp, but the objects, poorly placed, shifted during the journey. On arrival it was discovered that the sceptre had been broken and needed urgent repair to be used in the coronation.

For his coronation in 1775, Louis XVI in had his goldsmith, Auguste, and his Furbisher, Ravoisier, assess and repair the sword of Charlemagne and its sheath, the spurs, the crown of Charlemagne, the clasp of the coat, the Sceptre, and the Hand of Justice.

In 1790, during the French Revolution, a commission of experts was appointed to create an inventory of the royal treasury before having it transported to the Mint where the items were to be melted, once the precious stones were extracted. The Commission des Monuments had been charged with preserving works whose conservation seemed important for the ‘Les Sciences et les Arts’. The nationalization of treasures during the French Revolution saw the treasures of Sainte-Chapelle and Saint-Denis brought together on November 12, 1793 at the National Convention. The members of the Commission, Masson, Sergent and de Bry, seem to have been aware of the interest of the instruments of the coronation and put history before political passions, preventing the coronation instruments from being melted down. However, part of the shaft of the sceptre was melted down, resulting in a new height of 1.9 feet.

In 1804, Napoleon I, wishing to cement his connection to past rulers, began a project to include in his coronation the ‘Honneurs de Charlemagne’. This was entrusted to Vivant Denon, director of the Museum, assisted by the goldsmith Martin-Guillaume Biennais and the young architect Joseph Gay,at the cost of 1,800 francs-or. During the restoration the crown on the figure was altered and now bears a cross instead of a large pearl. Biennais found only one eagle left on the throne and made three new ones. (One of the eagles is now missing.) Three imitation emeralds replaced the diamonds that were at the centre of the clusters, and three glass stones replaced the real sapphires. The fleur-de-lis was enameled in white in the past, as appears in depictions such as the Madonna of the Vic family by Frans Pourbus the Younger, but Biennais removed the enamel from the lily, most likely due to the poor condition it was in. The scepter's shaft was restored using what was until then a separate precious object, known as the staff of Guillaume de Roquémont, originally created in 1394.

However, the Honneurs de Charlemagne did not play a role in Napoleon’s Coronation; instead, Napoleon used the ‘Honneurs de l’Empereur’ which had been created for the occasion.

== Timeline ==
1365 – Illumination of the Coronation Ordo of Charles V shows a similar Sceptre

1379 – Mentioned in the Inventory of Charles V

The Sceptre served all the coronations of the kings of France since the 14th century at Notre dame du Reims. Returning to the Abbey of Saint- Denis unless specified. (Exceptions: Charles VII and Henry IV.)

1380 – Coronation of Charles VI - Reims

1429 – Coronation of Charles VII –Reims, not used

1461 – Coronation of Louis XI – Reims

1484 – Coronation of Charles VIII – Reims

1498 – Coronation of Louis XII – Reims

1515 – Coronation of Francis I – Reims

1547 – Coronation of Henry II – Reims

1559 – Coronation of Francis II – Reims

1561 – Coronation of Charles IX – Reims

1575 – Coronation of Henry III – Reims

1594 – Coronation of Henry IV – Chartes, not used

1610 – Coronation of Louis XIII – Reims

~ 1617 – Depicted in Virgin of the Vic Family by Frans Pourbus II

1634 – Inventory of the treasury of Saint Denis

~ 1635-40 – Depicted in Louis XIII (1601-1643) by Philippe de Champaigne.

1654 – Coronation of Louis XIV – Reims

1722 – Coronation of Louis XV, Cases made for the regalia, including the sceptre. sceptre arrives at Reims broken and repaired urgently.

~ 1723-24 – Depicted in portrait of Louis XV by Alexis-Simon Belle

1730 – Depicted in portrait of Louis XV in Coronation Robes by Hyacinthe Rigaud

1775 – Coronation of Louis XVI – Reims Louis XVI has goldsmith, Auguste, check and repair the sword of Charlemagne and its sheath, the crown of Charlemagne, the clasp of the coat, the sceptre, and the Hand of Justice.

Reims not used again for a coronation until Charles X

1794 – Many coronation objects have been lost and some remaining are melted down. Noted to survived are the chalice of Saint Remi, gold and darknet spurs, the sword of Charlemagne, and the sceptre of Charlemagne,

1793, Nov 12 – The treasures of Sainte-Chapelle and Sainte-Denis brought together at the National Convention. Reserved to be deposited at the museum included: the spurs “Joyeuse and its sheath, the paten of serpentine, the clasp of the coronation, the Sceptre of Charlemagne.

1804 – Among the “Honours of Charlemagne” at the coronation of Napoleon at Notre-Dame de Paris. Remained there until 1816.

1806 – Depicted in Napoleon I on His Imperial Throne by Jean-Auguste-Dominique Ingres

1816 – Sent to the Garde-Meuble

1825 – Coronation of Charles X – Reims

1829 – Depicted in King Charles X in Coronation Robes by Jean-Auguste-Dominique Ingres

1841 – Depicted in La Sagesse divine donnant des lois aux rois et aux législateurs (Divine Wisdom giving laws to kings and legislators) by Jean-Baptiste Mauzaisse

1848 – Housed at the Ministry of Finance

1853 – Returned to the Louvre, exhibited at the “Musée des souverains”.

1991 – Exhibition in the Louvre “The treasure of Saint-Denis, Napoleon, Temporary Exhibition under the pyramid,

2004 – Exhibition in the Louvre “The arts under Charles VI (1380-1422), Napoleon, Temporary Exhibition under the pyramid,

2007 – Musée d'histoire de France, The king, and his image, around the decorated charters of the national archives, Paris (France), Direction des Archives de France

2017-2018 – Exhibition in the Louvre Small Gallery: Art and power. The theater of power, Richelieu, Temporary Exhibition Rooms,

2020-2021 – Castle - Domaine national de Versailles, Hyacinthe Rigaud (1659-1743) or the Sun portrait, Versailles (External, France), Castle - Domaine national de Versailles

2021-onwards – Louvre Room 504, Richelieu Wing Level 1

== Gallery ==
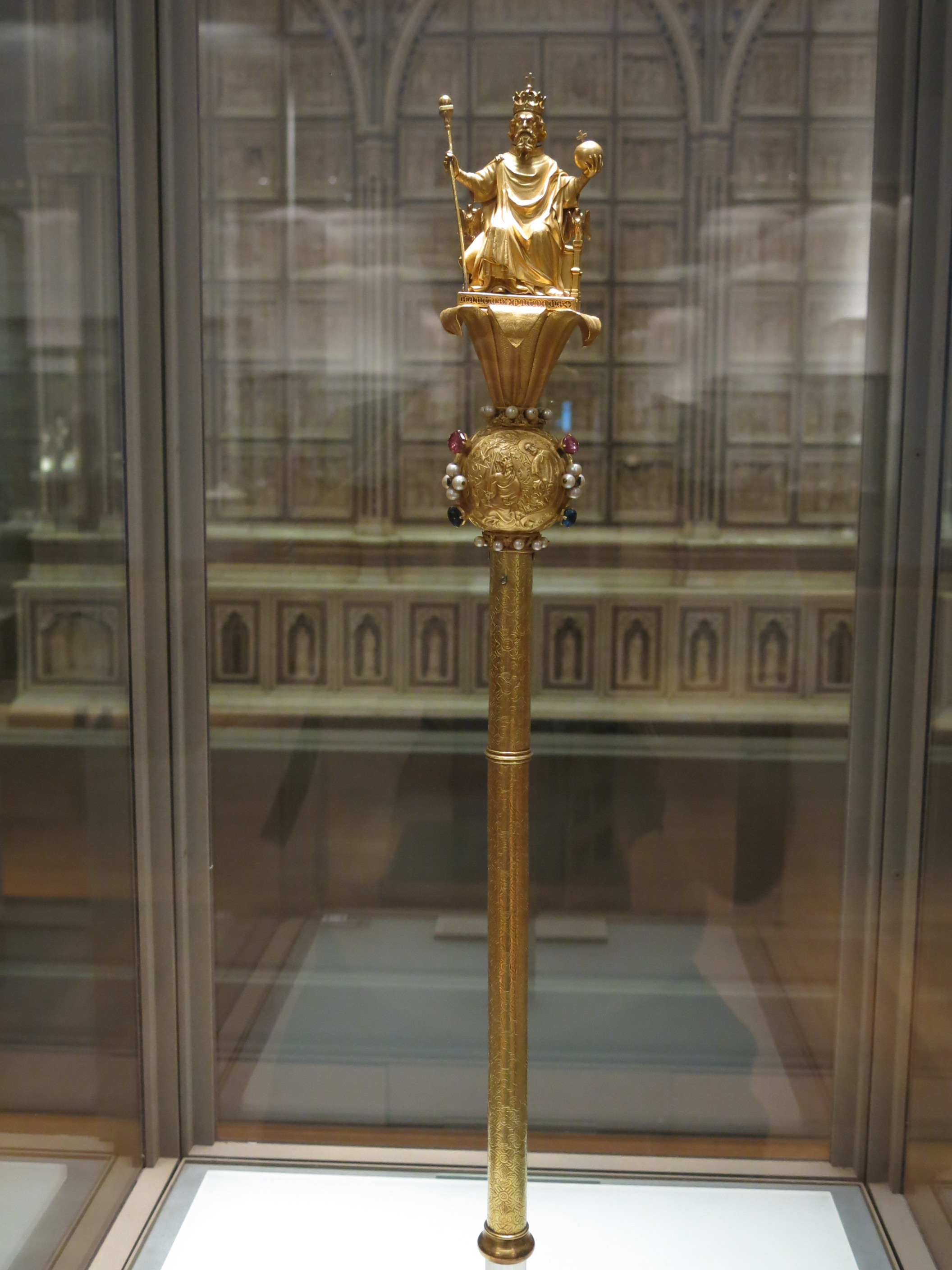
Full-length view

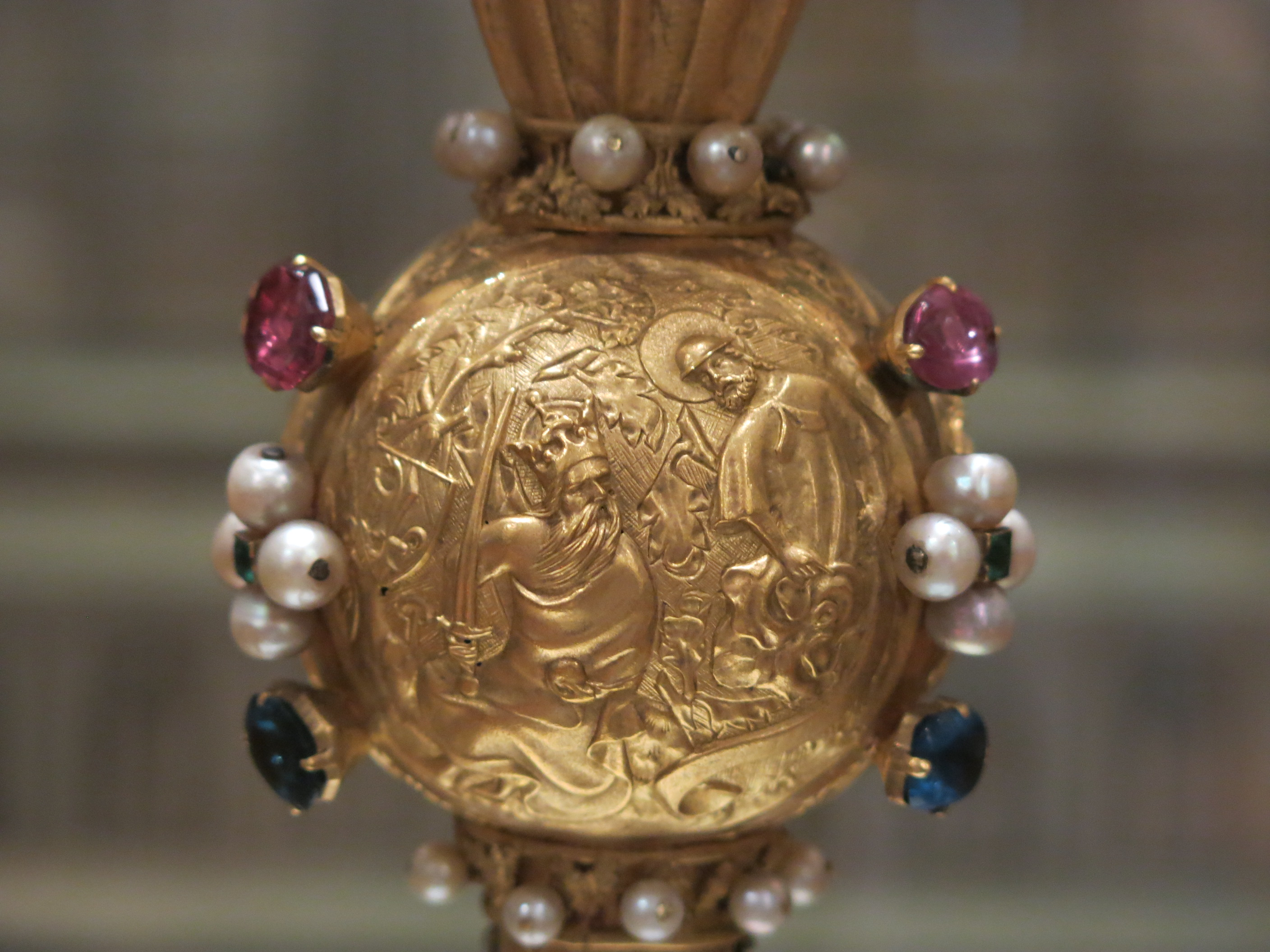
Detail of the bulb: Charlemagne's vision of Saint James

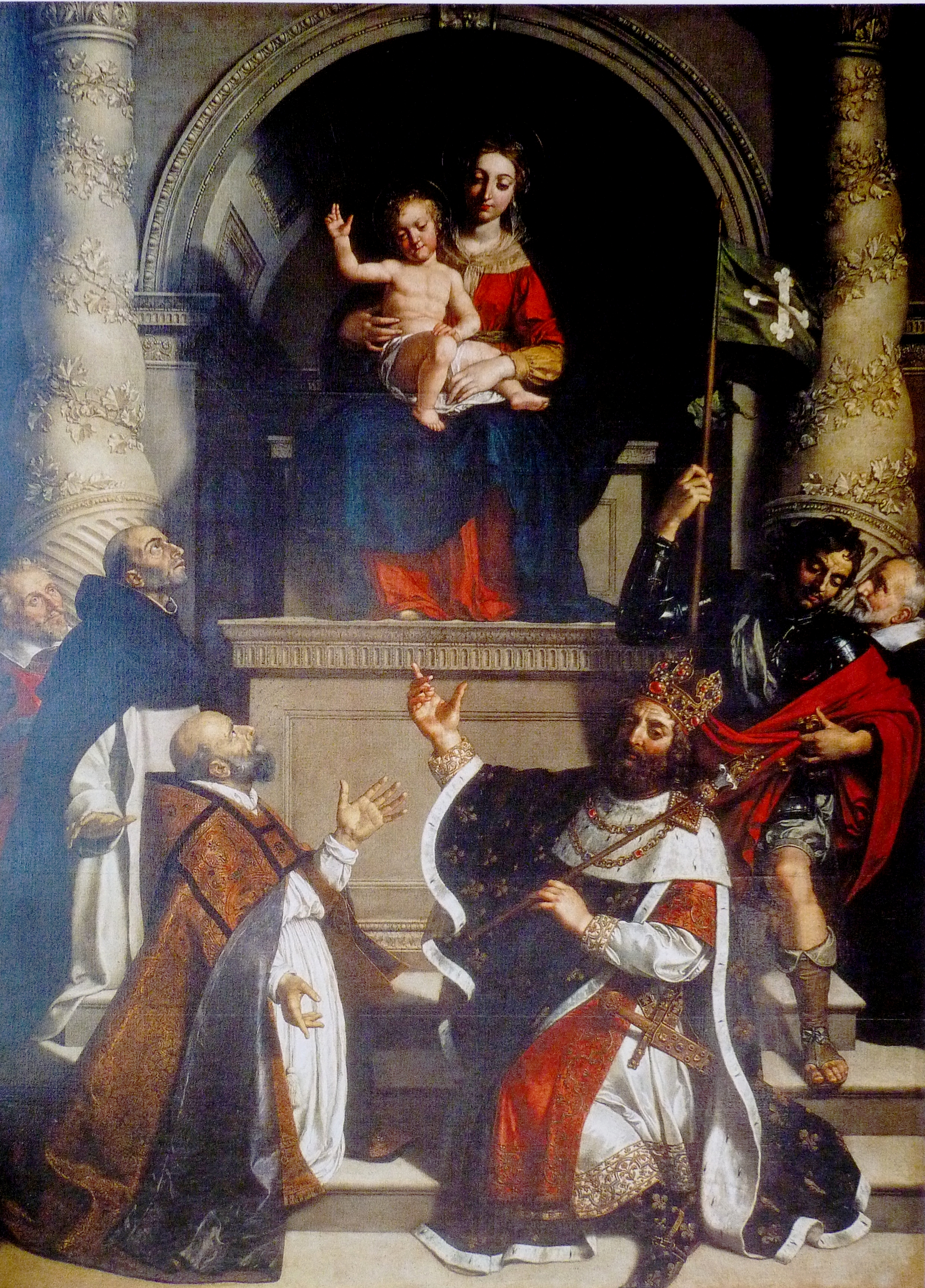
The "Madonna of Vic" depicting Charlemagne holding the scepter of Charles V, by Frans Pourbus the Younger (1617), Saint-Nicolas-des-Champs, Paris

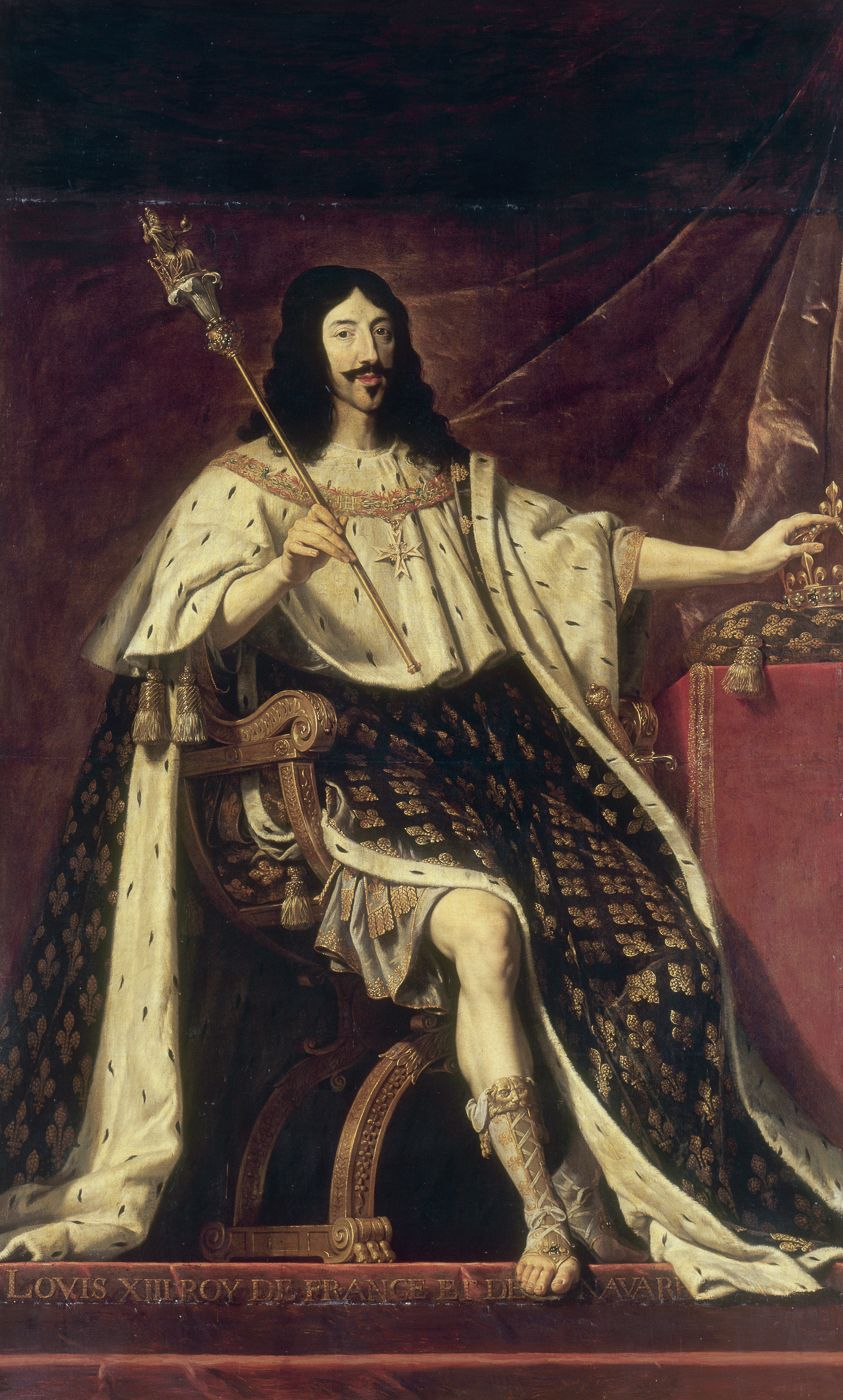
Louis XIII in coronation robes, by Philippe de Champaigne (1630s), Louvre

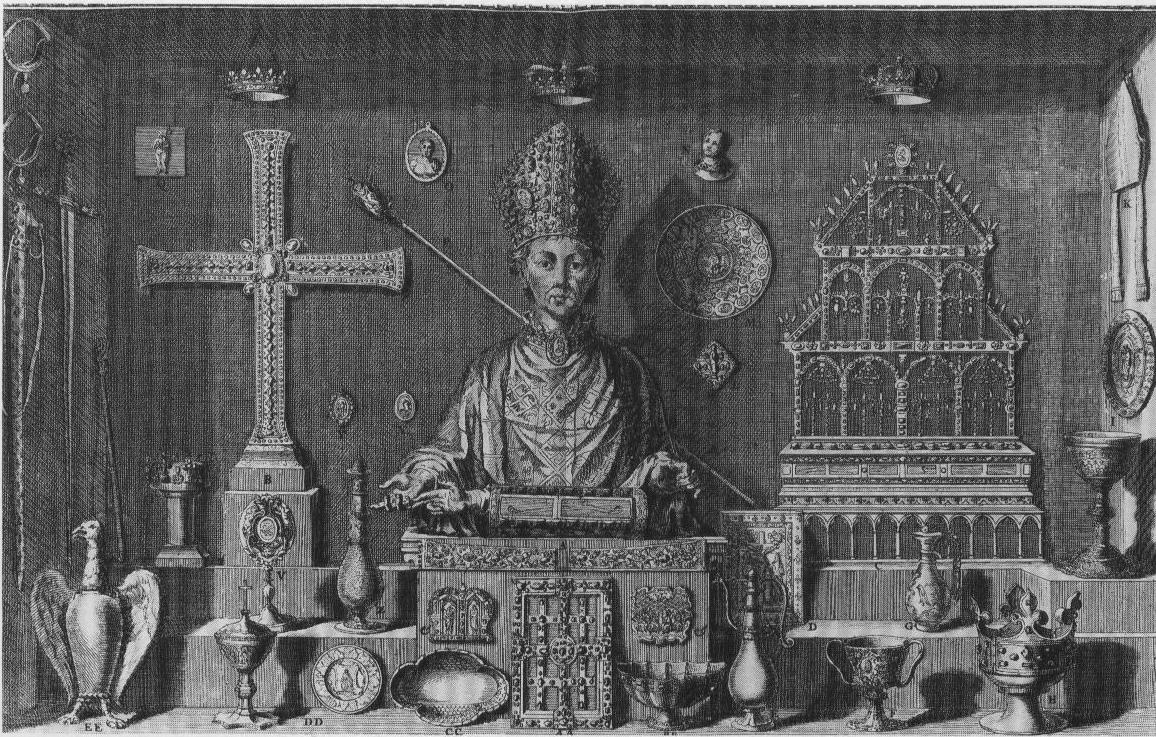
Part of the Saint-Denis Treasury, engraving of by Michel Félibien (1706): the scepter is displayed diagonally, behind the (now lost) reliquary of Saint Benedict at the center

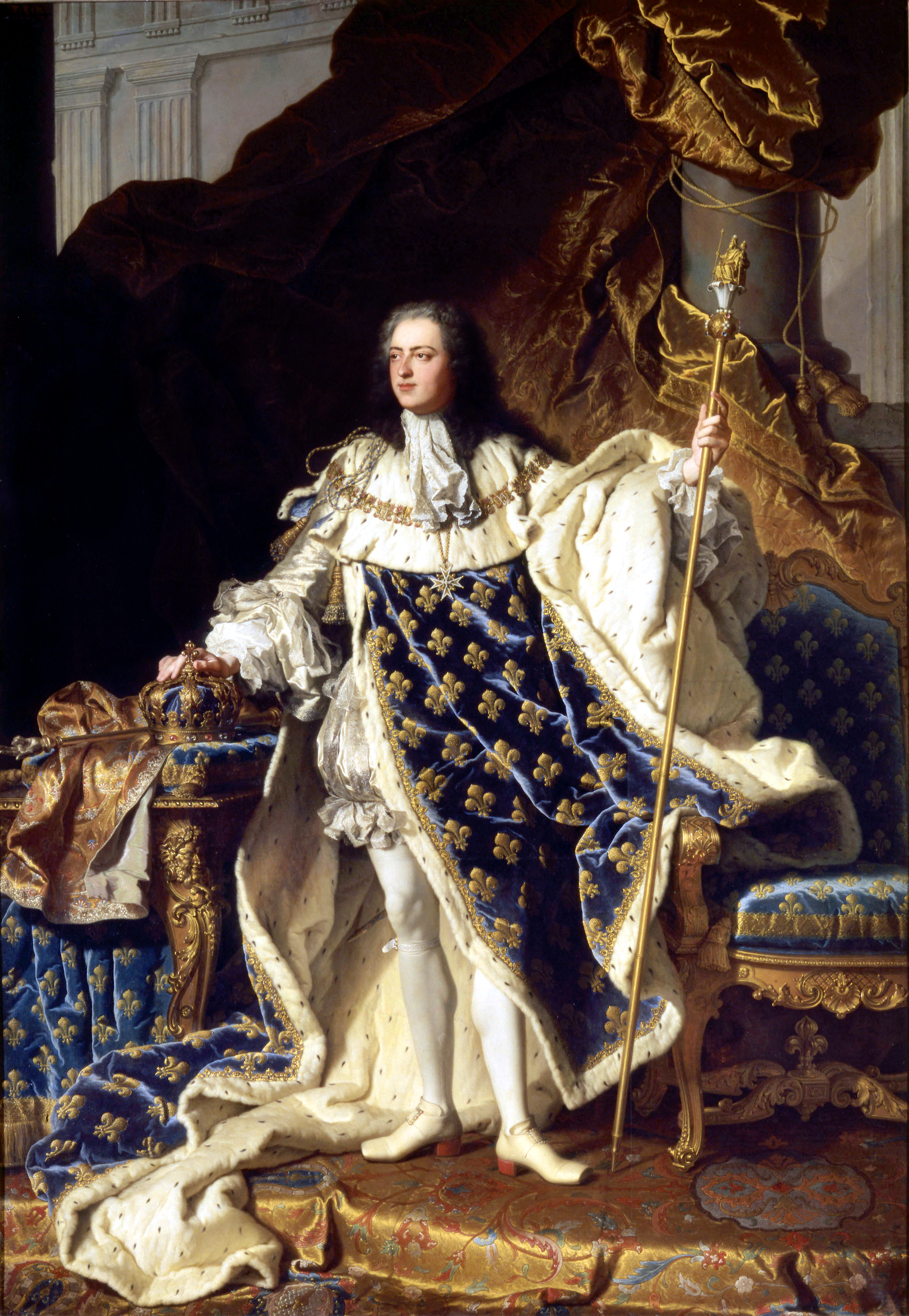
Louis XV in coronation robes, by Hyacinthe Rigaud (1730), Musée de l'Histoire de France (Versailles)

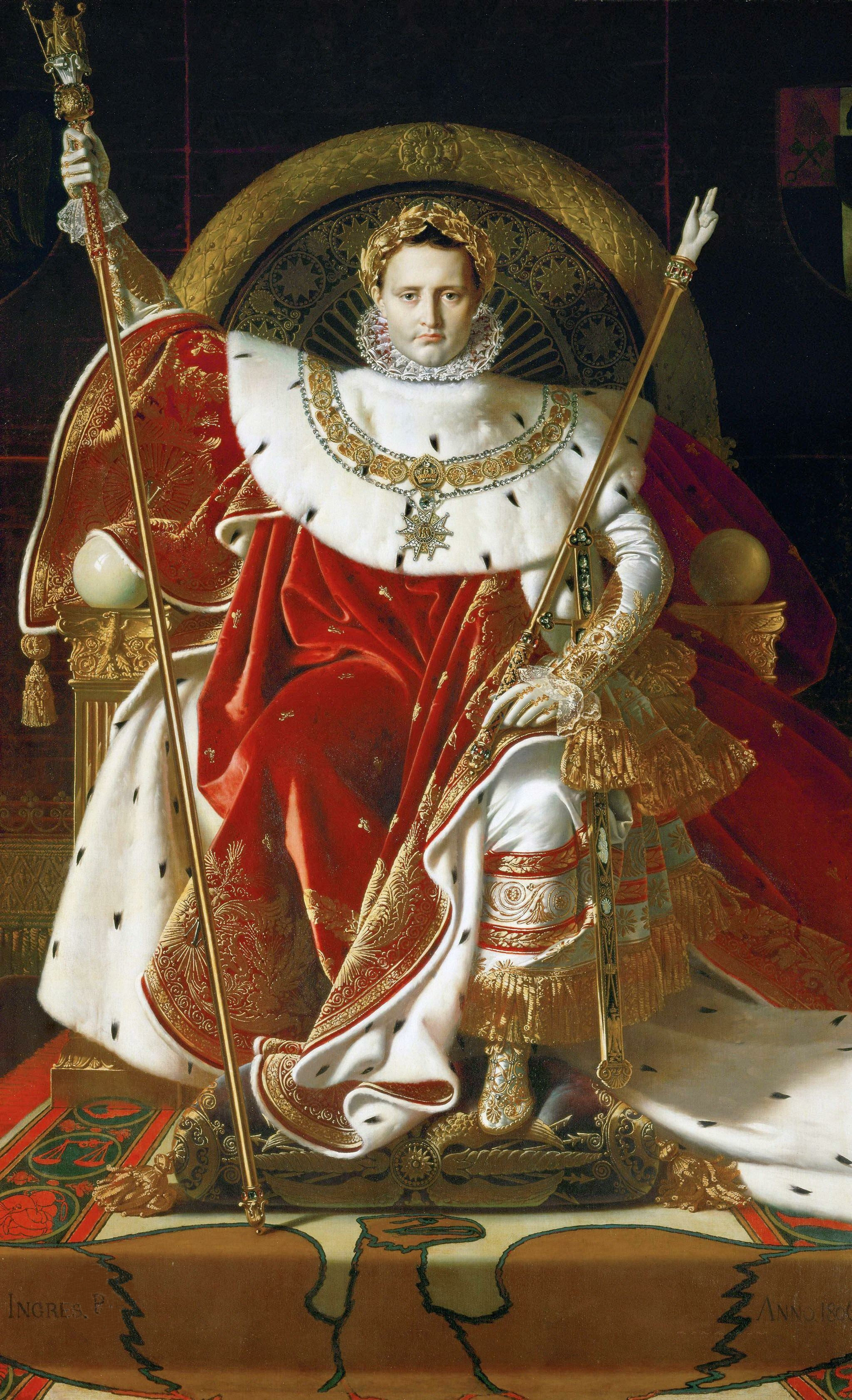
Napoleon I on His Imperial Throne by Jean-Auguste-Dominique Ingres (1806), Army Museum (Paris)

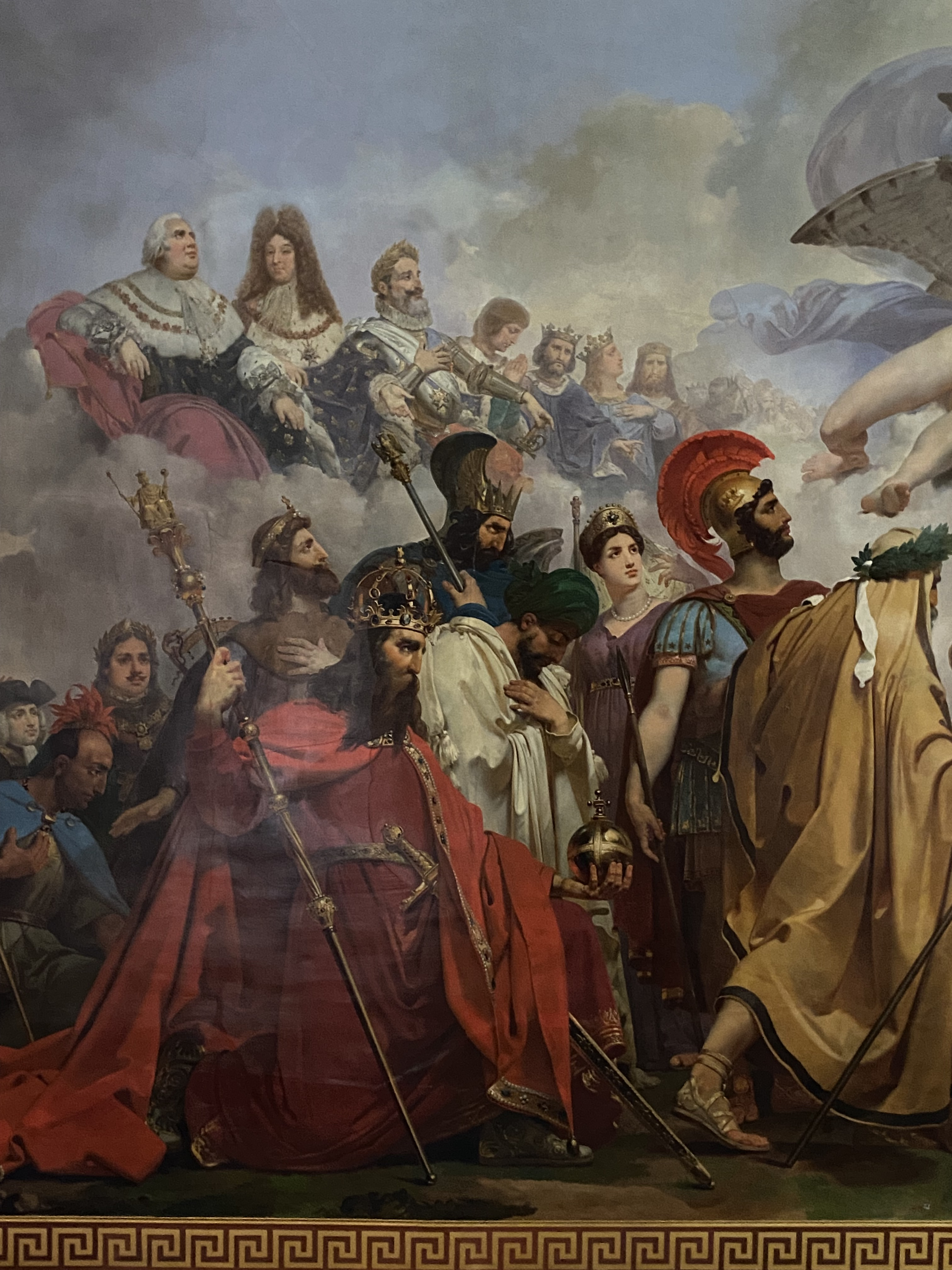
Charlemagne with the scepter among ancient legislators, by Jean-Baptiste Mauzaisse, detail of the ceiling of the Salle des Conférences du Conseil d'Etat (1827), Louvre Palace

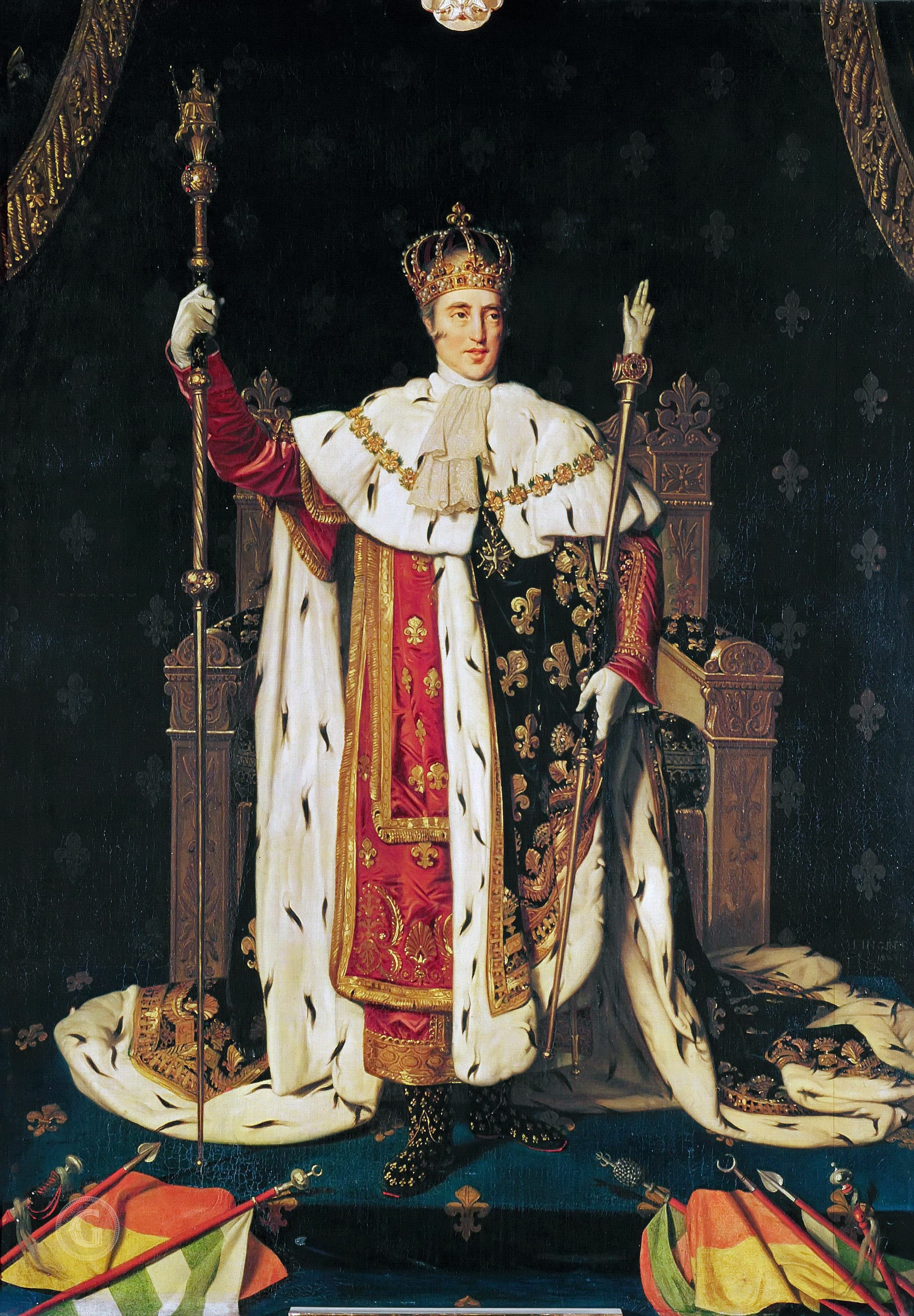
Charles X holding the scepter, by Jean-Auguste-Dominique Ingres (c.1829), Musée Bonnat in Bayonne

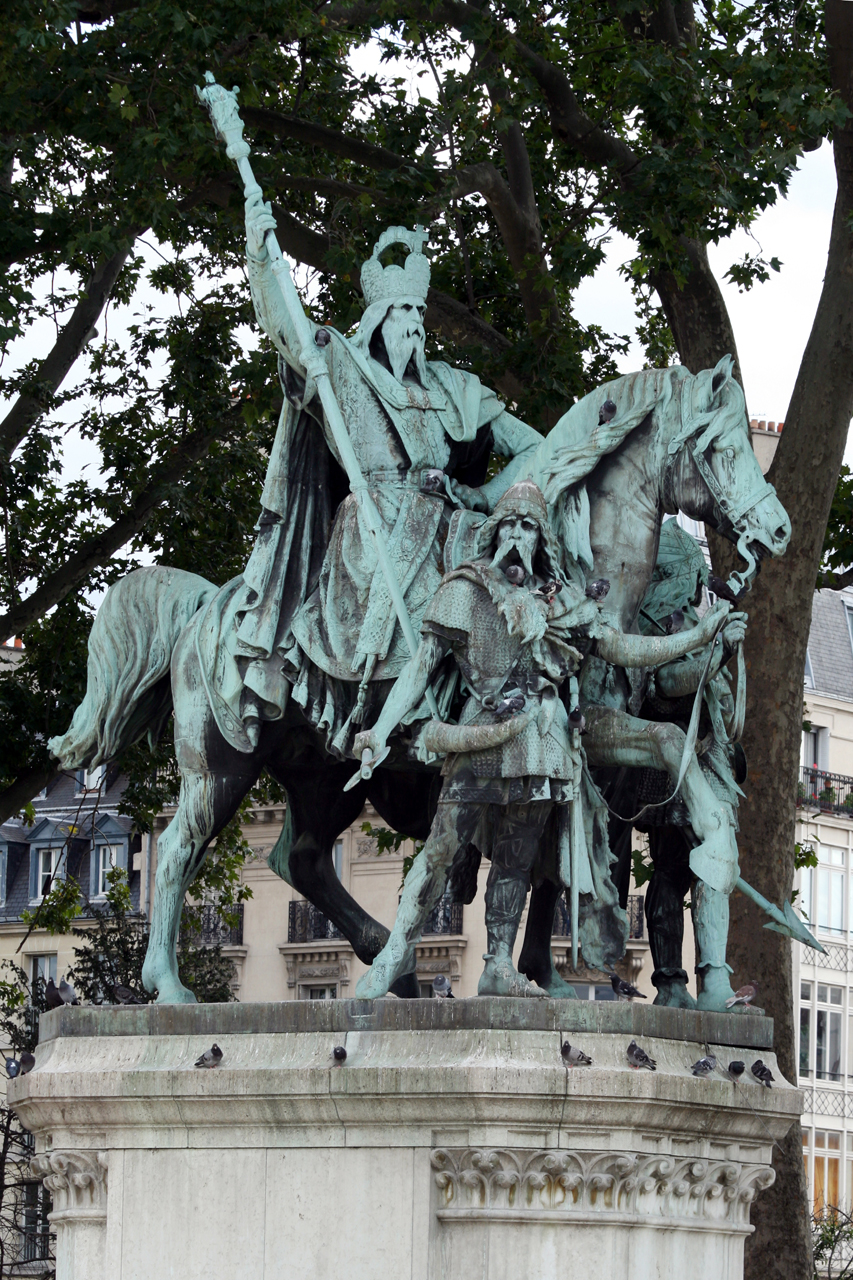
Charlemagne holding the scepter in the bronze group Charlemagne et ses Leudes by the Rochet brothers, Paris, 1878

== See also ==
- Iconography of Charlemagne
- Treasury of Saint-Denis
