= Napoleon I on His Imperial Throne =

Painting by Jean-Auguste-Dominique Ingres

Napoleon I on his Imperial Throne
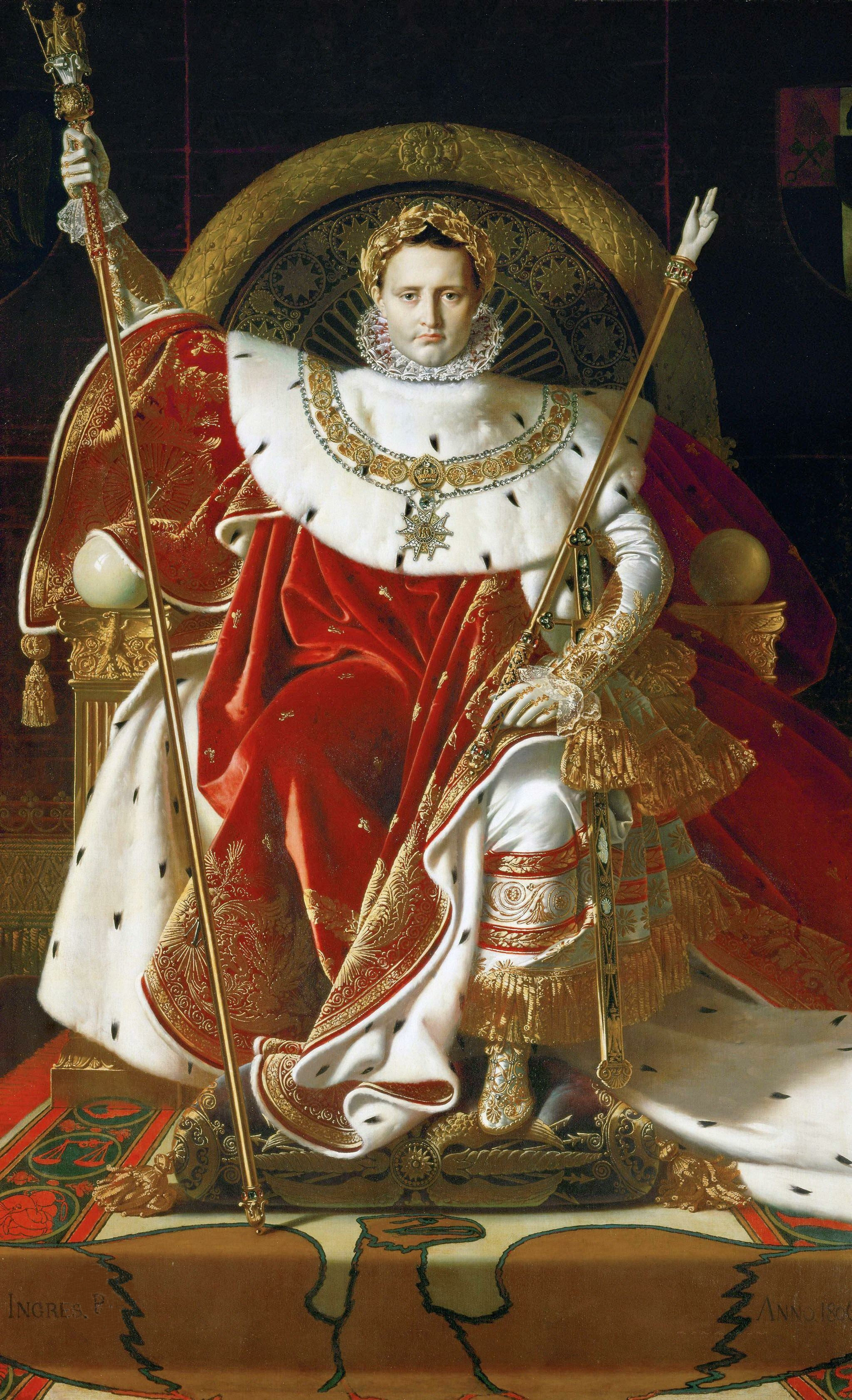
- Artist: Jean-Auguste-Dominique Ingres
- Year: 1806
- Medium: oil on canvas
- Dimensions: 259 cm × 163 cm (102 in × 64 in)
- Location: Musée de l'Armée, Hôtel des Invalides, Paris

Napoleon I on his Imperial Throne (French: Napoléon I^{er} sur le trône impérial) is an 1806 portrait of Napoleon I of France in his coronation costume, painted by the French painter Jean-Auguste-Dominique Ingres.

== Description ==
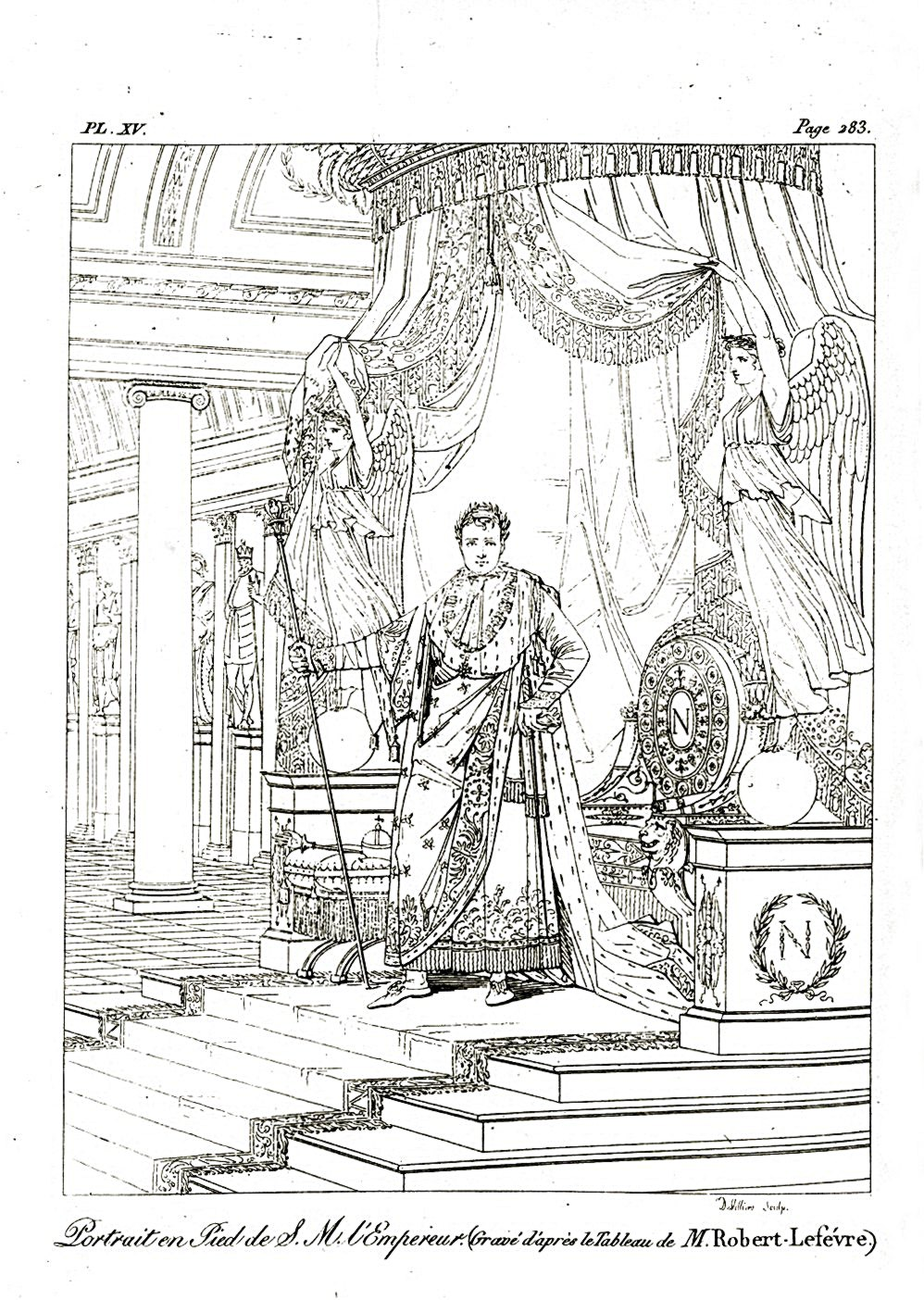
Engraving of Robert Lefèvre's Portrait of Napoleon in his coronation costume, engraving in the treatise by the Pausanias français.

The painting shows Napoleon as emperor, in the costume he wore for his coronation, seated on a circular-backed throne with armrests adorned with ivory balls. In his right hand, he holds the scepter of Charlemagne. In his left hand, that of justice. On his head is a golden laurel wreath, similar to one worn by Julius Caesar. He also wears an ermine hood under the great collar of the Légion d'honneur, a gold-embroidered satin tunic and an ermine-lined purple velvet cloak decorated with gold bees. The coronation sword is in its scabbard and held up by a silk scarf. The subject wears white shoes embroidered in gold and resting on a cushion. The carpet under the throne displays an imperial eagle. The signature INGRES P ^{xit} is in the bottom left, and ANNO 1806 in the bottom right.

== History ==
The painting was exhibited as work number 272 at the Salon of 1806 as His Majesty the Emperor on his throne, when it was recorded as being owned by the Corps législatif. At the same salon Robert Lefèvre exhibited his Portrait of Napoleon in his coronation costume. In 1815 Ingres's painting was transferred to the Louvre Museum, where it was first inventoried as MR 2069 and is now known as INV. 5420. In 1832 the comte de Forbin had it put on display in the Hotel des Invalides, at first in the chapel then from 1860 in the library. It is now on show in the Musée de l'Armée.

At the top right of the painting (and much more visibly on the preparatory drawing), cut off halfway across its width, can be seen a shield with the arms of the Papal States, Este, Milan, Venice and Savoy, all surmounted with the crown of Italy. From this Sébastien Allard hypothesizes that the painting was commissioned by an Italian institution to show Napoleon as king of Italy not as emperor, but, due to its innovative iconography, the original commissioners refused it and that was why it was acquired by the Corps législatif.

== Models and influence ==
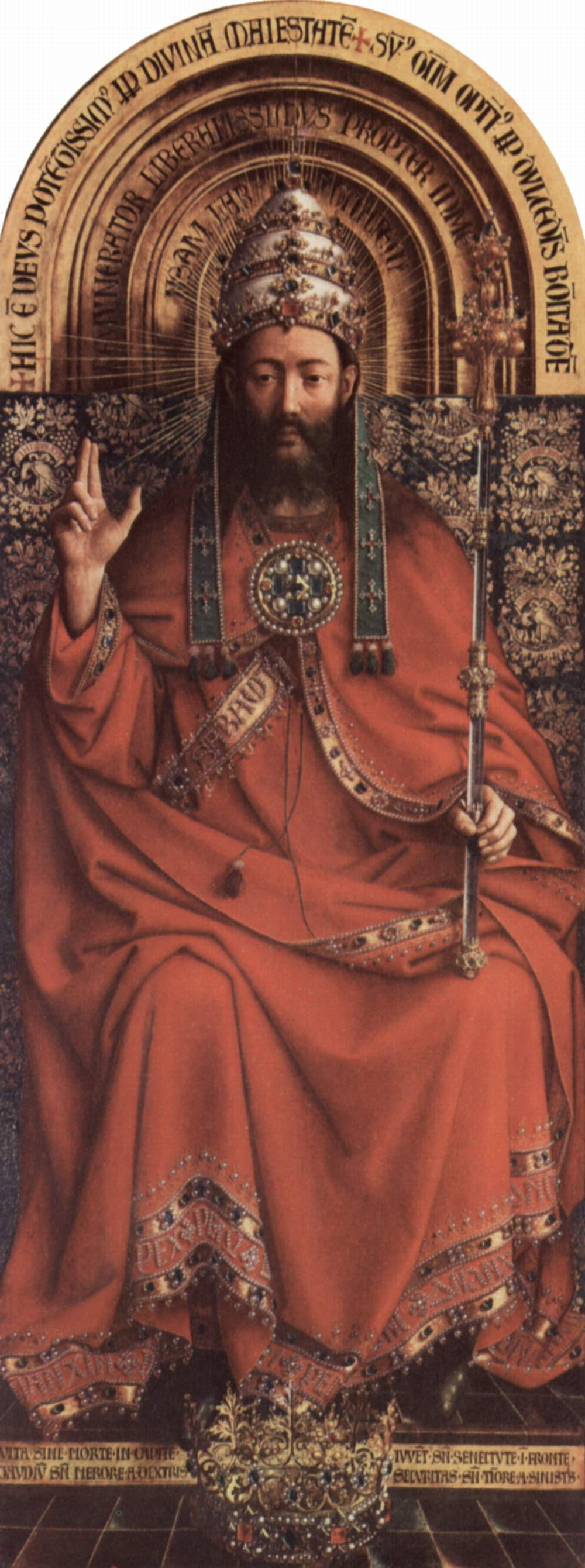
Hubert and Jan van Eyck, God the Father – a panel from their Ghent Altarpiece

=== Zeus ===
This portrait's frontality refers to the colossal Statue of Zeus at Olympia by Phidias, whose pose served as the model not only for many representations of sovereigns but also for Christian iconography. Ingres himself also used this pose for his Jupiter and Thetis. The Musée de Montauban has a chalice with an image after a Byzantine panel showing the seated emperor, which may have been Ingres' direct model.

=== Jan van Eyck ===
For Robert Rosenblum, Ingres's model was the figure of God the Father on the Ghent Altarpiece by Jan van Eyck, which was in the Louvre at the time Ingres painted this portrait. The contemporary critic Pierre-Jean-Baptiste Chaussard compared Ingres's style in this portrait to that of Van Eyck (then known as Jean de Bruges):

His Majesty the Emperor on his Throne - 9 foot by 13 foot – The author has not given an explanation of these paintings. First we consider the Portrait of the Emperor; How, with so much talent, a line so flawless, an attention to detail so thorough, has M. Ingres succeeded in painting a bad picture? The answer is that he wanted to do something singular, something extraordinary. Without doubt, one does not always follow step by step the beaten path, but one must not affect the steeper heights : There are acute minds, who, like goats, are only pleased feeding on the rocky outcrops. The good mind consists of choosing a sure and easy way to go, and it is this route that the great masters, helped by experience, have taken. In leaving it, one risks getting lost – in the same way, via a beautiful passion for the extraordinary in architecture, Borromini and Openor wholly perverted all the arts of drawing; nevertheless the inventors of this depraved taste had the masterpieces of antiquity and of Italy before their eyes : behold how, in another way that is no less detestable than it is Gothic, M Ingres does nothing less than regress the art of four centuries to put us back in our infancy, to resuscitate the manner of Jean de Bruges. But in this infancy of art, there is at least naivety and truth, and this system was the only one that artists knew how to paint by; they could do no better etc.... We heard what was being said in the Salon, and we observed that feelings were unanimous, both among those who knew the arts and among the vulgar. At first, the first viewing warned against the painting, some cry out, some mock its composition and arrangement; but then, when they approach it, they admired its precious finish, and the exact truth of the [depiction of the] fabrics; but one then returns to it again discontented, regretting that the artist had researched the most bizarre effects. Why at first having faced the portrait of the Emperor: it's the most difficult thing to do well... This throne is heavy and massive, the hand which holds the sceptre is not happily executed. It is said that the artist has taken this attitude, as well as in the rest, in the Gothic medallion. As for the emperor's head, it is too heavy, a poor resemblance, of a colour that is false and too : despite the fineness of the brush, the preciousness of the finish, the melting hues, it is dry in manner, makes no effect, and does not leap off the canvas.

However, Ingres himself stated:

I think much of Jean de Bruges, I would wish to resemble him in many ways; but still, he is not my painter and I believe that [the critics] cited him at random.

=== Raphael ===
In the left border of the carpet, among medallions of the zodiac, is a medallion with a version of the Madonna della seggiola by Raphael, the artist Ingres most admired. Ingres pays tribute to Raphael by including this painting in the background of many of his works, such as Henri IV playing with his children and Raphael and La Fornarina and on the table in front of the subject in his Portrait of monsieur Rivière.

== Reception ==
At the Salon, it produced a disturbing impression on the public, due not only to Ingres's stylistic idiosyncrasies but also to his depiction of the Carolingian imagery worn by Napoleon at his coronation. David (who finished his own The Coronation of Napoleon the following year) delivered a severe judgement, and the critics were uniformly hostile, finding fault with the strange discordances of colour, the want of sculptural relief, the chilly precision of contour, and the self-consciously archaic quality. As shown above, Chaussard (Le Pausanias Français, 1806) condemned Ingres's style as gothic (the troubadour style was beginning at this time). As art historian Marjorie Cohn has written: "At the time, art history as a scholarly enquiry was brand new. Artists and critics outdid each other in their attempts to identify, interpret, and exploit what they were just beginning to perceive as historical stylistic developments." The Louvre, newly filled with booty seized by Napoleon in his campaigns in Belgium, the Netherlands, and Italy, provided French artists of the early nineteenth century with an unprecedented opportunity to study, compare, and copy masterworks from antiquity and from the entire history of European painting. From the beginning of his career, Ingres freely borrowed from earlier art, adopting the historical style appropriate to his subject, leading critics to charge him with plundering the past.

== See also ==
- List of paintings by Jean-Auguste-Dominique Ingres

== Bibliography ==
- Porterfield, Todd, and Susan Siegfried. Staging Empire: Napoleon, Ingres, and David (Penn State Press, 2006). online review.
- Robert Rosenblum, Ingres édition Cercle d'Art nouvelle édition augmentée 1986 ISBN 2-7022-0192-X – p. 68, plate 7.
- Emmanuelle Amiot-Saulnier, «Napoléon Ier sur le trône impérial par Jean-Auguste-Dominique Ingres», fiche 435 B, L'Estampille l'objet d'art, n° 435, mai 2008.
