= Vincent Cronin =

British writer, editor and historian (1924-2011)

Vincent Cronin (Cronogue)
- Born: Vincent Archibald Patrick Cronin (Cronogue); 24 May 1924; Tredegar, Monmouthshire, UK
- Died: 25 January 2011 (aged 86); Marbella, Andalusia, Spain
- Occupations: Writer; historian; editor
- Spouse: Chantal de Rolland (m. 1949)
- Children: 5
- Writing career
- Notable awards: Richard Hillary Award; W. H. Heinemann Award (1955); Rockefeller Foundation Award (1958)

Vincent Archibald Patrick Cronin (Cronogue) FRSL (24 May 1924 – 25 January 2011) was a British historical, cultural, and biographical writer, best known for his biographies of Louis XIV, Louis XVI and Marie Antoinette, Catherine the Great and Napoleon, as well as for his books on the Renaissance.

Cronin was born in Tredegar, Monmouthshire, to Scottish physician and novelist A. J. Cronin, and May Gibson, but moved to London at the age of two. He was educated at Ampleforth College, Harvard University, the Sorbonne, and Trinity College, Oxford, from which he graduated with honours in 1947, earning a degree in Literae Humaniores. During the Second World War, he served as a lieutenant in the British Army.

== Family ==
In 1949, he married Chantal de Rolland, and they had five children. The Cronins were long-time residents of London, Marbella, and Dragey, in Avranches, Normandy, where they lived at the Manoir de Brion. He died at his home in Marbella on 25 January 2011.

== Awards ==
Cronin was a recipient of the Richard Hillary Award, the W. H. Heinemann Award (1955), and the Rockefeller Foundation Award (1958). He also contributed to the Revue des Deux Mondes, was the first general editor of the Companion Guides series, and was on the council of the Royal Society of Literature.

His publications sold well, but were not always received well by scholars. Reviewer John T. Alexander called Catherine, Empress of All the Russias, a "facile popularization".

== Works ==
- The Golden Honeycomb: A Sicilian Quest (1954) ISBN 0-246-11125-9
- The Wise Man from the West: Matteo Ricci and his Mission to China (1955) ISBN 0-00-626749-1
- The Last Migration (1957) (on the Falqani tribe of South Persia) ISBN 0-85617-608-7
- "T. S. Eliot as a Translator." T. S. Eliot: A Symposium for His Seventieth Birthday. Ed. Neville Braybrooke, 129–137 (1958) ISBN 0-900391-82-0
- A Pearl to India: The Life of Roberto de Nobili (1959) ISBN 0-246-63709-9
- The Letter After Z (1960) (novel)
- Translator, L'Amour Profane by Alfred Kern (1961) (novel)
- A Calendar of Saints (1963)
- The Companion Guide to Paris (1963 - first edition) ISBN 0-00-613765-2
- Louis XIV (1964) ISBN 0-00-272072-8
- Translator, The Christian Centuries: A New History of the Catholic Church, Volume One: The First Six Hundred Years by Jean Danielou and Henri Marrou (1964) ISBN 0-232-35604-1
- Four Women in Pursuit of an Ideal (1965) (about Caroline, duchesse de Berry, Marie D'Agoult, Eve Hanska and Marie Bashkirtseff; also published as The Romantic Way, 1966)
- Editor, The Sunday Times Travel and Holiday Guide (1966) (edited with Elizabeth Nicholas and Leonard Russell)
- The Florentine Renaissance (1967) ISBN 0-00-211262-0
- Mary Portrayed (1968) ISBN 0-87505-213-4
- "The Classical Ideal in Florence." Essays by Divers Hands, Volume XXXV: 23–39 (1969)
- Editor, The Companion Guide to the West Highlands of Scotland by W.H. Murray (1969) ISBN 0-13-154774-7
- The Flowering of the Renaissance (1969) ISBN 0-7126-9884-1
- Editor, The Companion Guide to the North Island of New Zealand by Errol Brathwaite (1970) ISBN 0-00-211139-X
- Napoleon (1971), ISBN 0-00-637521-9 (also published as Napoleon Bonaparte: An Intimate Biography, 1972, ISBN 0-688-00100-9)
- The Horizon Concise History of Italy (1972) ISBN 0-07-014477-X (also published as A Concise History of Italy, 1973, ISBN 0-304-29236-2)
- Louis and Antoinette (1974) ISBN 0-8095-9216-9
- Translator, Towards a New Democracy by Valéry Giscard d'Estaing (1977) ISBN 0-00-216156-7
- Catherine, Empress of All the Russias (1978) ISBN 0-00-216119-2
- Editor, Essays by Divers Hands, Volume XL (1979) ISBN 0-85115-119-1
- Editor, The Companion Guide to Florence by Eve Borsook (1979) ISBN 0-00-216245-8
- The View from Planet Earth: Man Looks at the Cosmos (1981) ISBN 0-688-01479-8
- Paris on the Eve, 1900-1914 (1989) ISBN 0-312-04876-9
- The Renaissance (1992) ISBN 0-00-215411-0
- Paris: City of Light, 1919-1939 (1994) ISBN 0-00-215191-X
- Chile Rediscovered (2009) ISBN 1-906768-02-1
- Nero (2010) ISBN 1-906768-14-5
