= Napoleon Bonaparte: An Intimate Biography =

1972 biography of Napoleon Bonaparte by Vincent Cronin

- First edition
- Author: Vincent Cronin
- Cover artist: Andrea Appiani
- Language: English
- Genre: non-fiction Biography
- Publisher: William Collins
- Publication date: 1971
- Publication place: United Kingdom
- Media type: Print (hardcover)
- Pages: 480
- ISBN: 0-00-637521-9; 0-688-00100-9

Napoleon (1971) also published as Napoleon Bonaparte: An Intimate Biography in 1972 is a biography of French Emperor Napoleon Bonaparte written by Vincent Cronin. The biographical style tends more towards a sympathetic overview of Napoleon's life and focuses more on the man's personality and relationships rather than his wars and battles, although these still play a significant part of the book.

== Writing background ==
Vincent Cronin states in the preface of the book his reasons for writing another biography over the many that had already been written. His first reason was that since 1951 new material had been discovered that was yet to be published that shed light on a new side of Napoleon, such as love letters to Désirée Clary and Napoleon's autobiography entitled Clisson et Eugénie.

Cronin states that:

"The second reason is more personal. There are in existence a large number of Lives of Napoleon and, though it will sound presumptuous, I was dissatisfied with their picture of Napoleon. I could not find a living, breathing man. Always to my mind there were glaring contradictions of character. To take one example from many, biographers repeat Napoleon's phrase: "Friendship is only a word. I love no man." But at the same time it was obvious from their own pages that Napoleon had many close friends, more I reckon than any ruler of France, and that he was as fond of them as they were of him. Many of the biographers were evidently embarrassed by this seeming contradiction, and they tried to explain it by saying that Napoleon was different from other men: "Napoleon was a monster of egoism," or "Napoleon was a monster of insincerity." I for one do not believe in monsters." – Vincent Cronin, Preface of Napoleon

== Reception ==
The book has created much controversy due to the depiction of Napoleon as a generally respectable person, as a result the novel has received mixed reviews as a biography.

Susan Howard of napoleon-series.org criticised the layout and the biases of the book, noting that "Over controversial matters Napoleon is given the benefit of the doubt every time, his motives are always presented as benign, although a few character defects, such as impatience, dislike of criticism and in later life, over-optimism, are admitted. For instance, Napoleon's use of censorship and press control was "a mark of weakness… Napoleon would be more attractive if he had been able to rise above that weakness." And again: "Napoleon's guiding purpose in the Empire was to export liberty, equality, justice and sovereignty of the people," is qualified a little later by "It is true there were blots on the imperial picture. Too often Napoleon acted brusquely, while Jerome overspent…"

== References in other works ==
In Bill Clinton's 2004 autobiography, My Life, he writes, "I still remember sitting in front of the fire on a cold winter day as Hillary and I read Vincent Cronin's biography of Napoleon together."
