= Iconography of Charlemagne =

Depictions of Frankish king

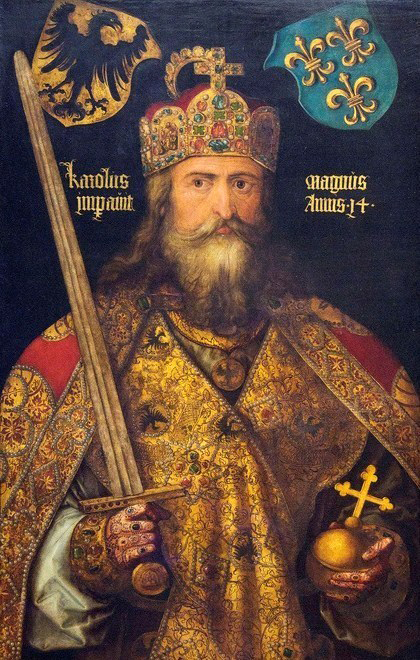
Charlemagne by Albrecht Dürer, early 1510s, Germanisches Nationalmuseum

The iconography of Charlemagne is a reflection of Charlemagne's position in Europe's collective memory, as a Frankish king, founder of the Holy Roman Empire, unifier of Western Europe, protector of the Catholic Church, promoter of education and of the Carolingian Renaissance, fictional precursor of the crusades, one of the Nine Worthies, a (contested) Catholic saint, and a national icon in Andorra, Belgium, France, Germany, Italy, the Netherlands and Switzerland.

== Appearance ==
The Vita Karoli Magni written after Charlemagne's death by his servant Einhard has served ever since as a reference establishing his stature and charisma:

Charles was large and strong, and of lofty stature, though not disproportionately tall (his height is well known to have been seven times the length of his foot); the upper part of his head was round, his eyes very large and animated, nose a little long, hair fair, and face laughing and merry. Thus his appearance was always stately and dignified, whether he was standing or sitting; although his neck was thick and somewhat short, and his belly rather prominent; but the symmetry of the rest of his body concealed these defects. His gait was firm, his whole carriage manly, and his voice clear, but not so strong as his size led one to expect.

— Einhard, The Life of Charlemagne, translated by Samuel Epes Turner (New York: Harper & Brothers, 1880)

=== Beard ===
Contemporaneous depictions of Charlemagne and related rulers suggest he sported a mustache, but not a beard. The motif of Charlemagne's beard appears in 11th-century chansons de geste and especially the Song of Roland, which has a verse describing Charlemagne: "Blanche ad la barbe et tut flurit le chef", which translates as "his beard is white, and all his hair is greying." The expression "l'empereur à la barbe fleurie" came to refer specifically to Charlemagne in French, and was further popularized by Victor Hugo in a 1846 poem of la Légende des siècles:

Charlemagne, empereur à la barbe fleurie,
Revient d'Espagne; il a le cœur triste, il s'écrie :
« Roncevaux ! Roncevaux ! ô traître Ganelon ! »
Car son neveu Roland est mort dans ce vallon
Avec les douze pairs et toute son armée.

— Victor Hugo, "Aymerillot"

The epithet "fleuri" in this context appears to have meant "greyish-white", alluding to Charlemagne's old age - even though he was actually under 40 at the time of the historical battle of Roncevaux Pass. An alternative view is that the poem refers to Charlemagne's beard being kept unshaven during the arduous military campaign.

In any case, the beard has remained a near-constant attribute of Charlemagne since the High Middle Ages, and a long white beard associated with his old age. A rare exception is his depiction in the fresco of the Coronation of Charlemagne in the Raphael Rooms of the Apostolic Palace, since this was made a likeness of Francis I of France for political reasons, and Francis was beardless at the time. Some 20th- or 21st-century depictions of Charlemagne also show him beardless for historical accuracy.

=== Attire ===
Charlemagne has been generally depicted in military or ceremonial garb, with the style varying across time - typically, contemporary or at least recent in the Middle Ages and early modern period; ancient Roman in the 18th century; and aiming at historicist accuracy in the 19th century. He is often shown carrying, in his left hand, a globus cruciger, and in his right hand, either a sword (sometimes modeled on his attributed Joyeuse) or a scepter; from the 17th century the latter has tended, at least in France, to be the scepter of Charles V then known as "scepter of Charlemagne". In images where Charlemagne is crowned, the crown is in some instances the Imperial Crown of the Holy Roman Empire, as in Albrecht Dürer's seminal portrait now in Nuremberg, or the coronation crown of the kings of France also known as Crown of Charlemagne, as in the Mass of Saint Giles now in London. In many other depictions, however, the crown does not refer to a specific existing object.

== Heraldry ==
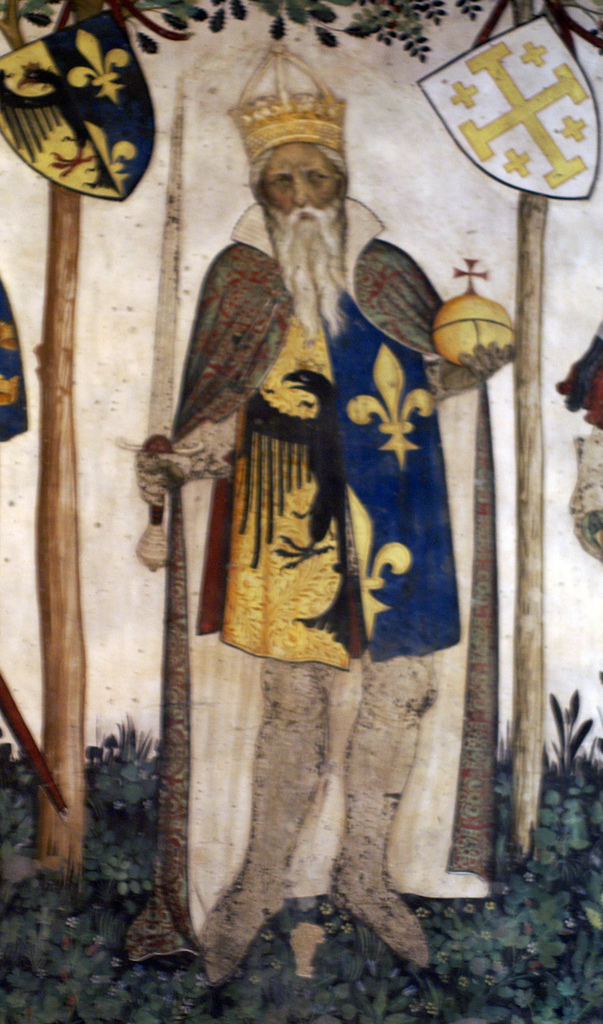
Charlemagne coated in his attributed arms (also displayed in upper left corner), Castello della Manta, 1420s

In the Holy Roman Empire, the Imperial eagle (Reichsadler) emblem was attributed retroactively to Charlemagne, at the latest at the time of his reburial under Emperor Frederick II in 1215. Meanwhile, following the marriage of Isabella of Hainault with Philip II of France in 1180, the French Capetian dynasty promoted its own claims to the memory and legacy of Charlemagne, including by linking him to the fleur-de-lis.

The heraldic combination of the two shields, by either dimidiation (i.e. with only a half-Reichsadler on the "German" side) or more rarely impalement (full Reichsadler), is first attested in a poem of Ogier's Youth (Les Enfances Ogier) by Adenes Le Roi in the last third of the 13th century. This adaptation became accepted in France and in the Empire as well, thanks to the fleur-de-lis's symbolic and mythical association not only with the Capetians but also with their Frankish predecessors.

In line with the prevailing conventions of precedence among European monarchies, French depictions generally placed the Imperial eagle on the more honorable left-hand half of the shield (worn on the right-hand side when displayed on Charlemagne's coat), as was naturally done in the Empire.

== Public monuments ==
Charlemagne was represented from medieval times in public settings including churches and civic landmarks. These include, among numerous others, the stucco statue of Charlemagne inside Saint John Abbey, Müstair (Switzerland), of uncertain date between the 9th and 12th centuries; a statue above the entrance of Osnabrück Town Hall; and a prominent 15th-century statue on one of the towers of the Grossmünster in Zürich (the original is now in the crypt, and a copy by Otto Münch was replaced on the tower in 1933).

From the early modern era, several free-standing statues of Charlemagne were created for prominent public locations for various political purposes, including:

- The statue of Charlemagne in Aachen (Peter and Frans von Trier, 1620); the original is now in the Centre Charlemagne museum, and a 1969 copy replaced on the Marktplatz in front of Aachen Town Hall
- The equestrian statue of Charlemagne under the portico of St. Peter's Basilica (Agostino Cornacchini, 1725)
- The statue of Charlemagne on the Alte Brücke in Frankfurt (Johann Nepomuk Zwerger, 1843); the original is now at the Historical Museum, and a copy was re-erected on the bridge in 2016
- The statue of Charlemagne in Liège (Louis Jehotte, 1867)
- The bronze group of Charlemagne et ses Leudes in front of Notre-Dame de Paris (Louis and Charles Rochet, 1878)
- The equestrian statue of Charlemagne on Keizer Karelplein in Nijmegen (Albert Termote, 1960)

== Gallery ==
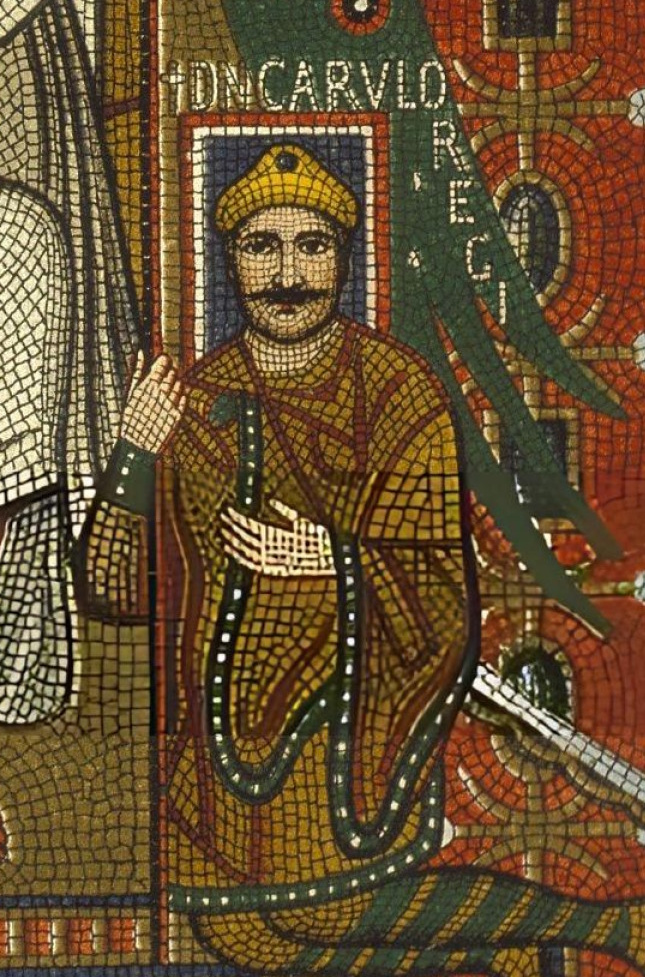
Mosaic at Triclinium Leoninum c. 798 - 799 (Heavely restored in 1743)

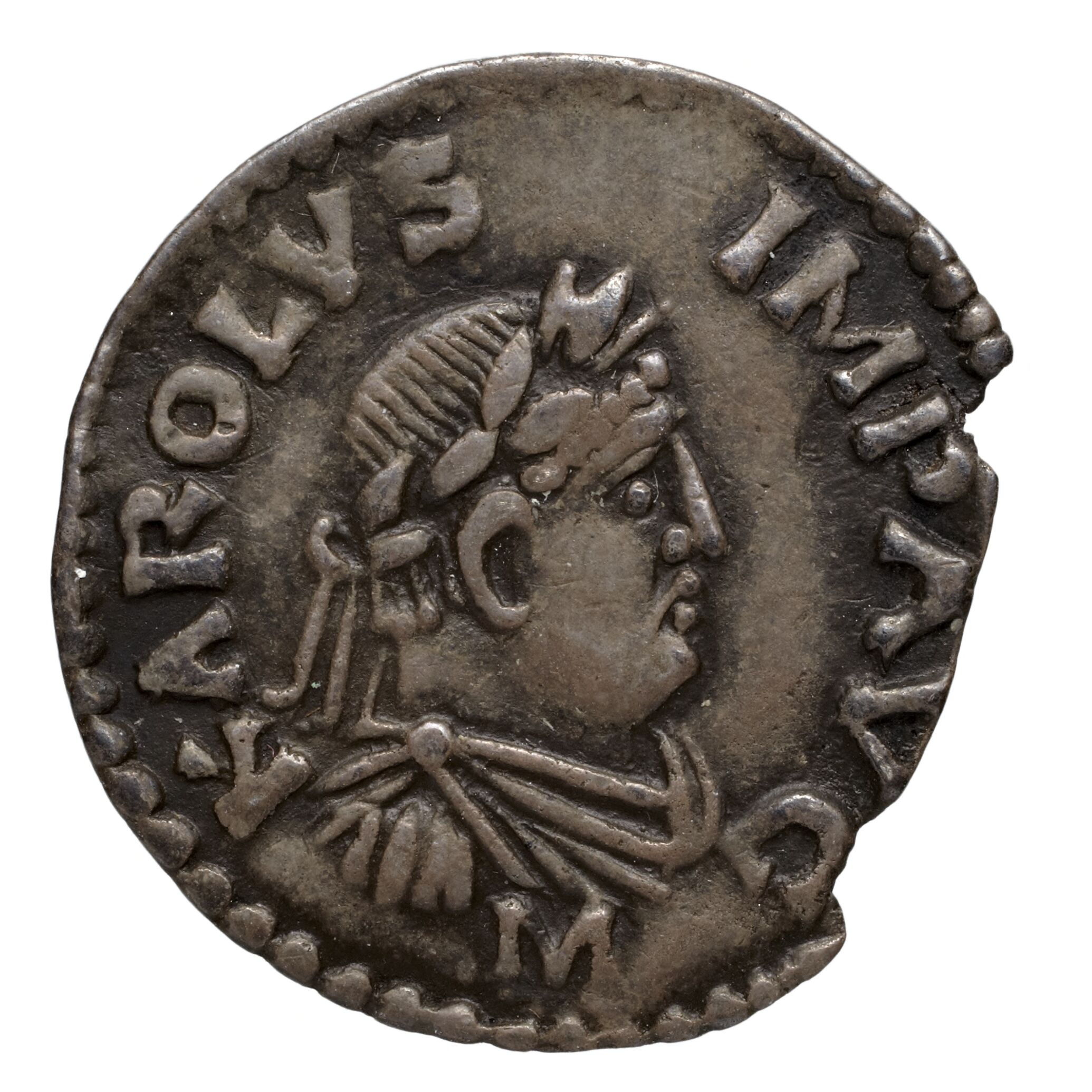
Denier of Charlemagne, early 810s

so-called Equestrian statuette of Charlemagne, 9th century, Louvre

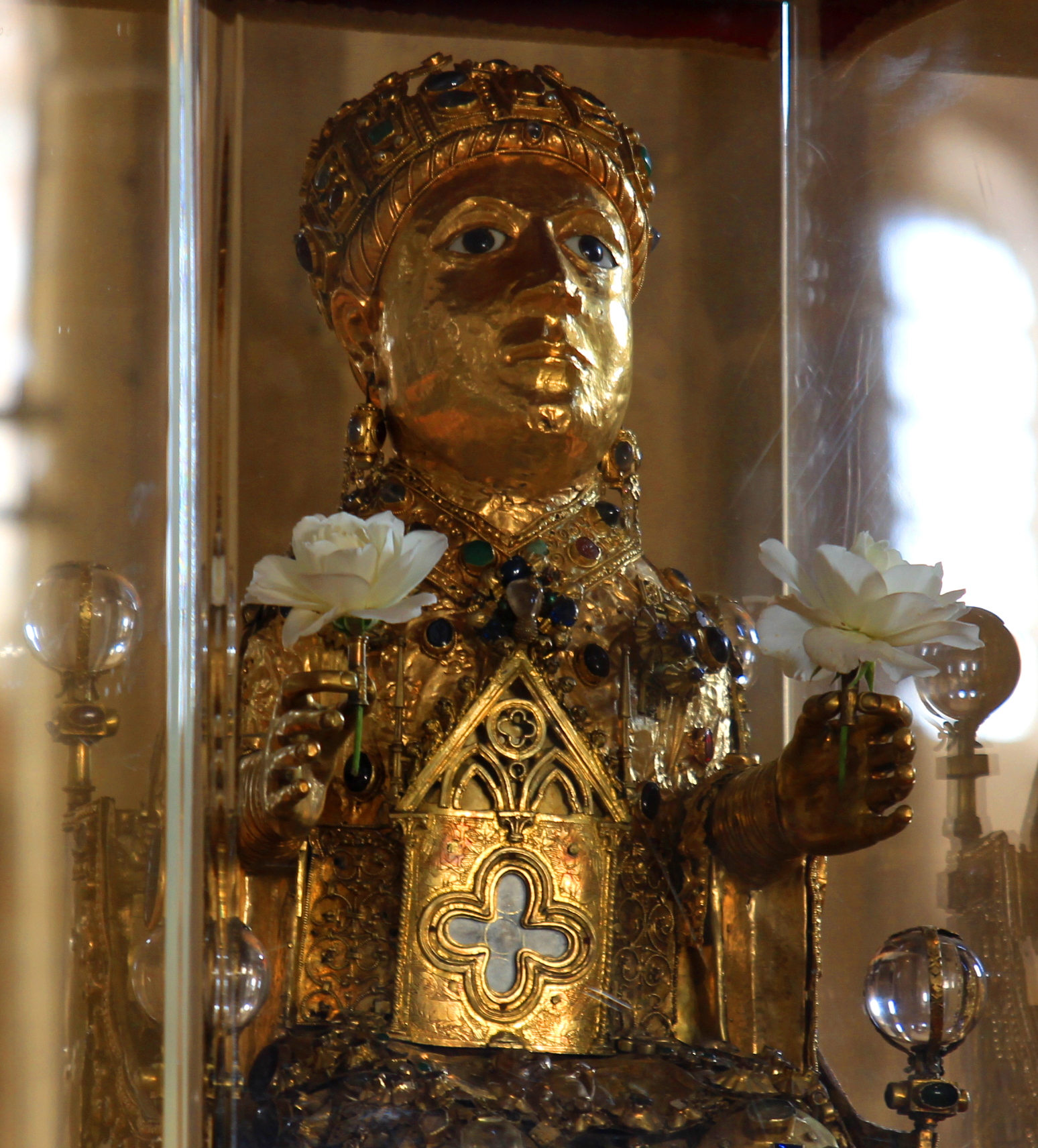
Thomas Hoving has theorized that the life-size golden face of the reliquary of Saint Faith at Conques, France, is a portrait or death mask of Charlemagne.

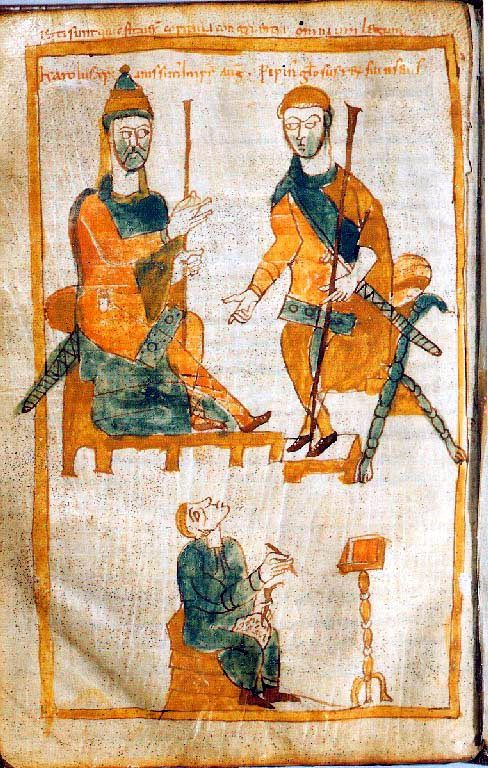
Charlemagne and Pepin of Italy, 10th century

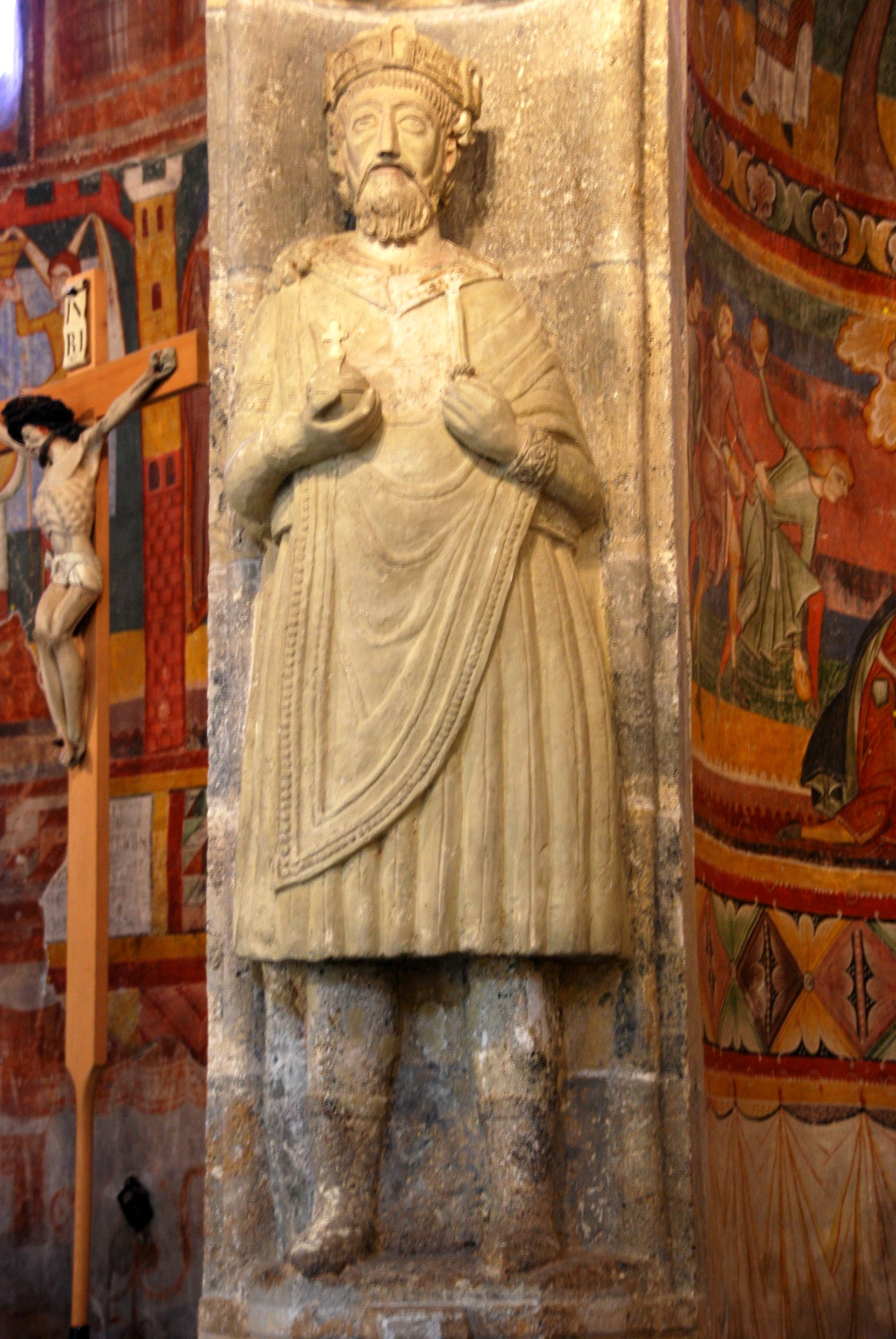
Stucco sculpture of Charlemagne, Saint John Abbey, Müstair, 10th–12th century

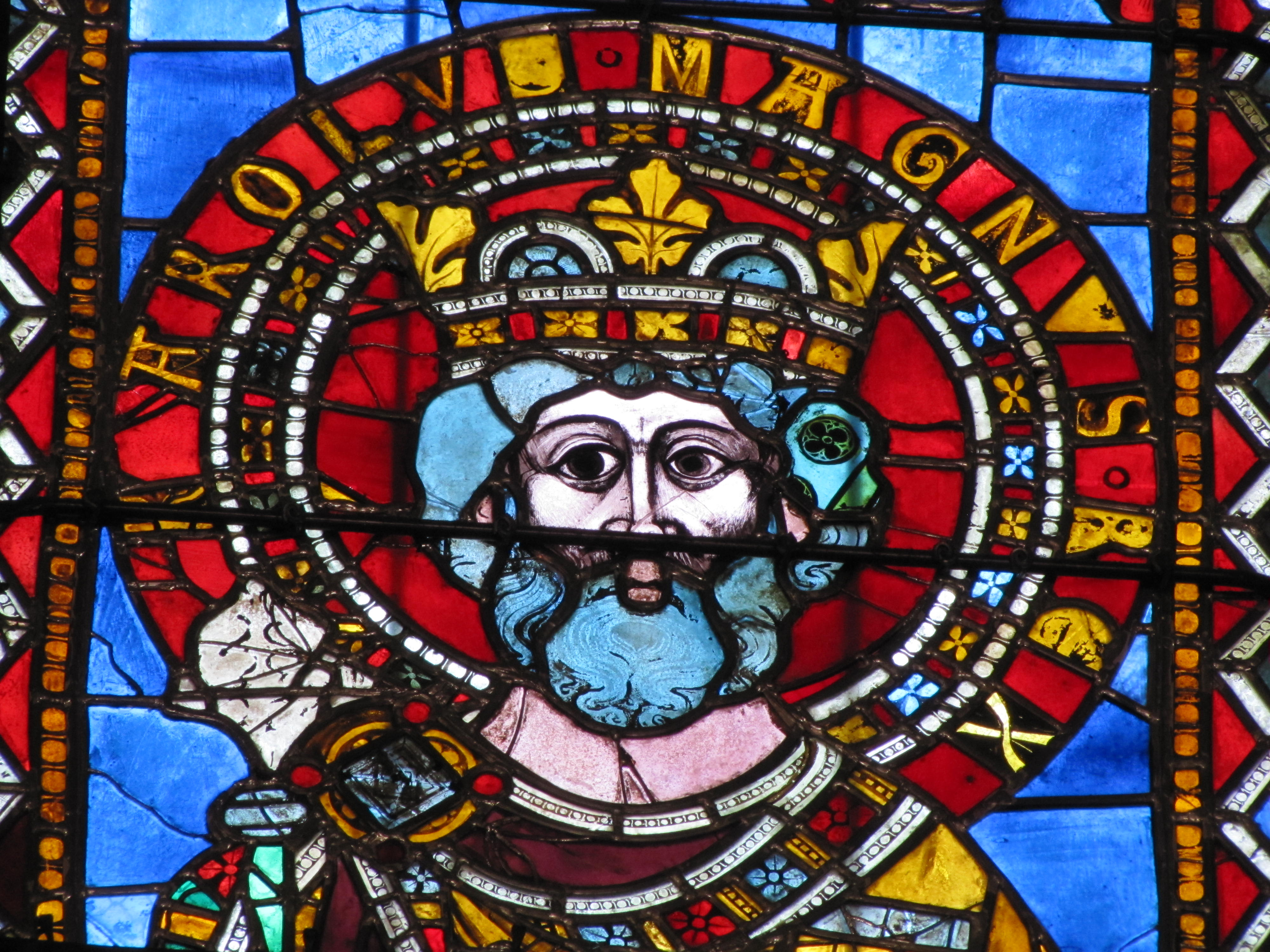
Charlemagne on one of the Kaiserfenster in Strasbourg Cathedral, late 12th century

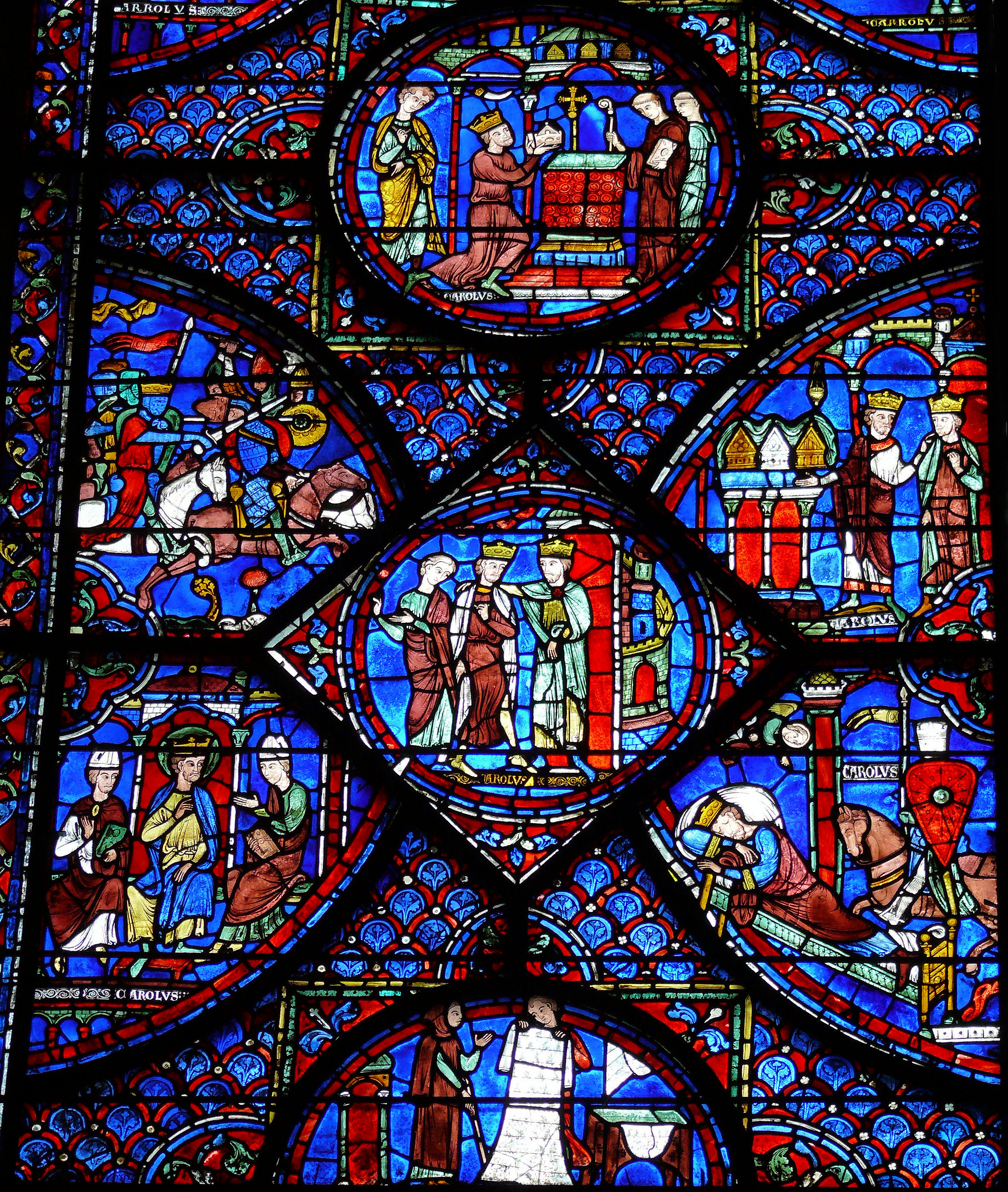
Scenes from the life of Charlemagne, Vitrail de Charlemagne at Chartres Cathedral, c. 1225

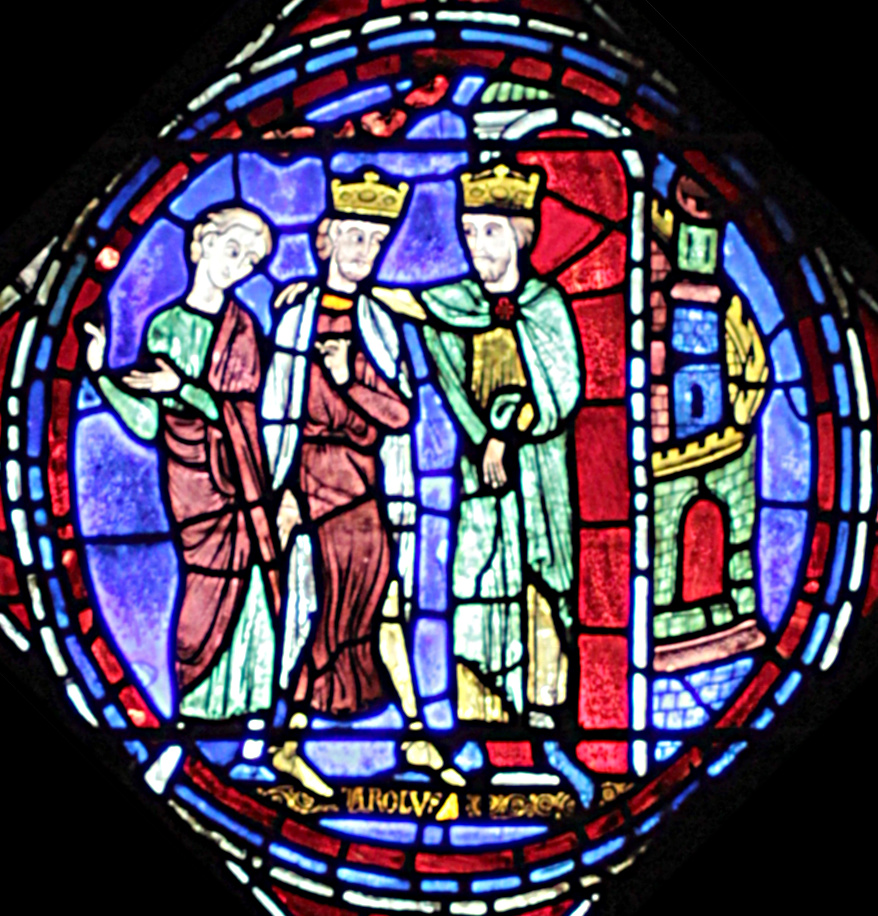
Charlemagne and Constantine, on the Vitrail de Charlemagne

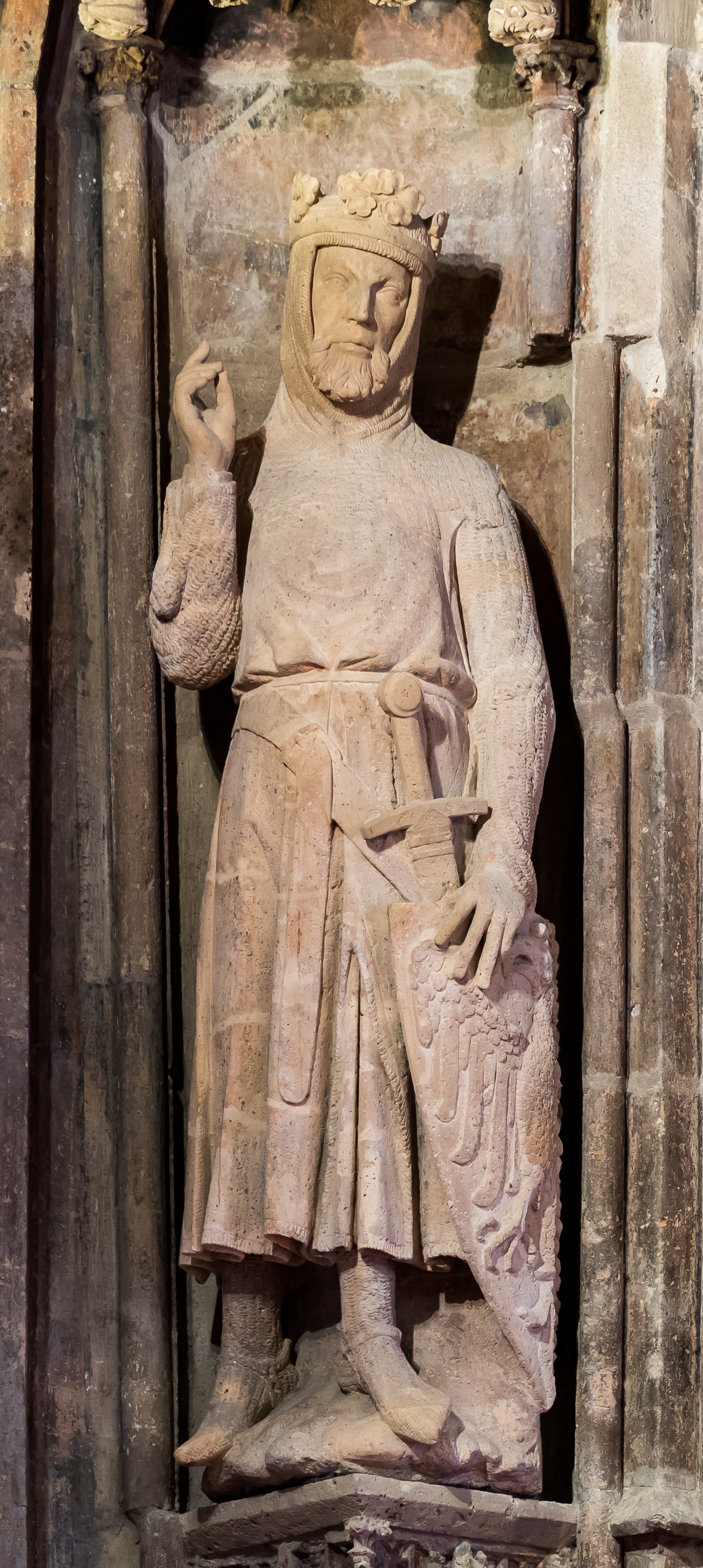
Charlemagne as one of the Nine Worthies, Cologne City Hall, 13th century

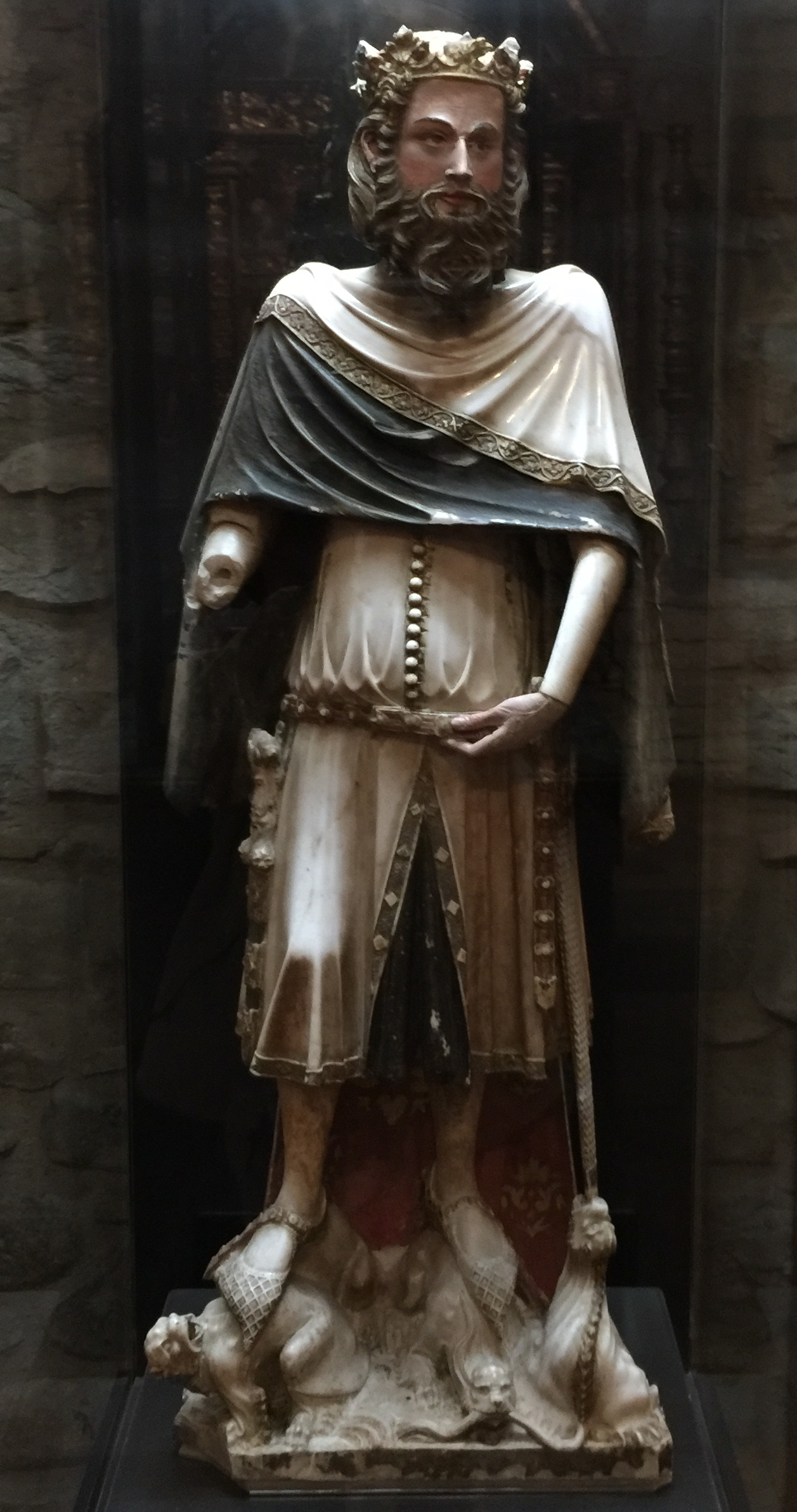
Saint Charlemagne by Jaume Cascalls, 1345, Girona Cathedral

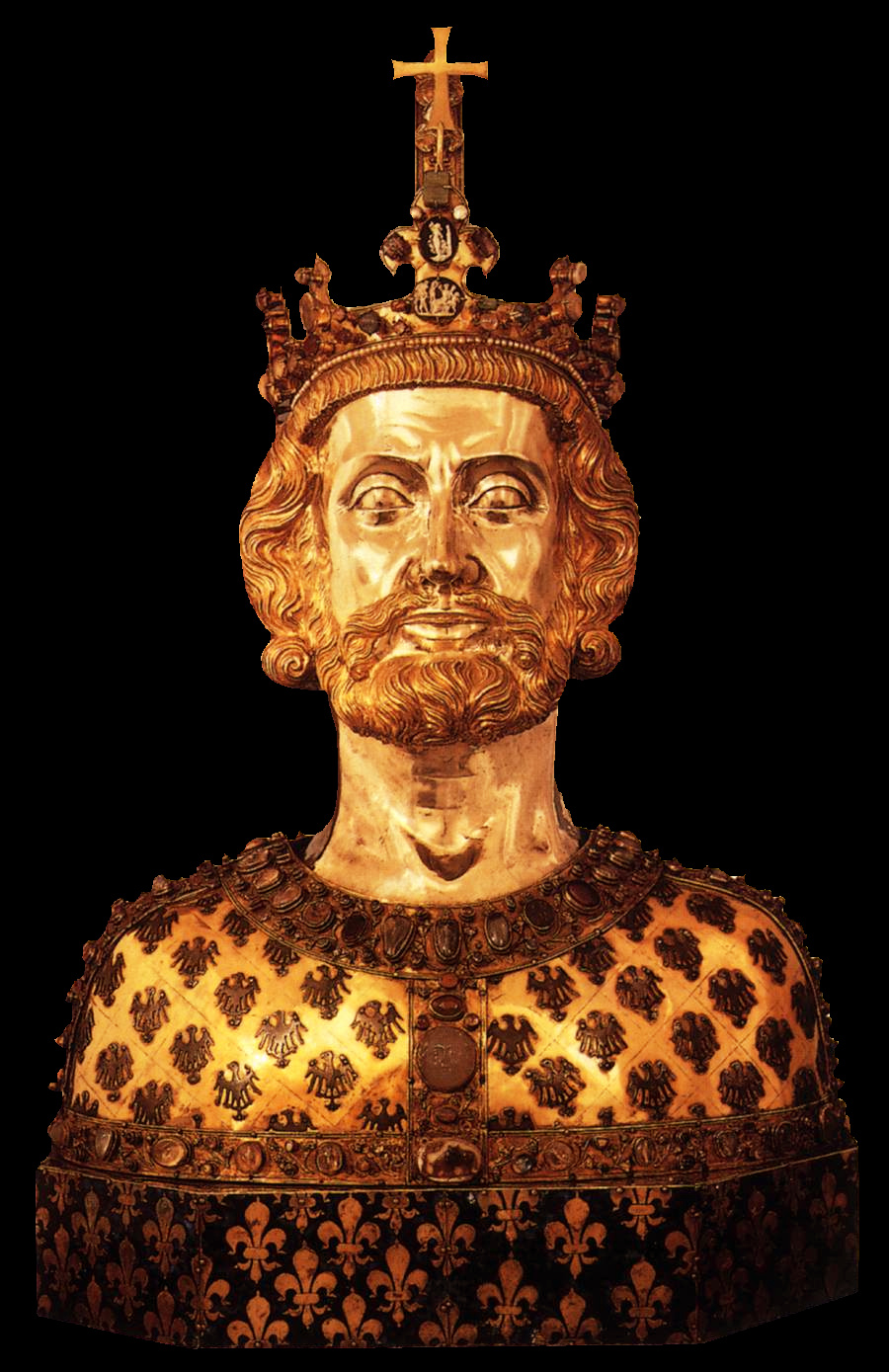
Bust of Charlemagne, 1349, Aachen Cathedral Treasury

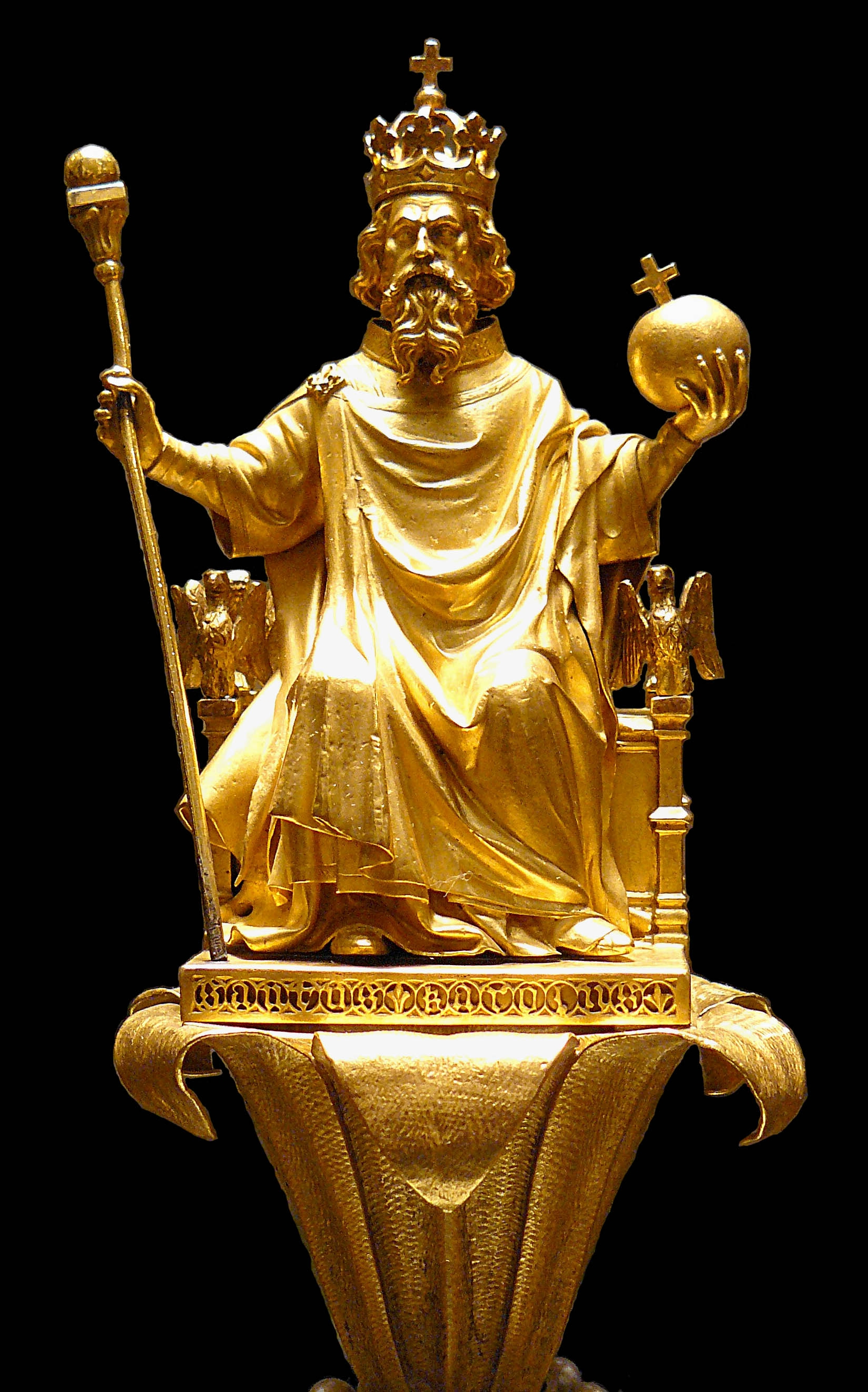
Charlemagne on the Scepter of Charles V, 1370s, Louvre

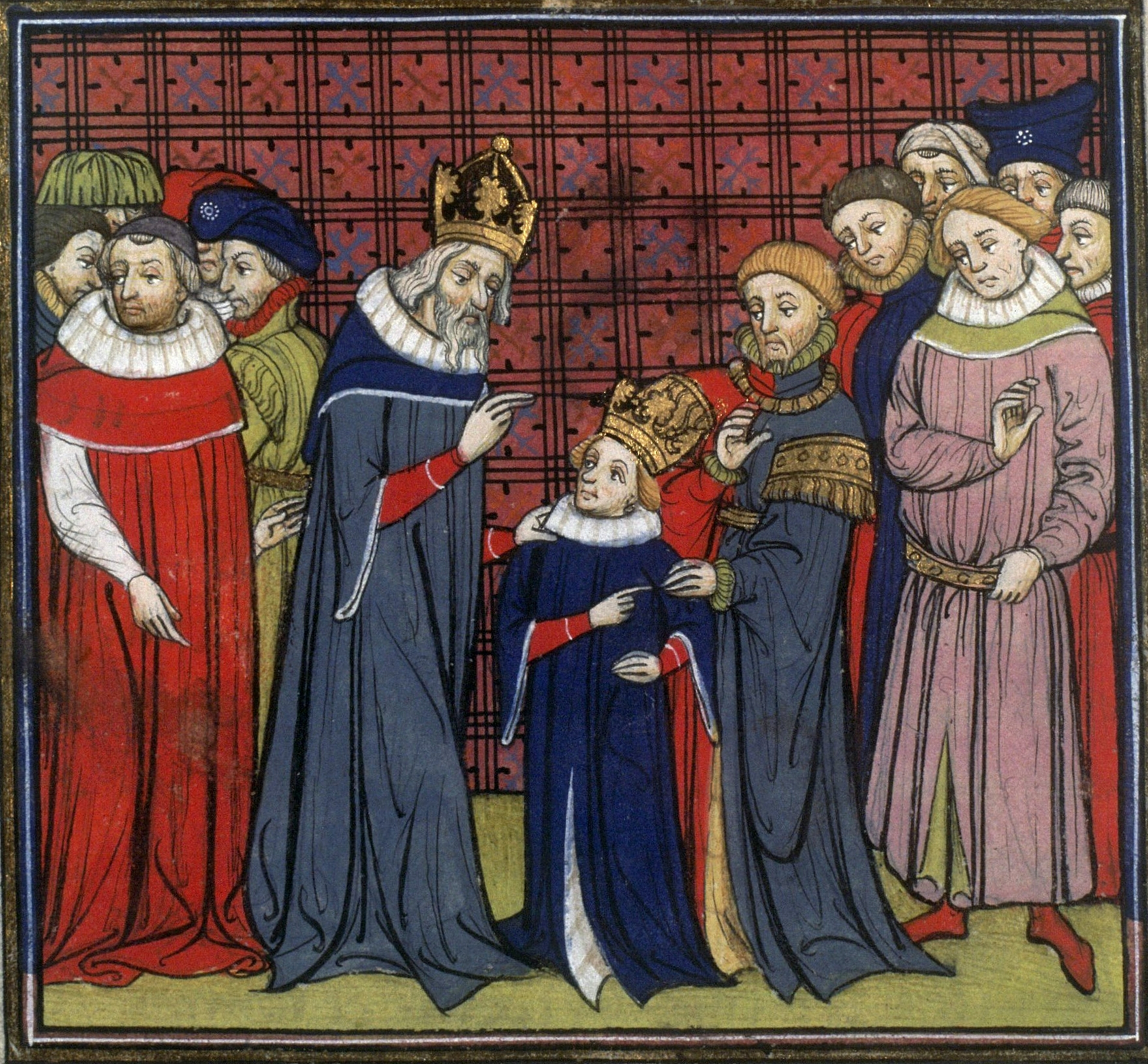
Charlemagne crowning Louis the Pious, Grandes Chroniques de France, 14th–15th centuries

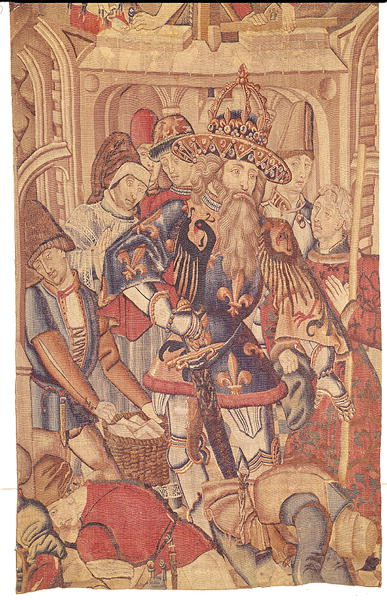
Charlemagne tapestry, 15th century, Musée des Beaux-Arts de Dijon

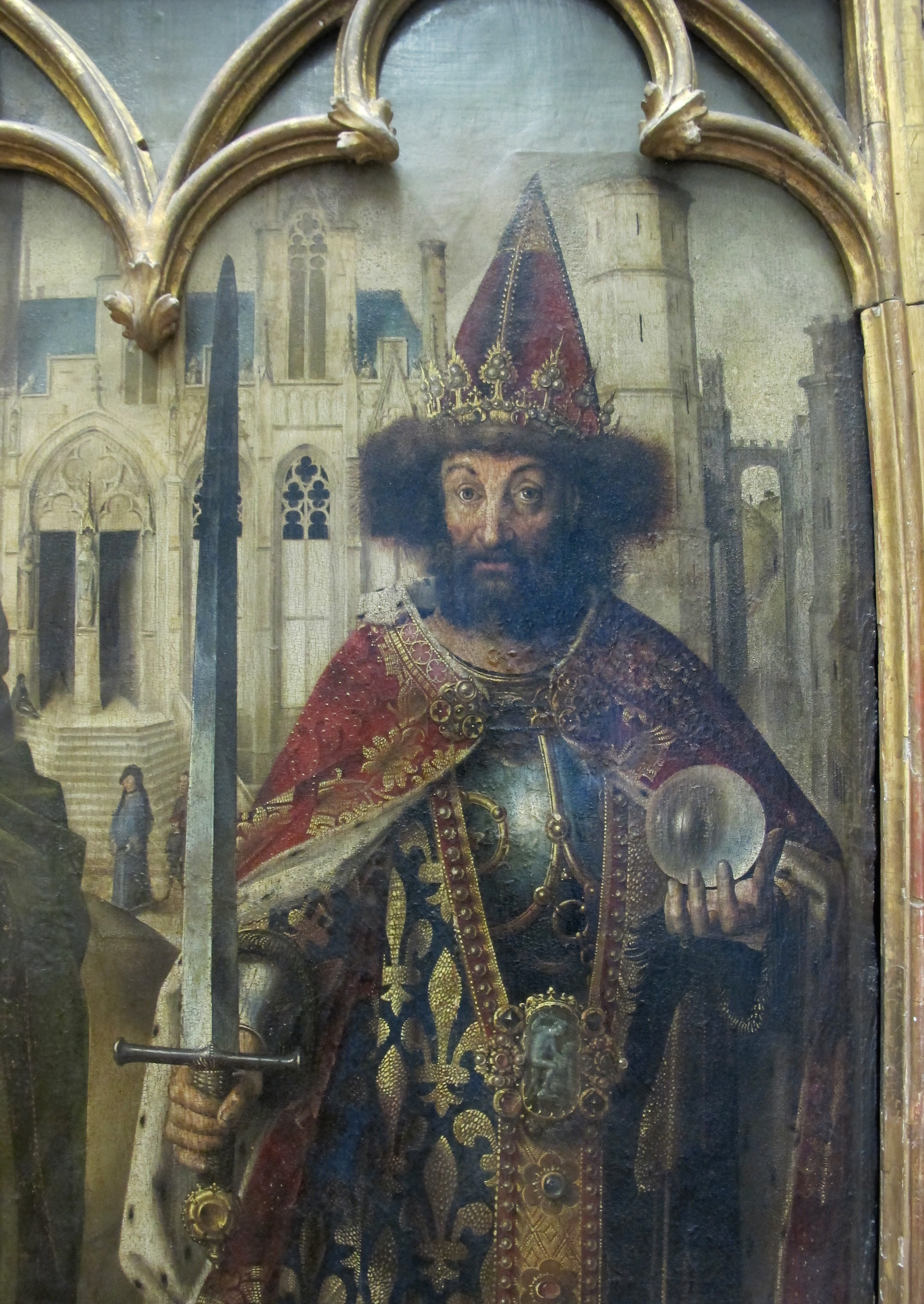
Saint Charlemagne in the Crucifixion of the Parlement de Paris, mid-15th century, Louvre

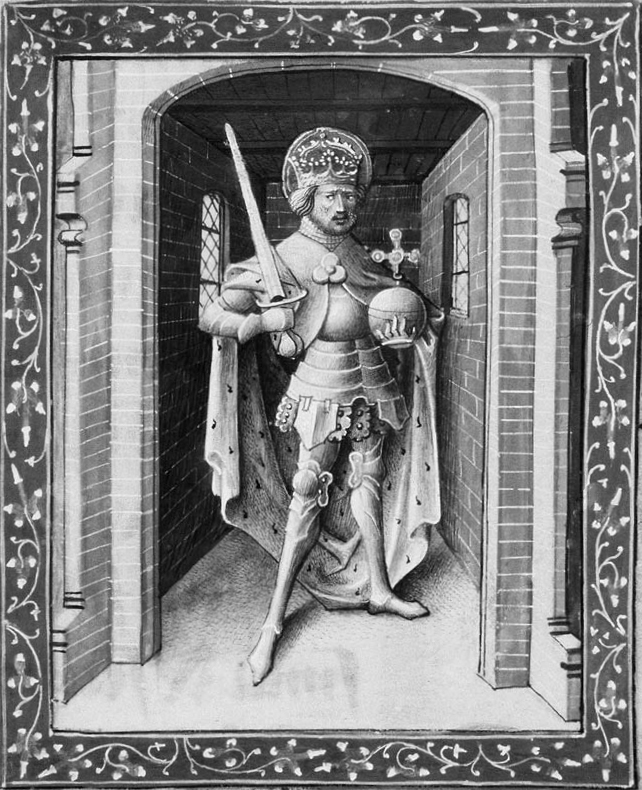
Charlemagne in the book of hours of Philip the Good, by Jean Le Tavernier, 1450s

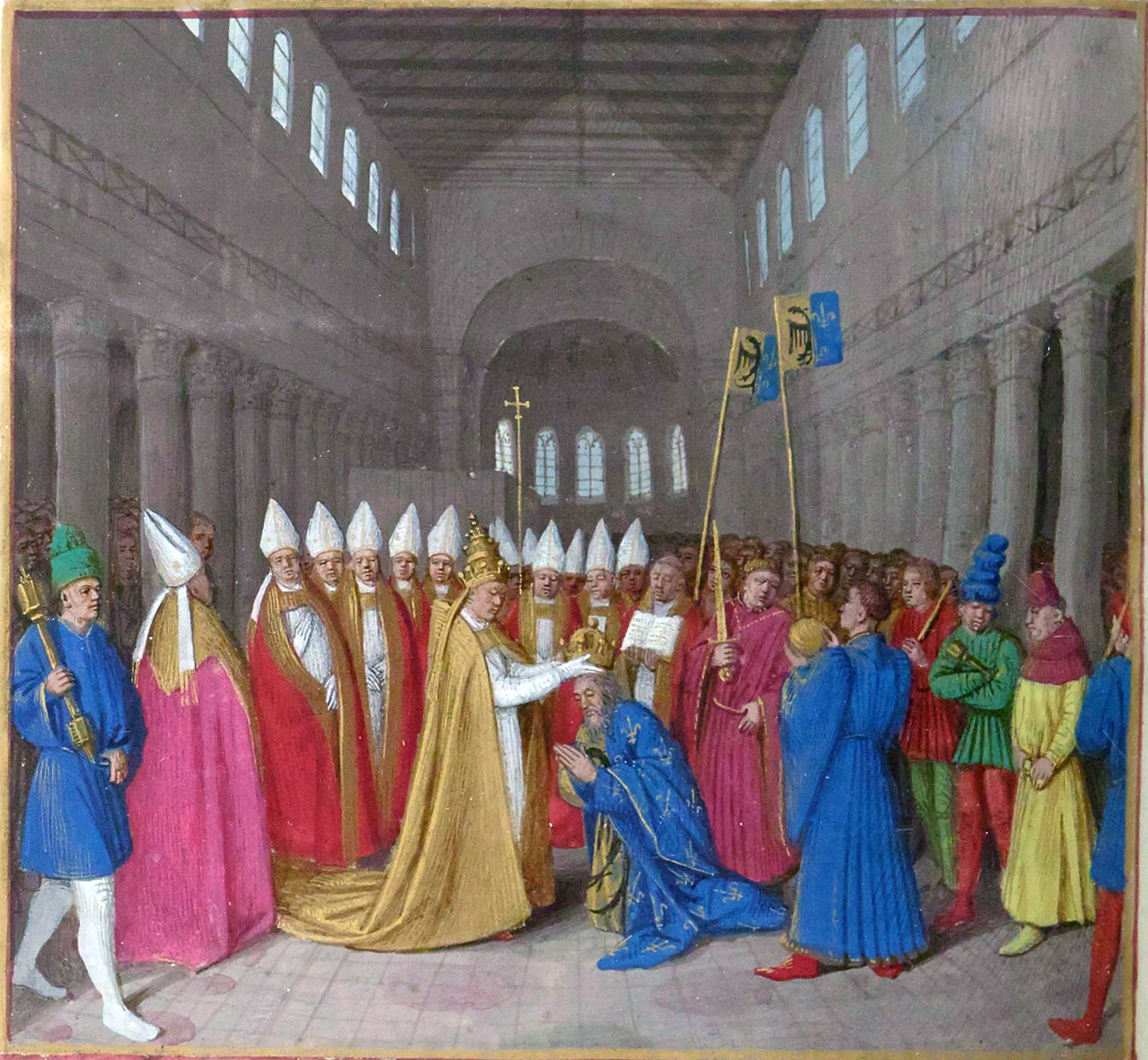
Coronation of Charlemagne in the Grandes Chroniques de France, by Jean Fouquet, 1450s

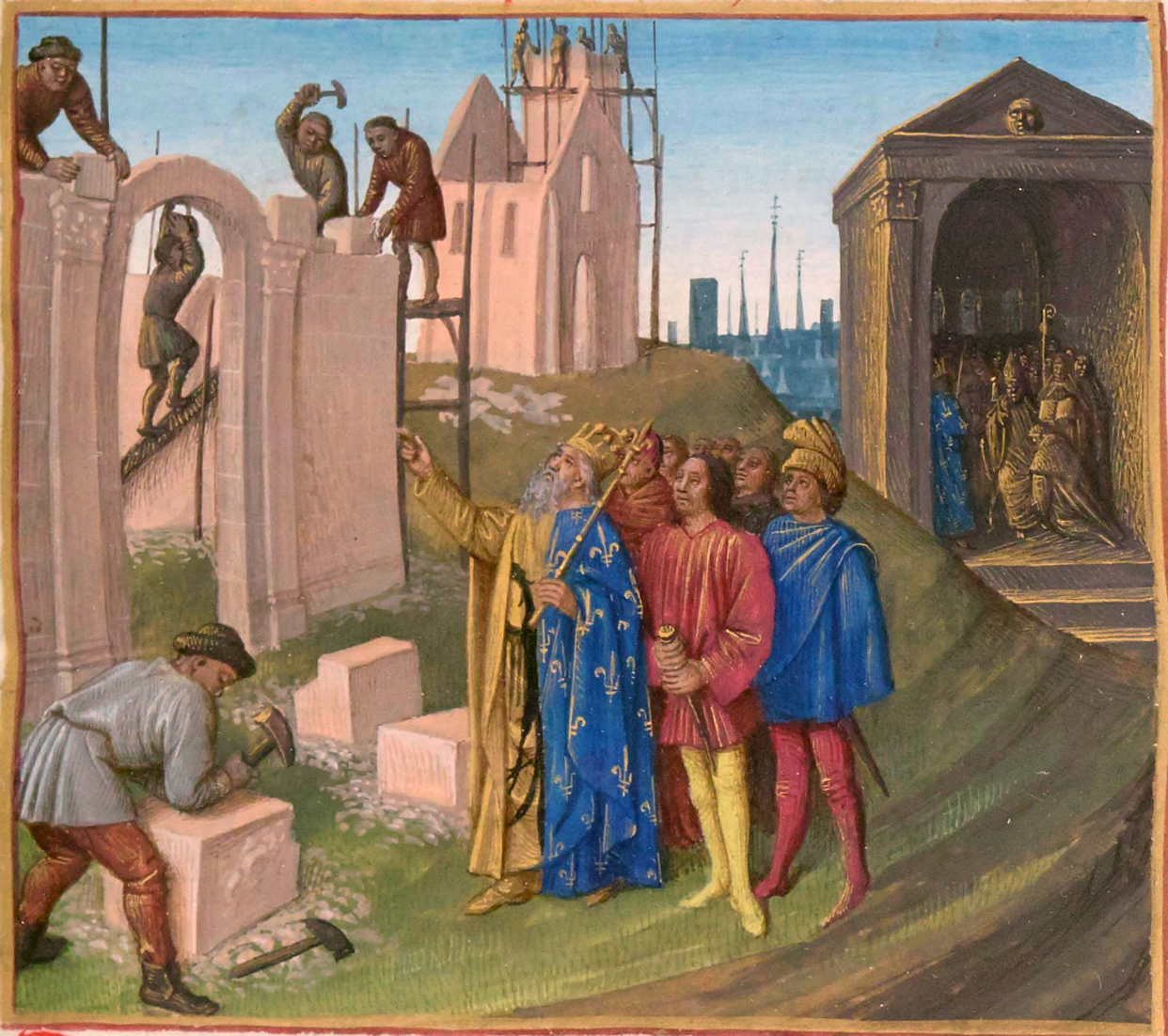
Charlemagne surveying the works of the Palatine Chapel, Aachen, by Jean Fouquet, 1450s

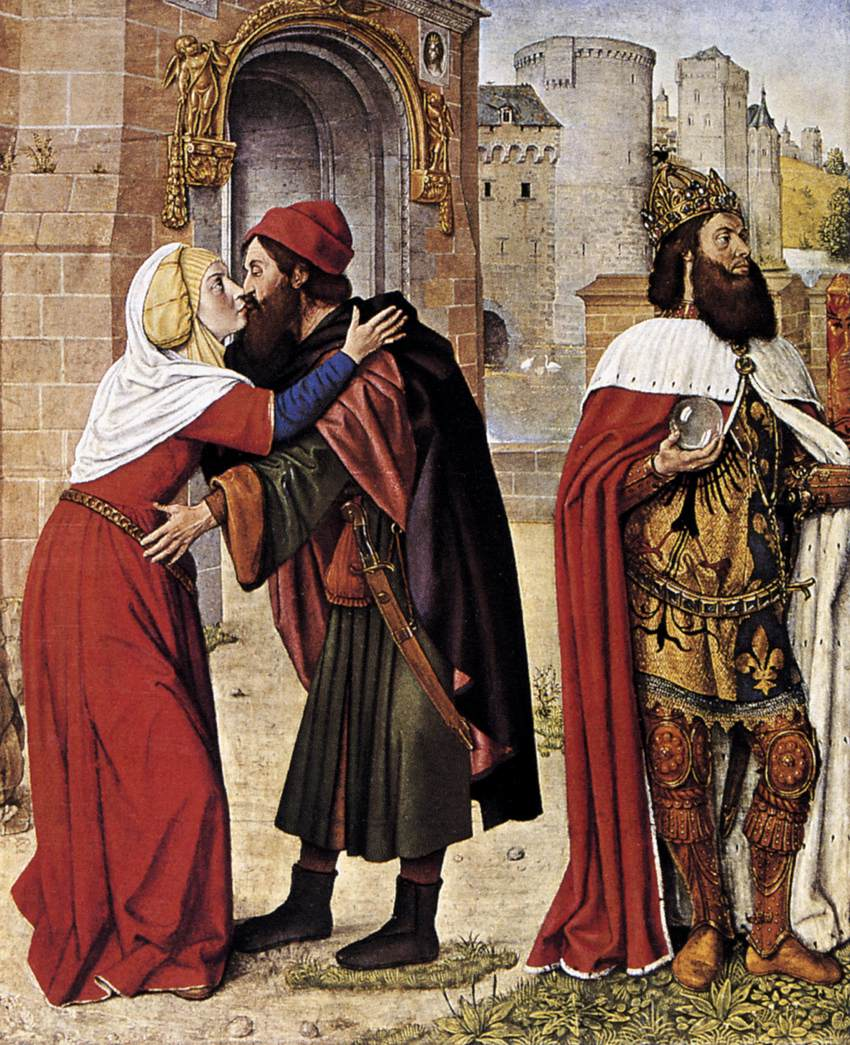
Charlemagne (right) by Jean Hey, 1488, National Gallery

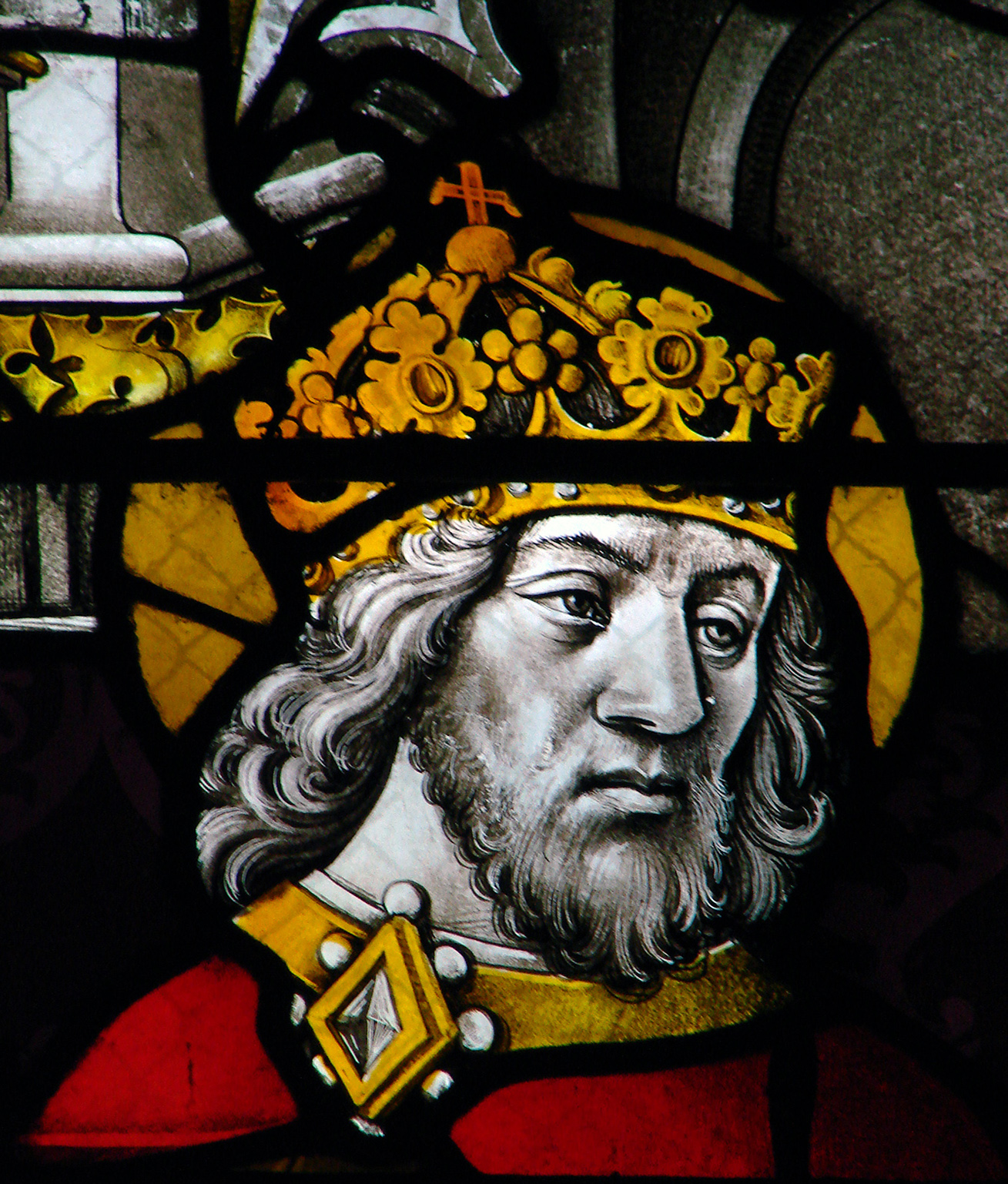
Charlemagne on the Window of the Dukes at Moulins Cathedral, late 15th century

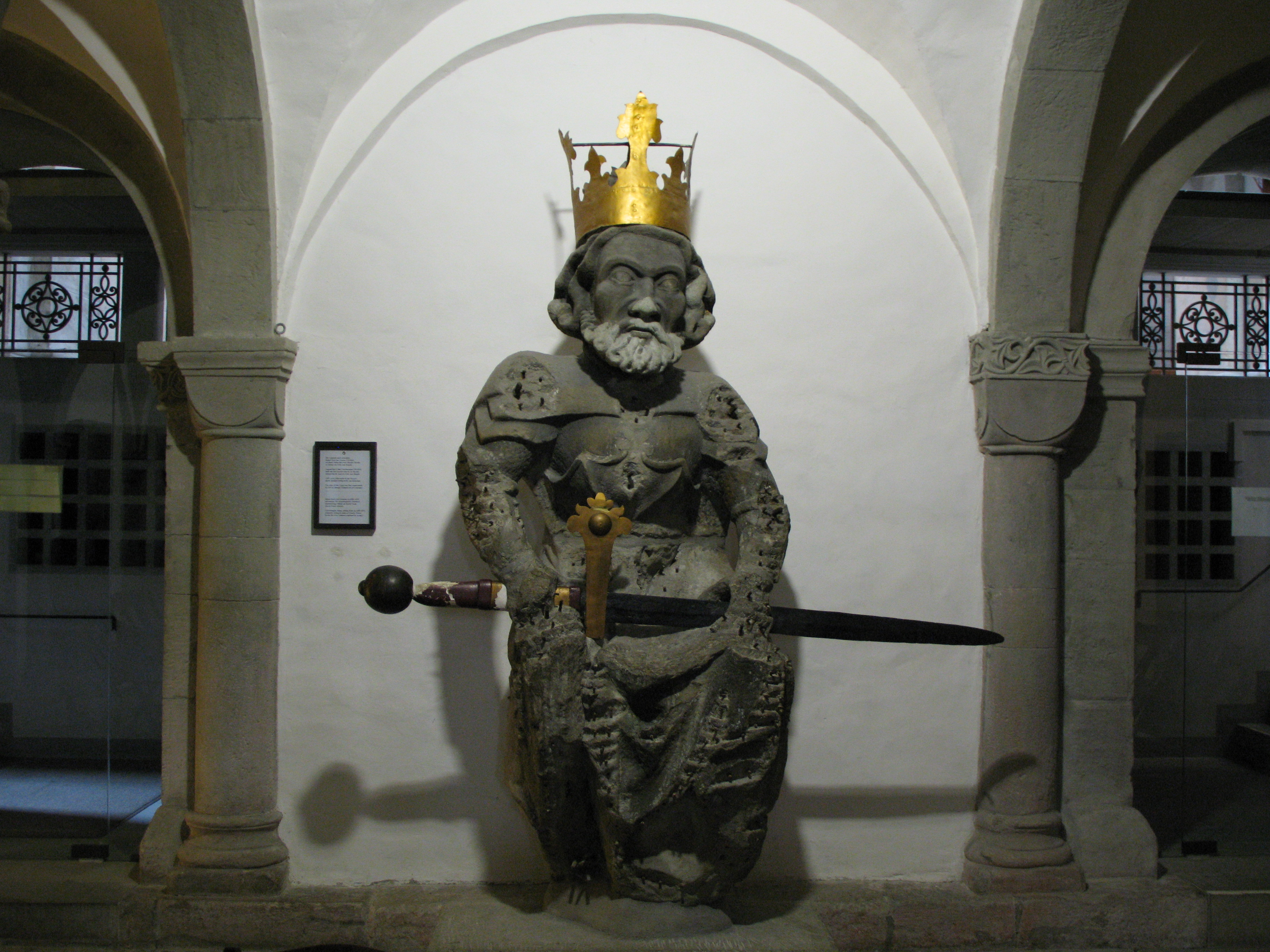
Charlemagne statue, Grossmünster at Zürich, late 15th century

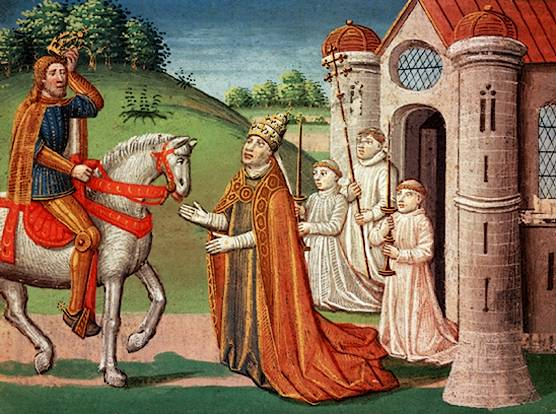
Charlemagne rescuing Pope Adrian I, by Antoine Vérard, 1493

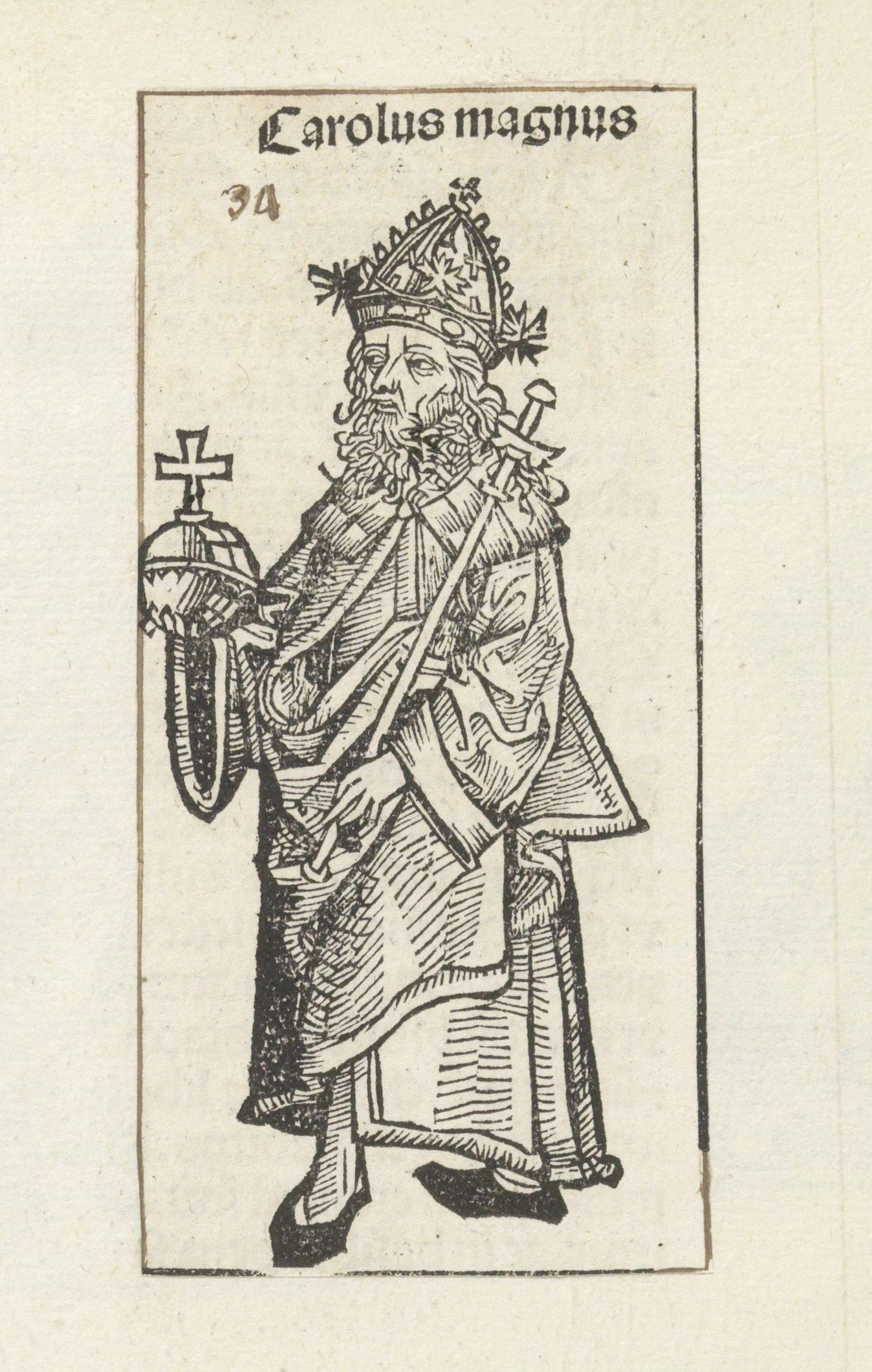
Charlemagne on a print from the Nuremberg workshop of Michael Wolgemut and Wilhelm Pleydenwurff, 1493

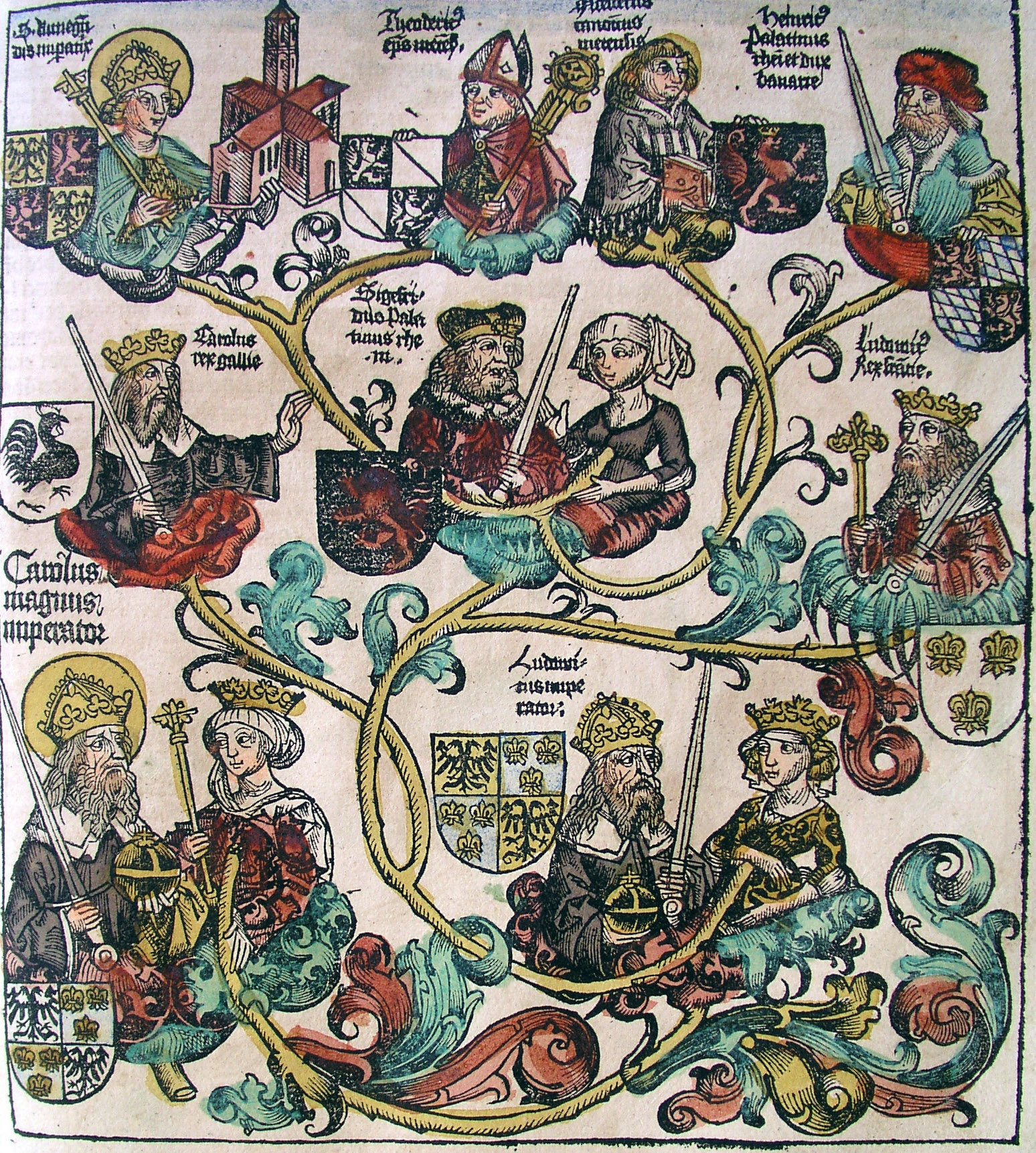
Charlemagne (lower left corner) and his descendants, Nuremberg Chronicle, late 15th century

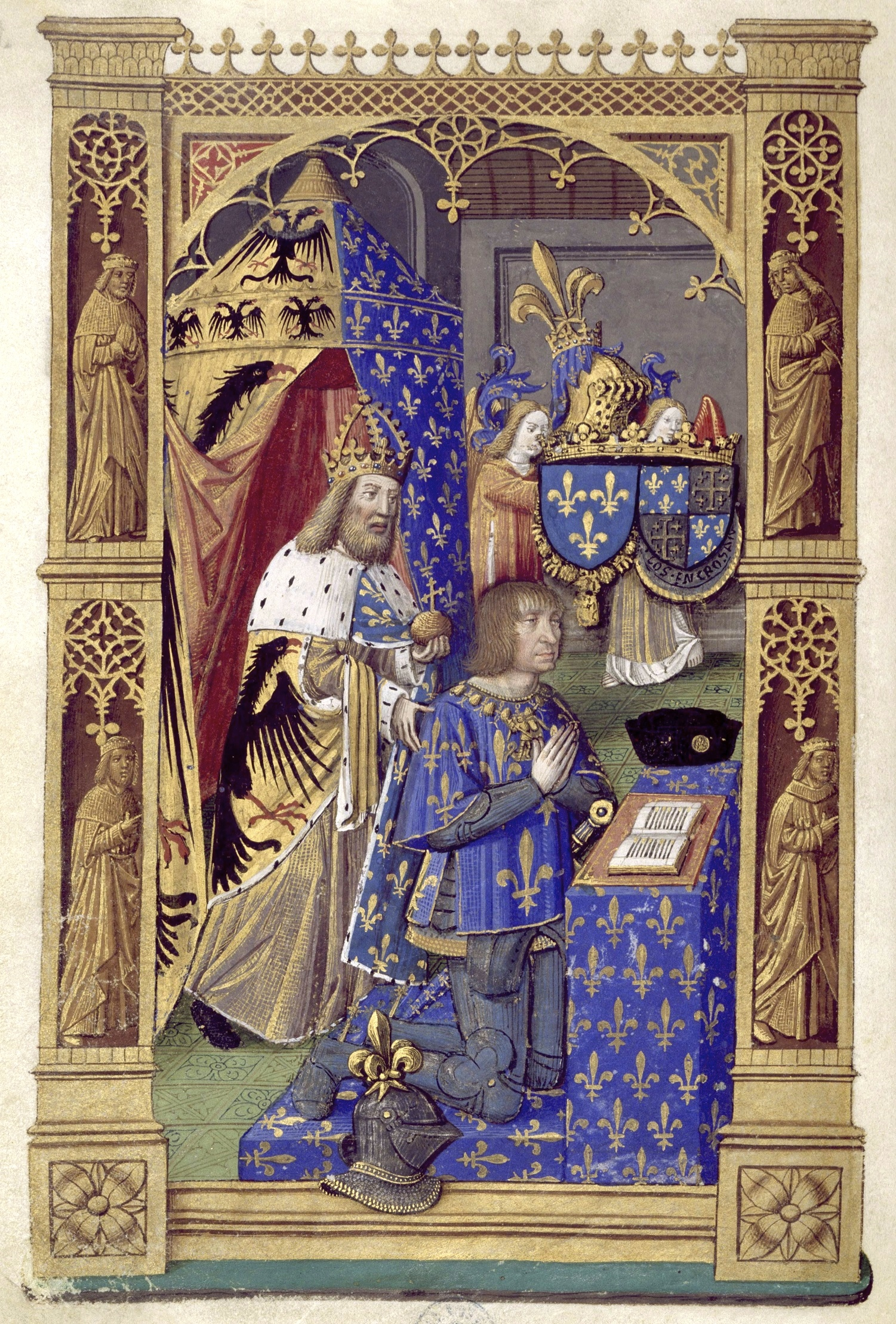
Charlemagne protecting the king of France, by the Master of Jacques de Besançon, c. 1500, Livre d'heures de Charles VIII

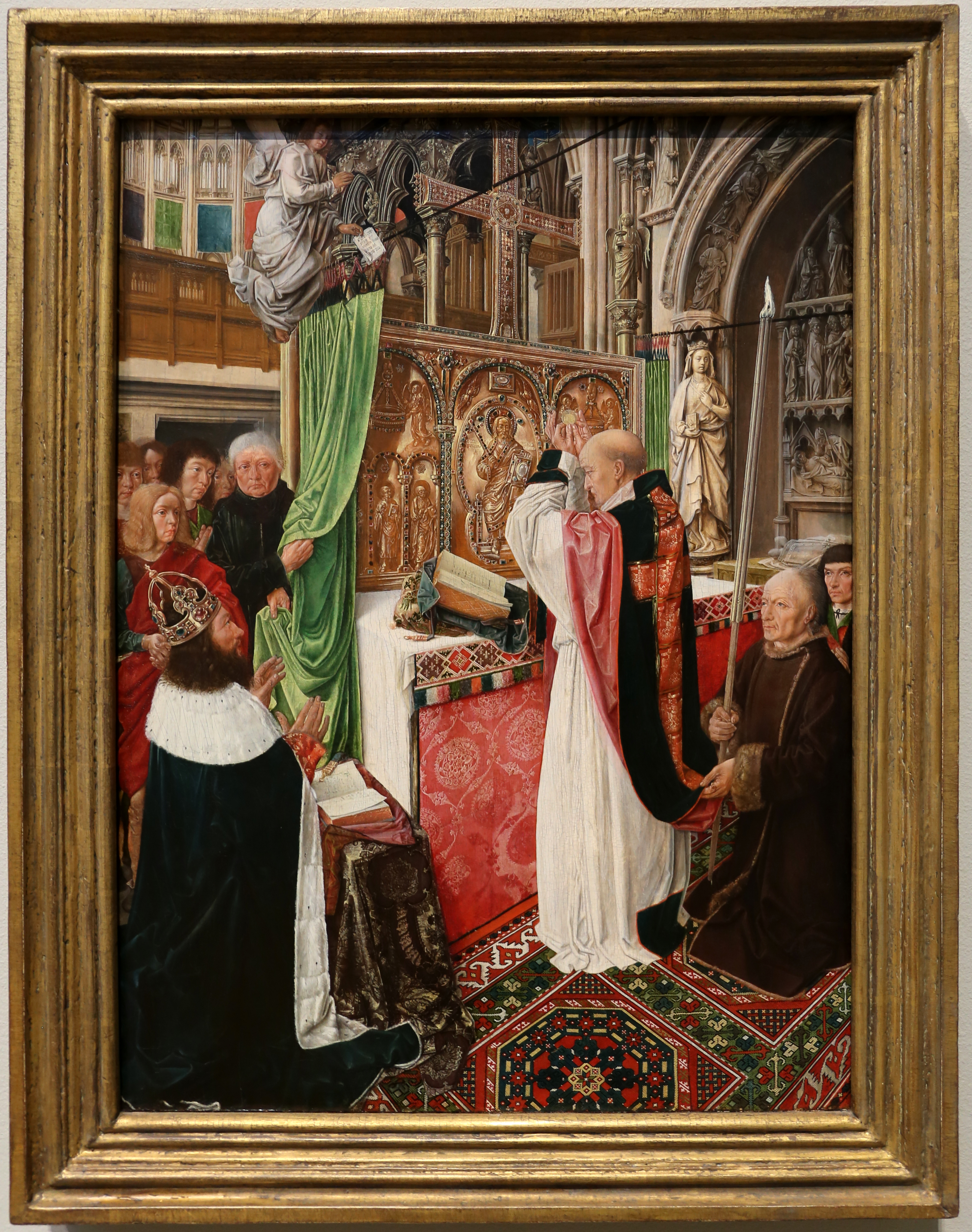
Charlemagne (left) attending mass, by the Master of Saint Giles, c. 1500, National Gallery

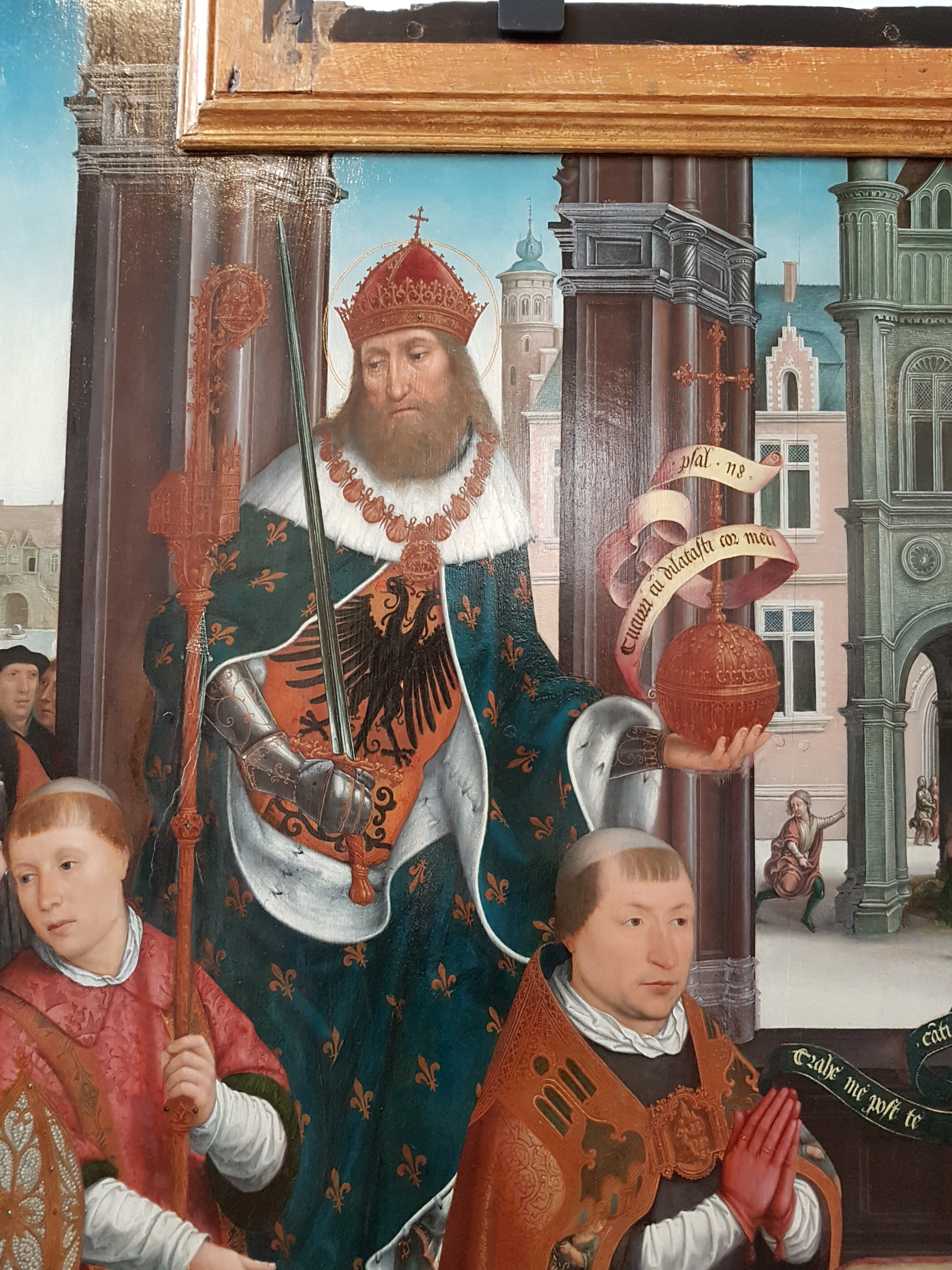
Charlemagne on the Polyptyque d'Anchin by Jehan Bellegambe, c. 1510, Musée de la Chartreuse de Douai

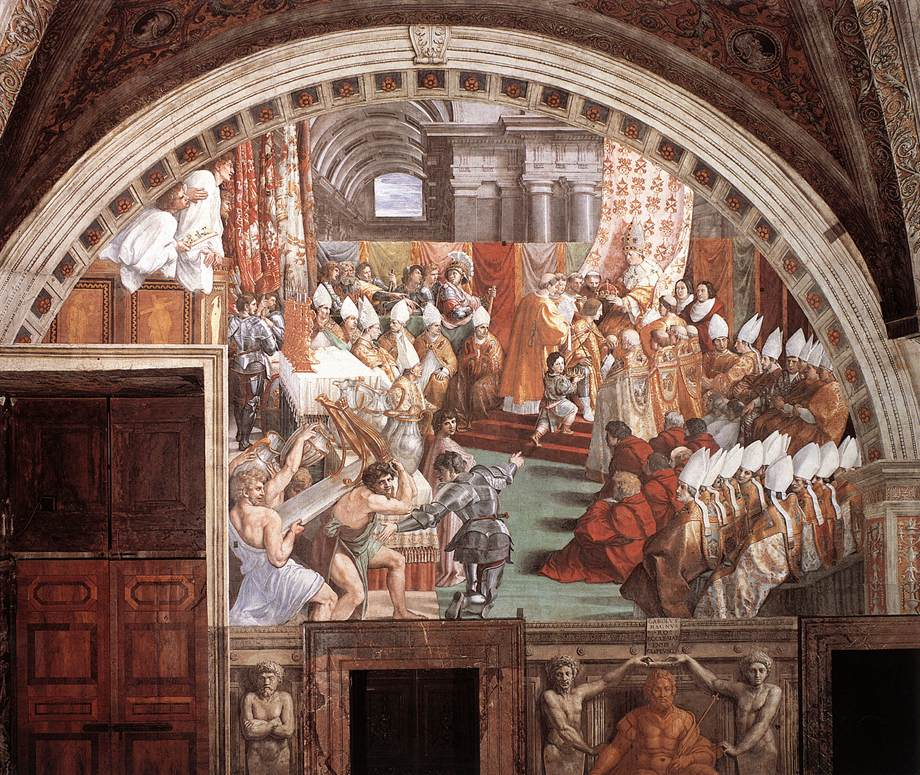
The Coronation of Charlemagne, by Raphael's workshop, 1510s, Raphael Rooms

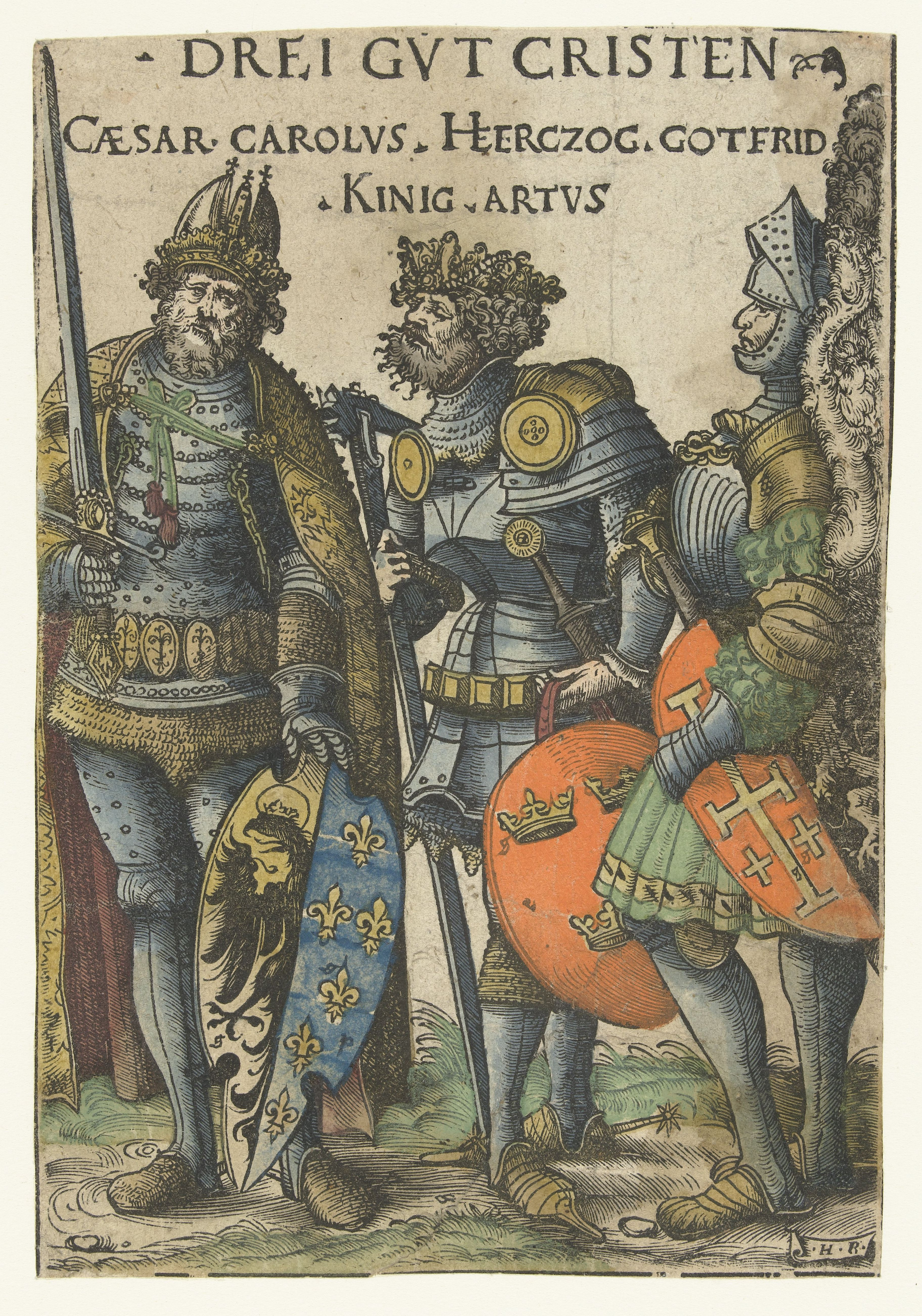
The Three Christian Worthies: Charlemagne, King Arthur and Godfrey of Bouillon, by Hans Burgkmair, 1516–19

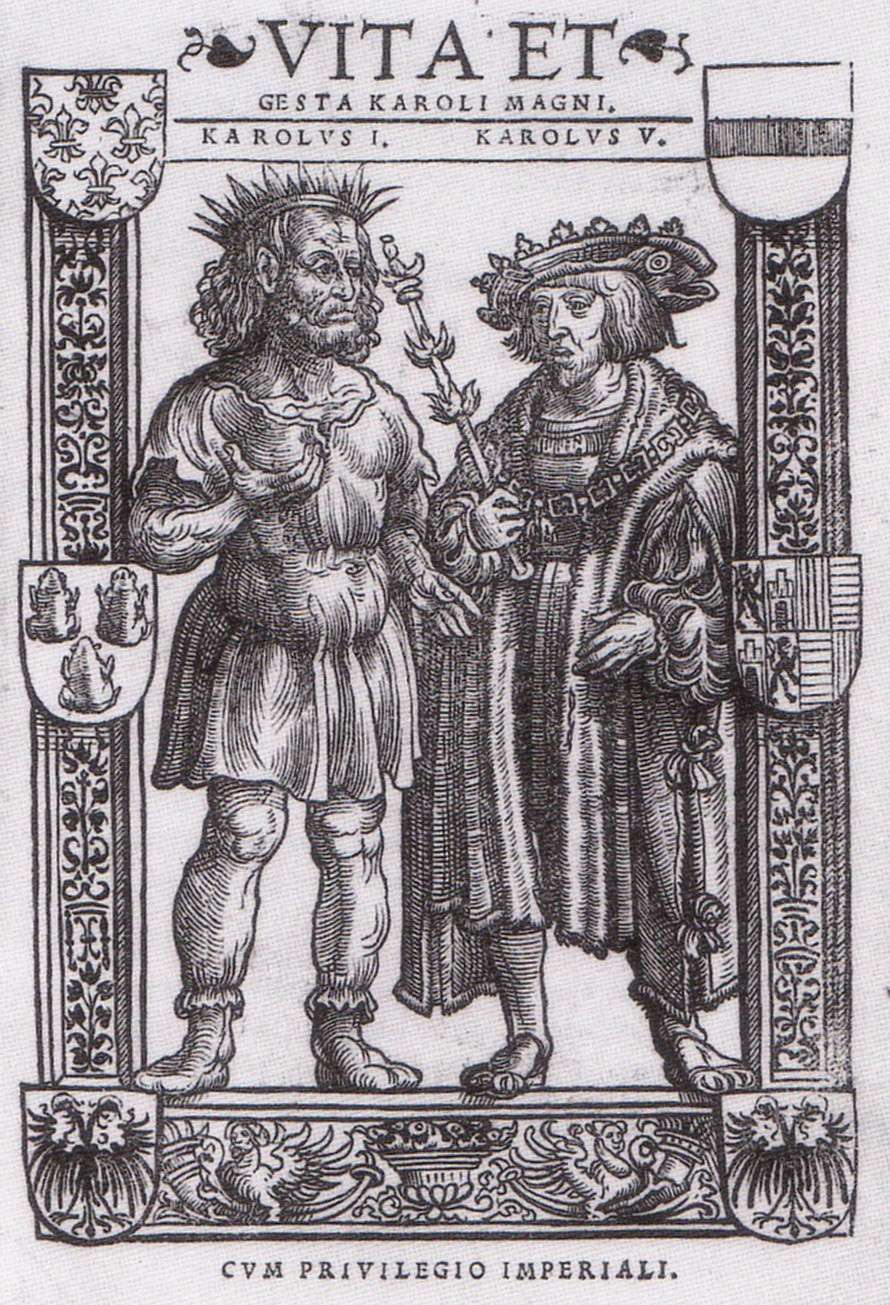
Charlemagne and Charles V, illustration of the Vita Karoli Magni by Anton Woensam, 1521

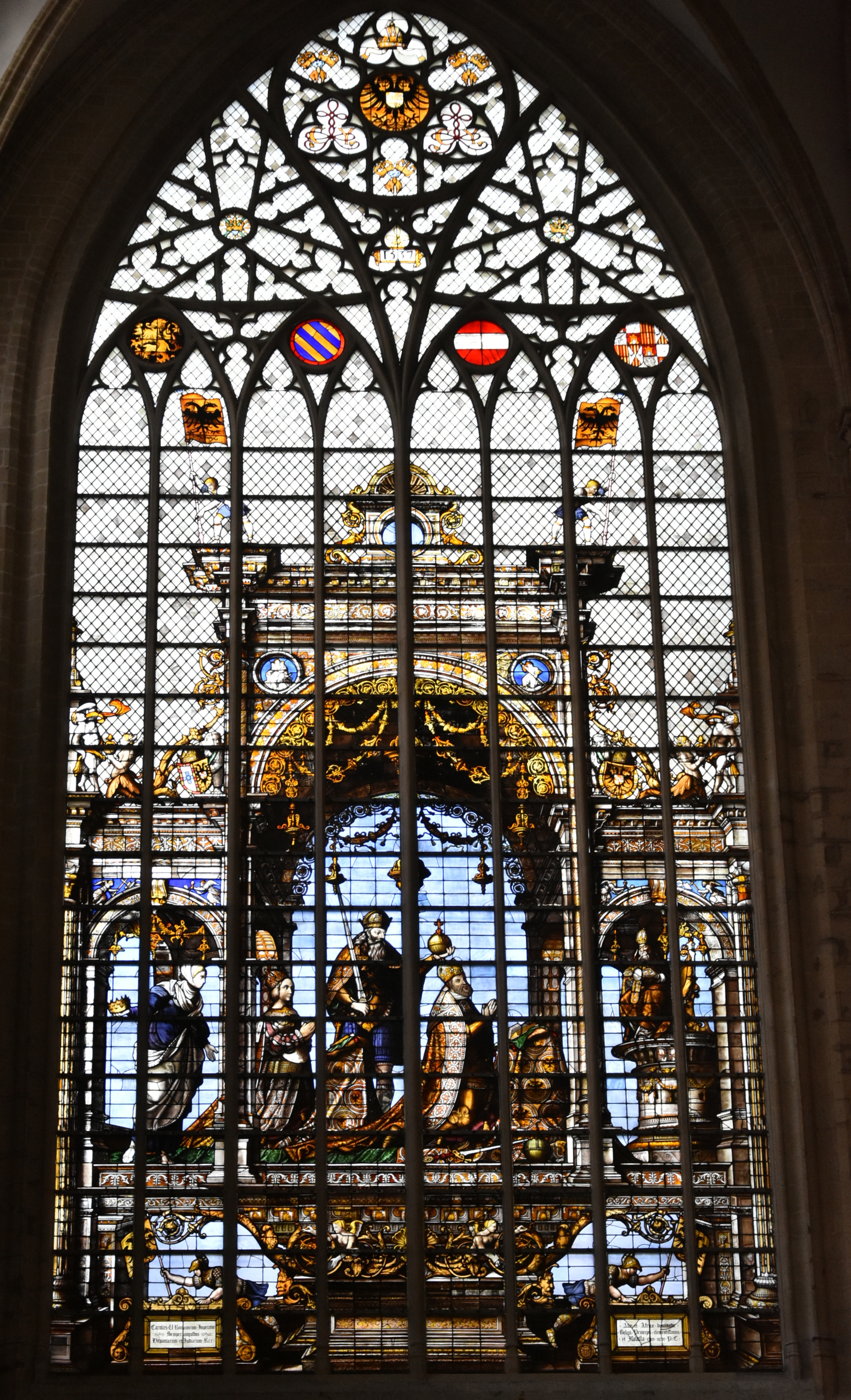
Charlemagne protecting Charles V, window by Jan Haeck after Bernard van Orley, 1538, Brussels Cathedral

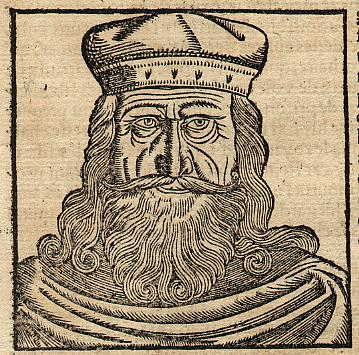
Charlemagne portrait in Sebastian Münster's Cosmographia, c. 1550

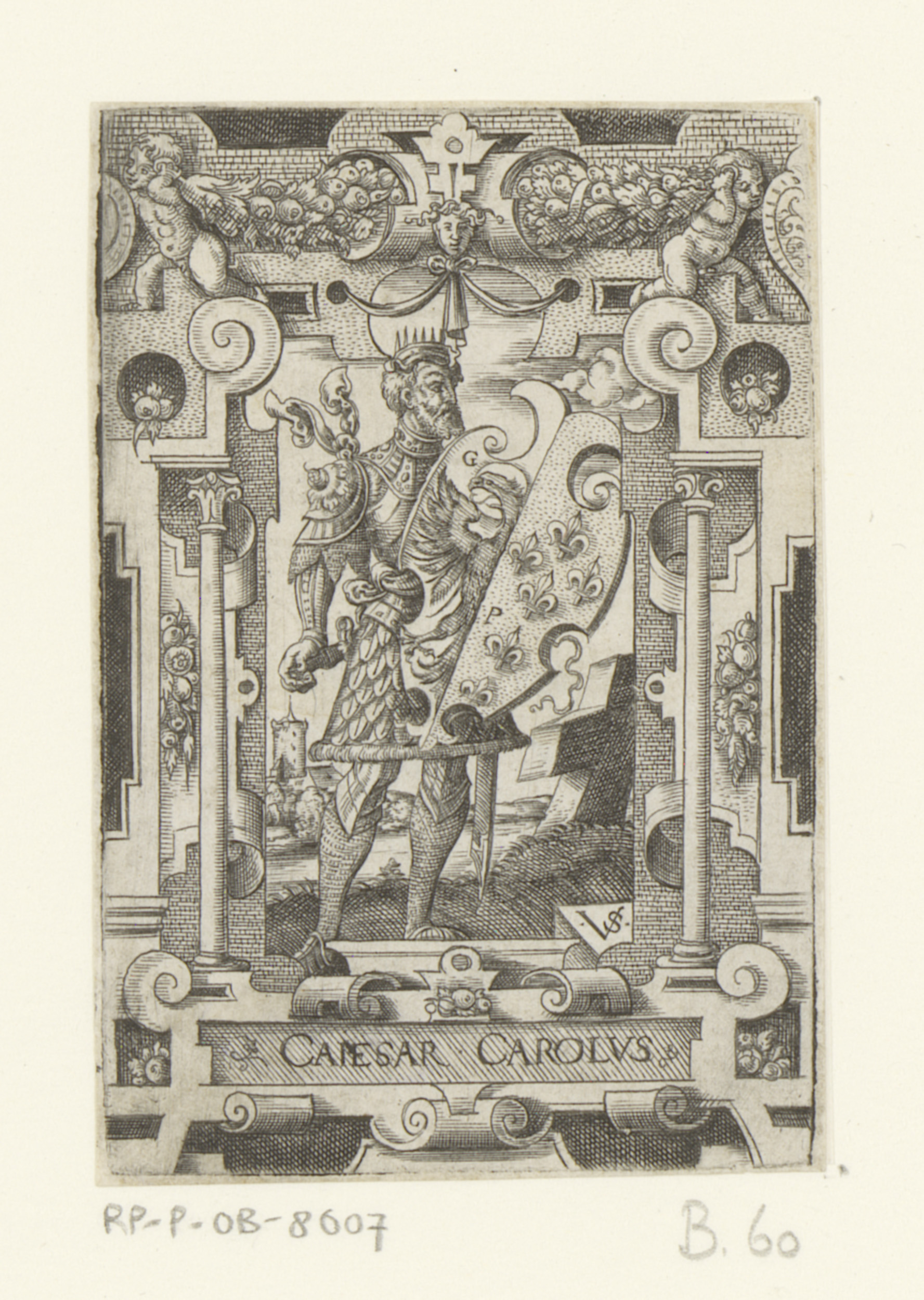
Charlemagne as one of the Nine Worthies by Virgil Solis, mid-16th century

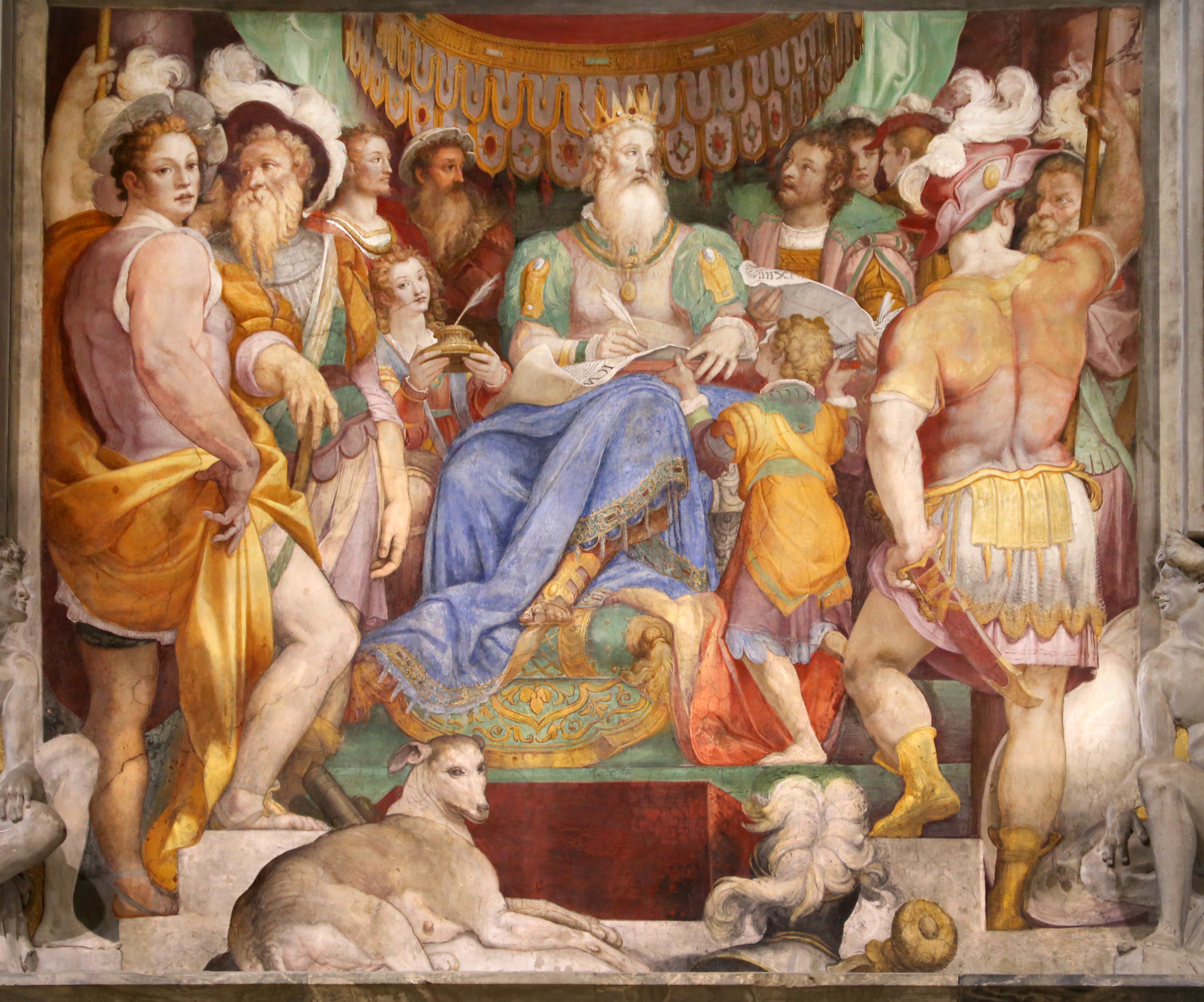
Charlemagne confirms the Donation of Pepin, Sala Regia (Vatican), by Taddeo Zuccari, 1564–65

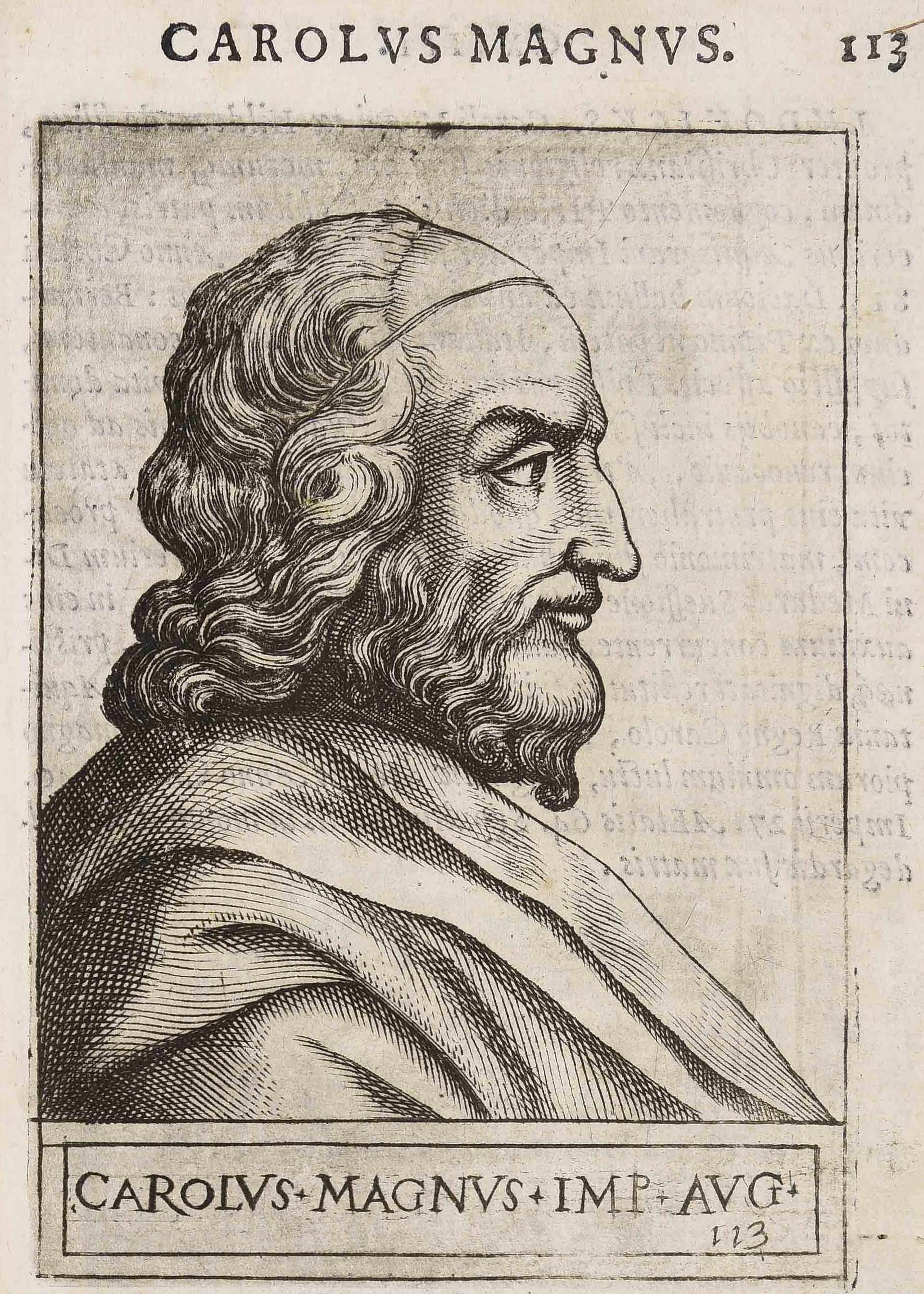
Charlemagne by Giovanni Battista de'Cavalieri, 1583

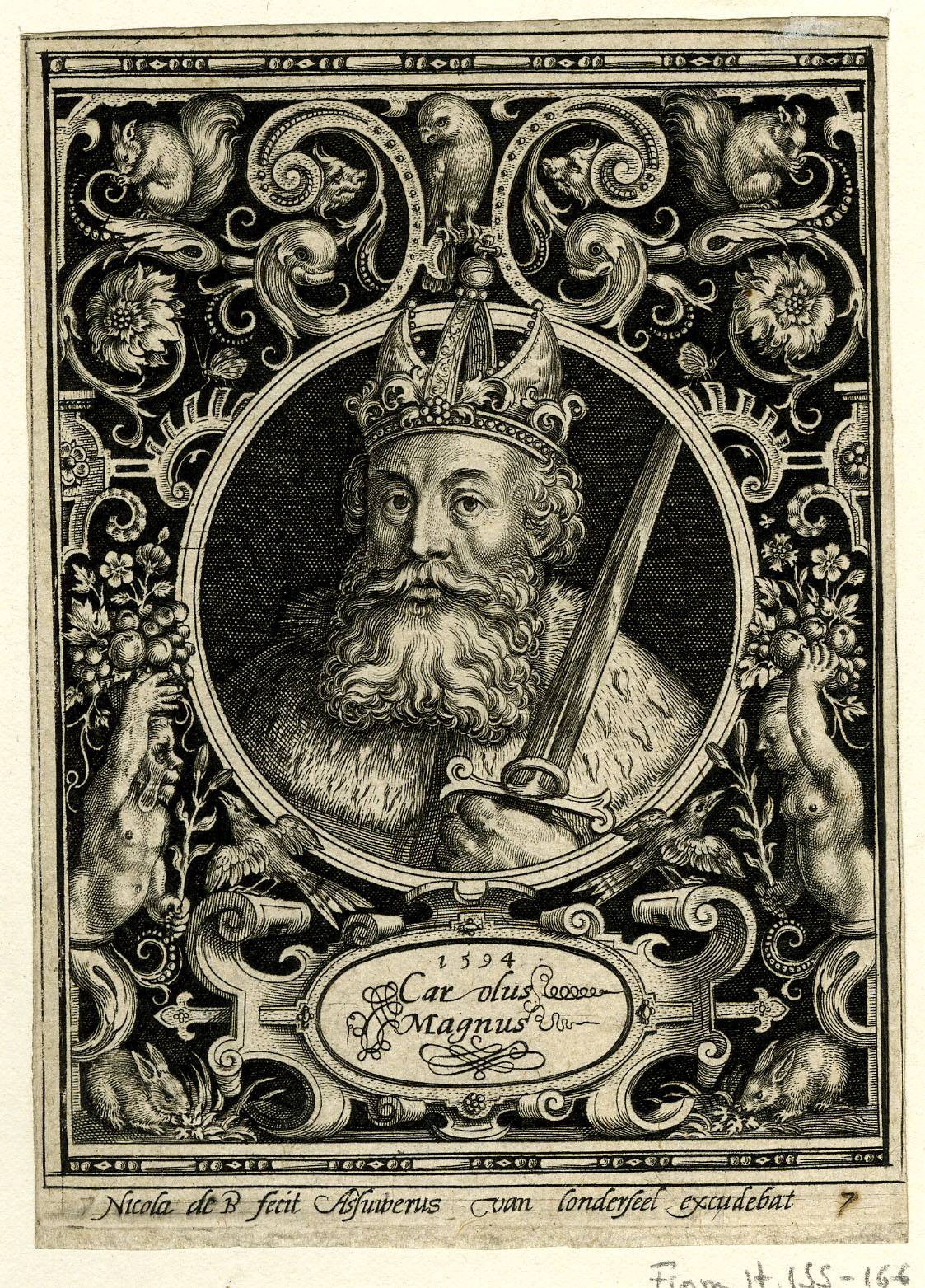
Charlemagne as one of the Nine Worthies by Nicolaes de Bruyn, 1594

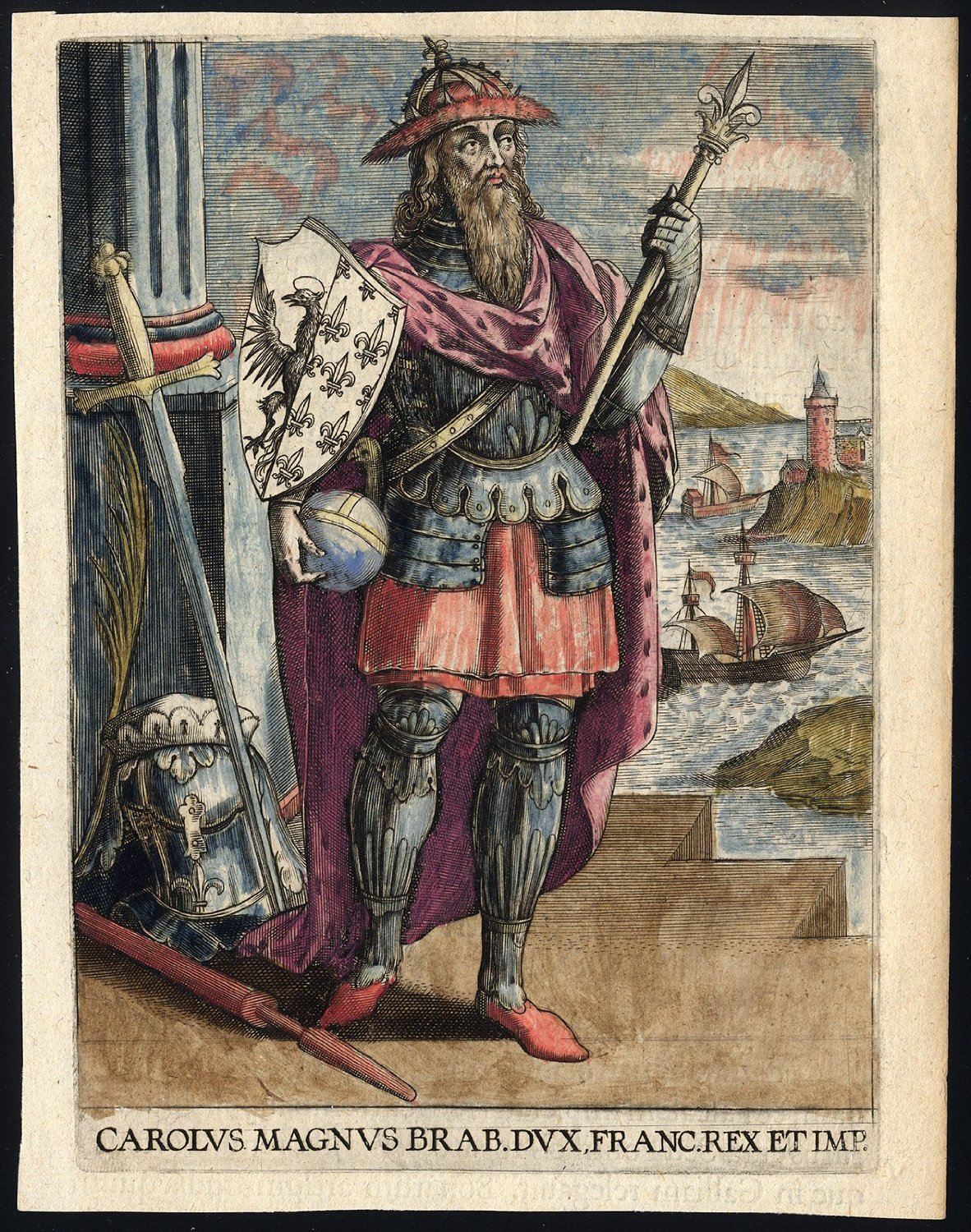
Charlemagne in Adrianus Barlandus's Chronicles of the Dukes of Brabant, 1603

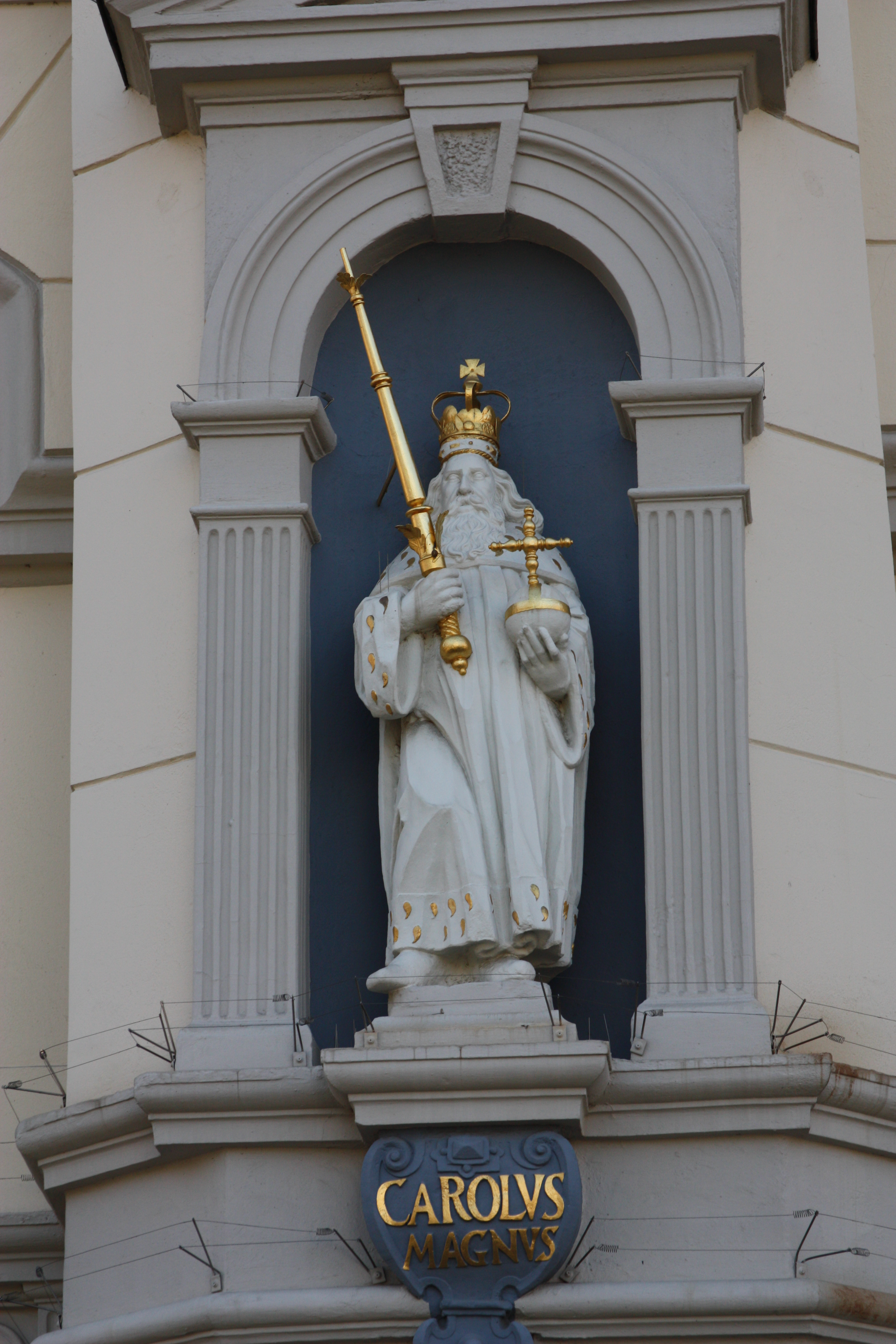
Charlemagne on the Town Hall of Lüneburg, by Hans Schröder, c. 1605

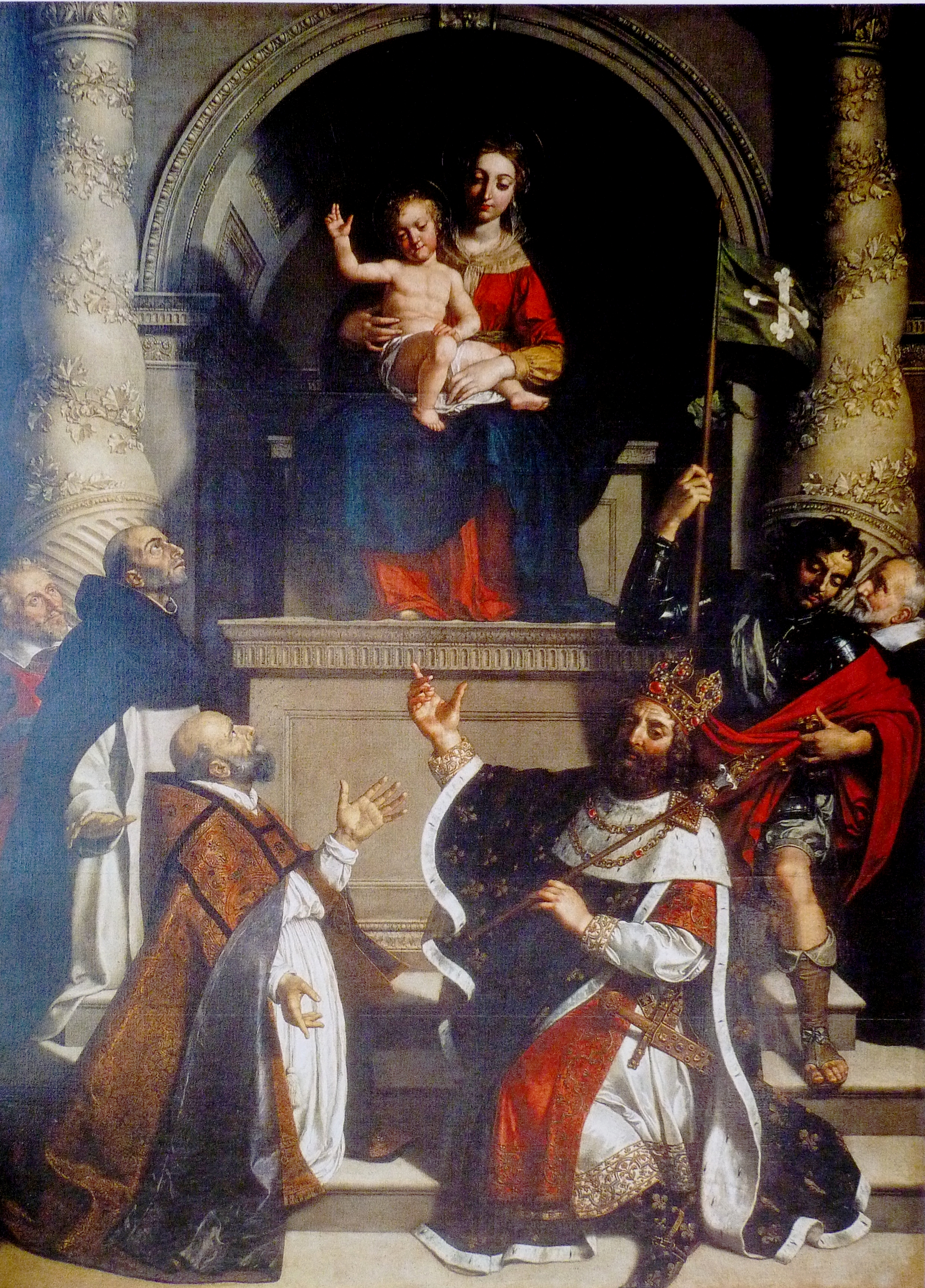
Charlemagne on the Madonna of Vic by Frans Pourbus the Younger, 1617, Saint-Nicolas-des-Champs, Paris

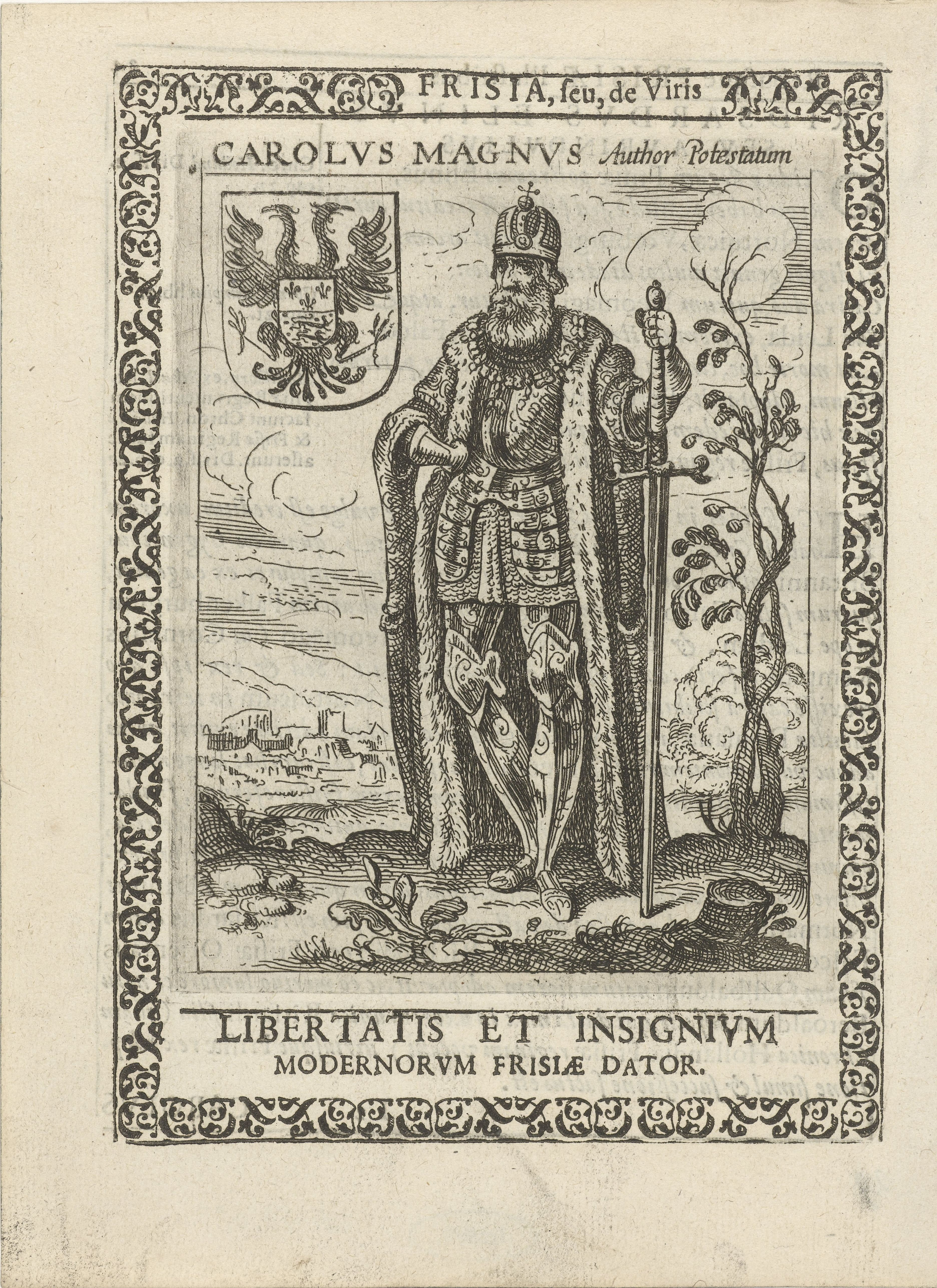
Charlemagne legislator of Frisia, by Pieter Feddes van Harlingen, 1618–20

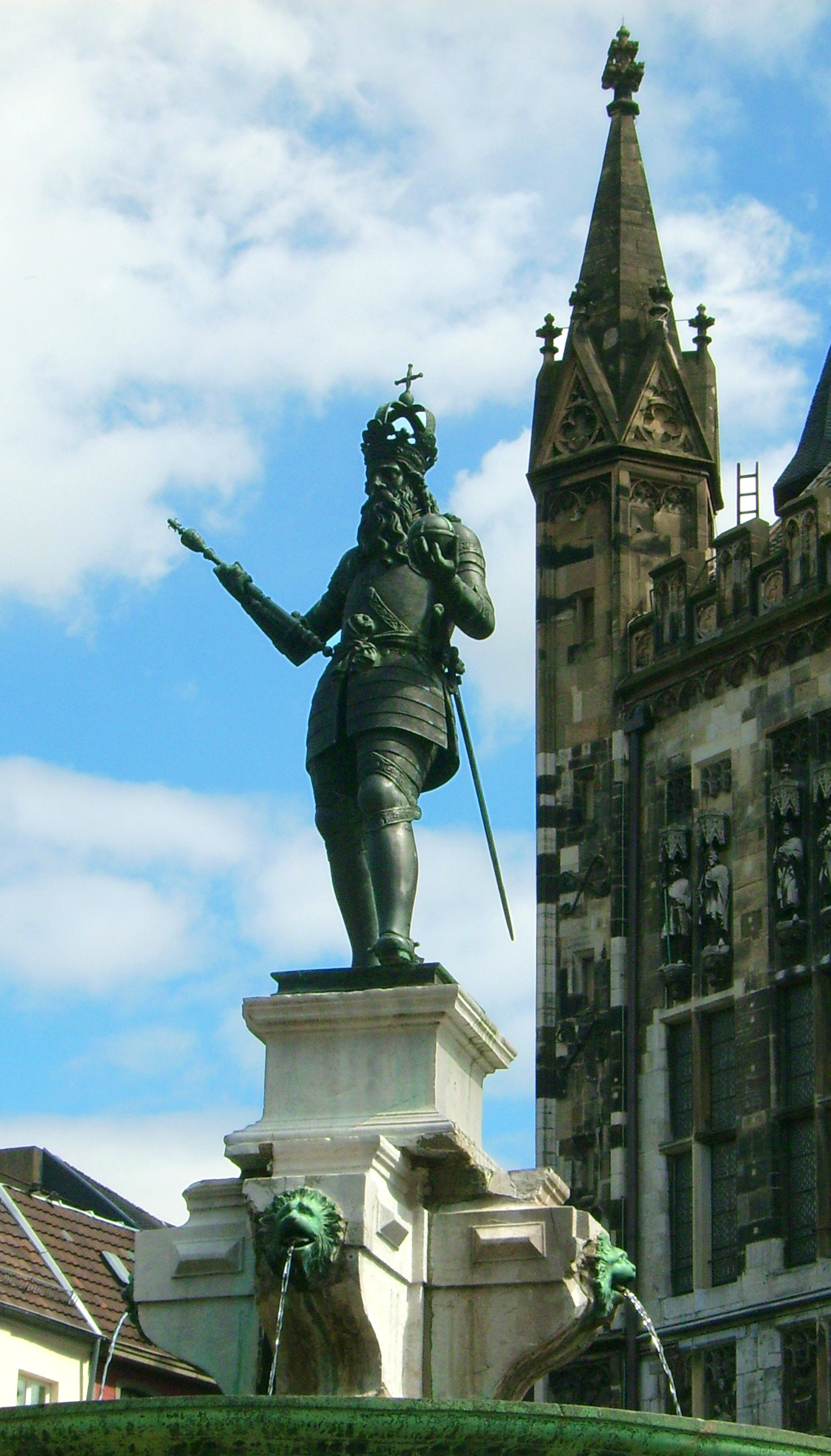
Statue of Charlemagne by Peter and Frans von Trier, 1620, Aachen

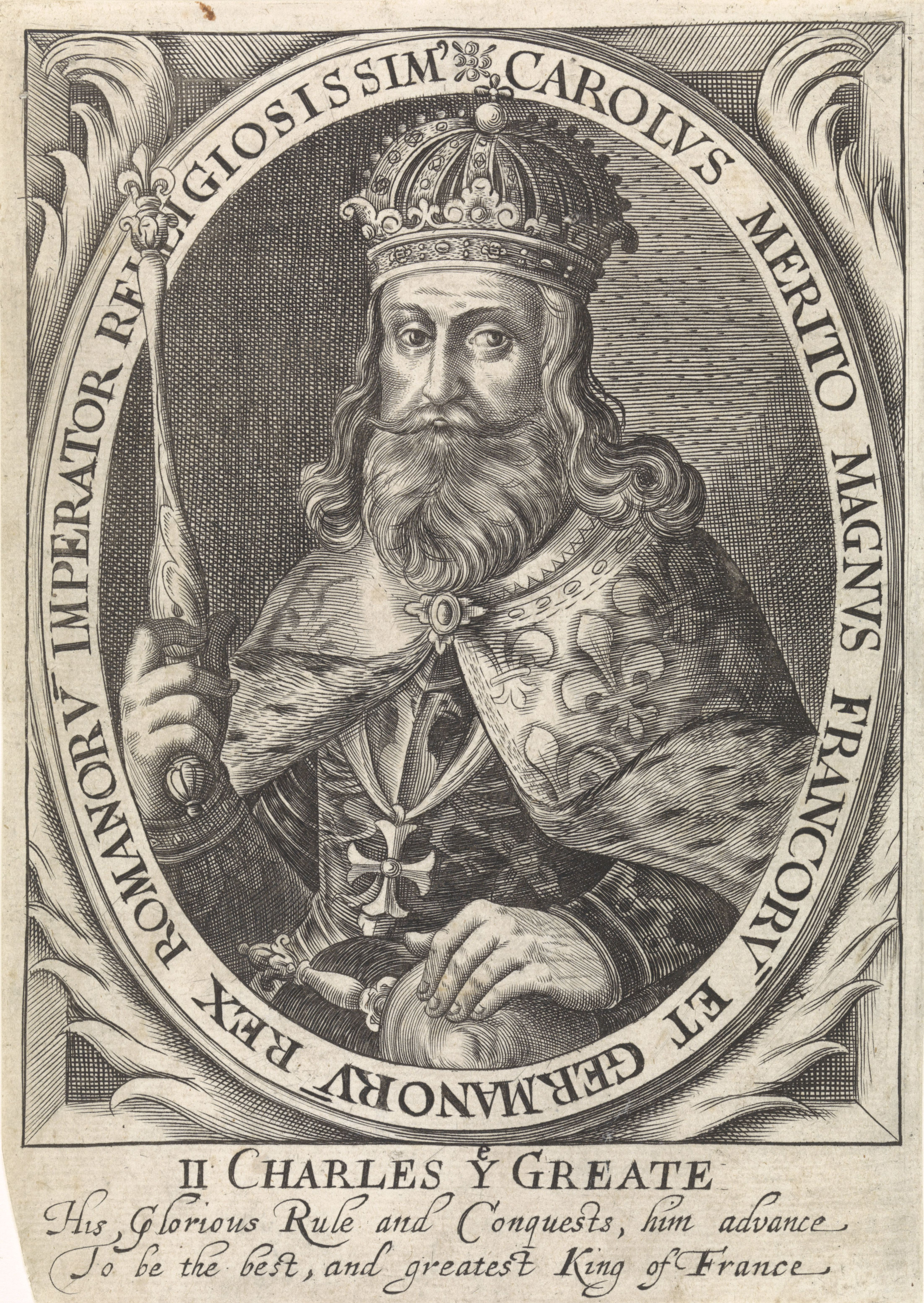
Charlemagne as one of the Nine Worthies by Willem van de Passe, London, 1621–36

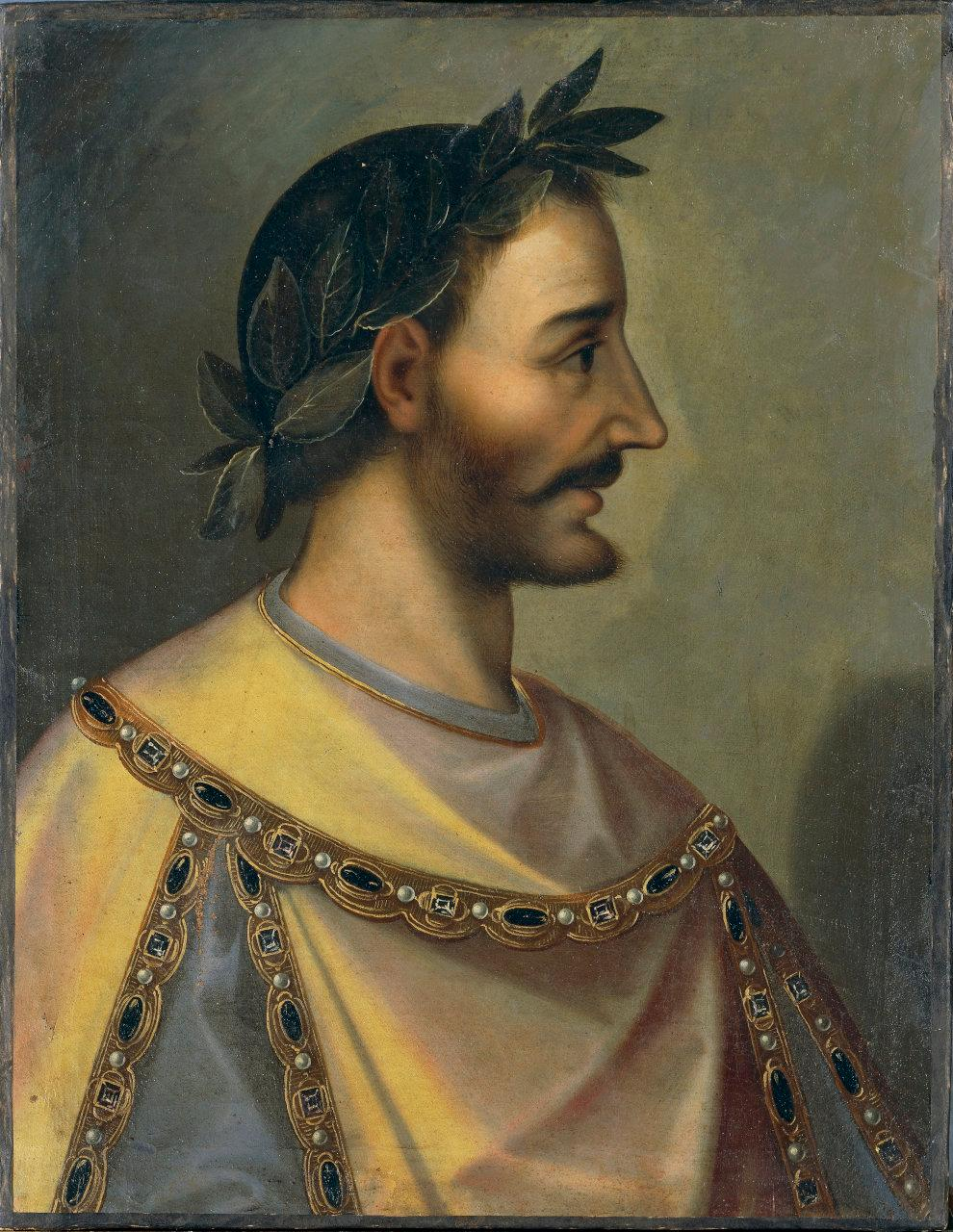
Anonymous portrait of Charlemagne, depicted with a mustache, 1624

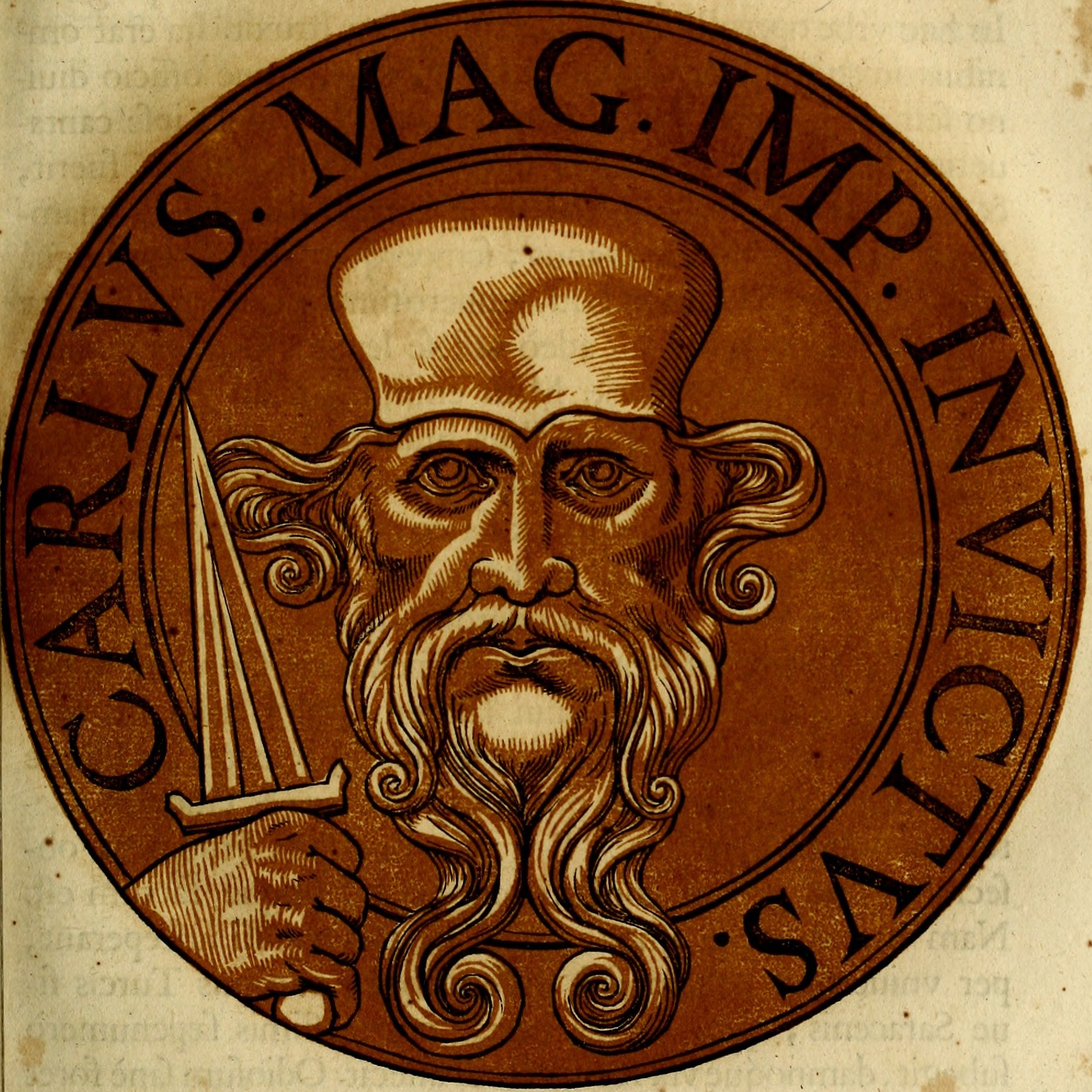
Charlemagne in Icones Imperatorum Romanorum (1645), by Cornelis Galle the Elder after Hendrick Goltzius

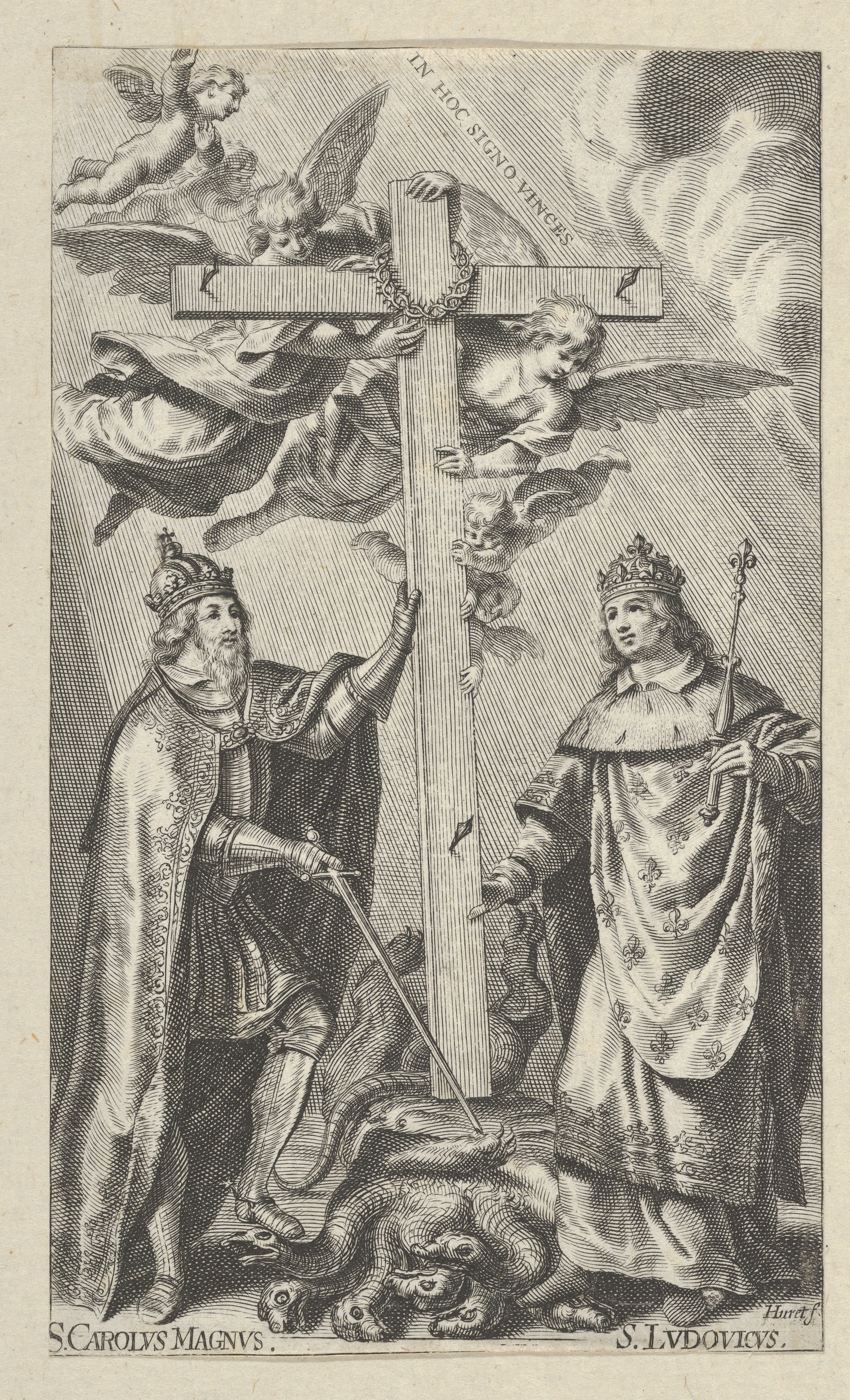
Saint Charlemagne and Saint Louis, by Grégoire Huret, mid-17th century

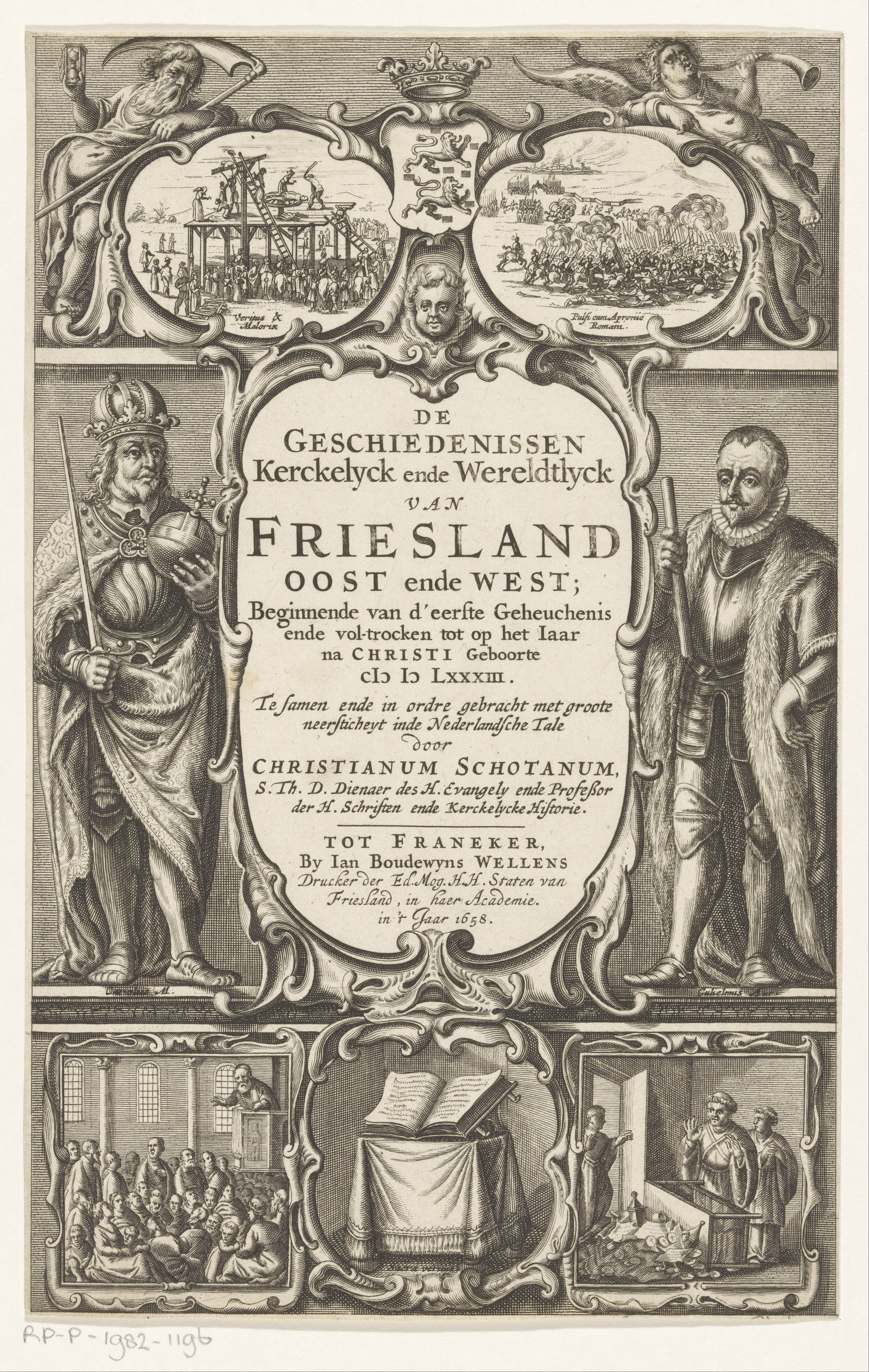
Charlemagne and William the Silent, frontispiece of Christian Schotanus's History of Frisia, 1658

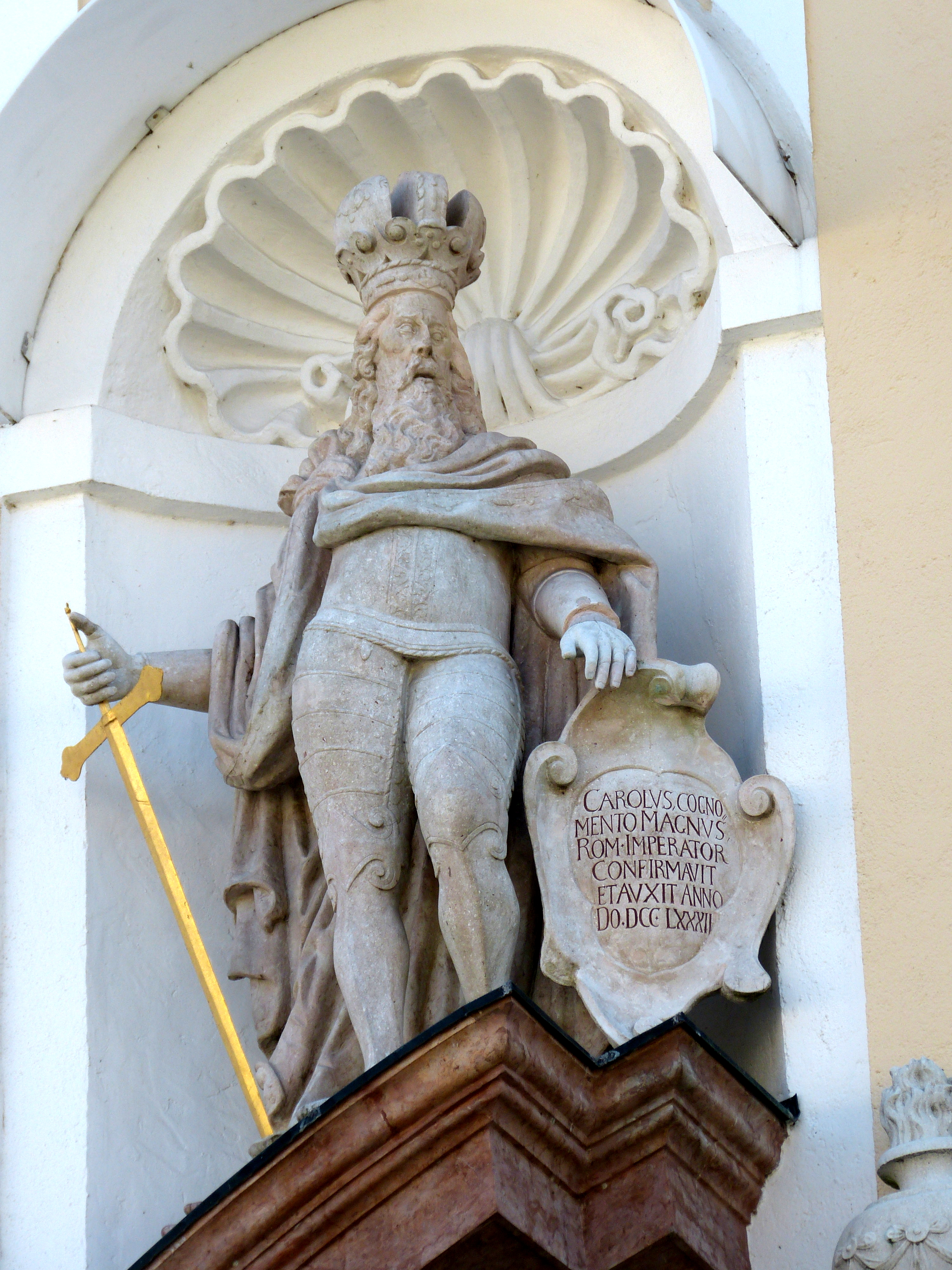
Charlemagne at Kremsmünster Abbey, by Johann Peter Spaz, 1667

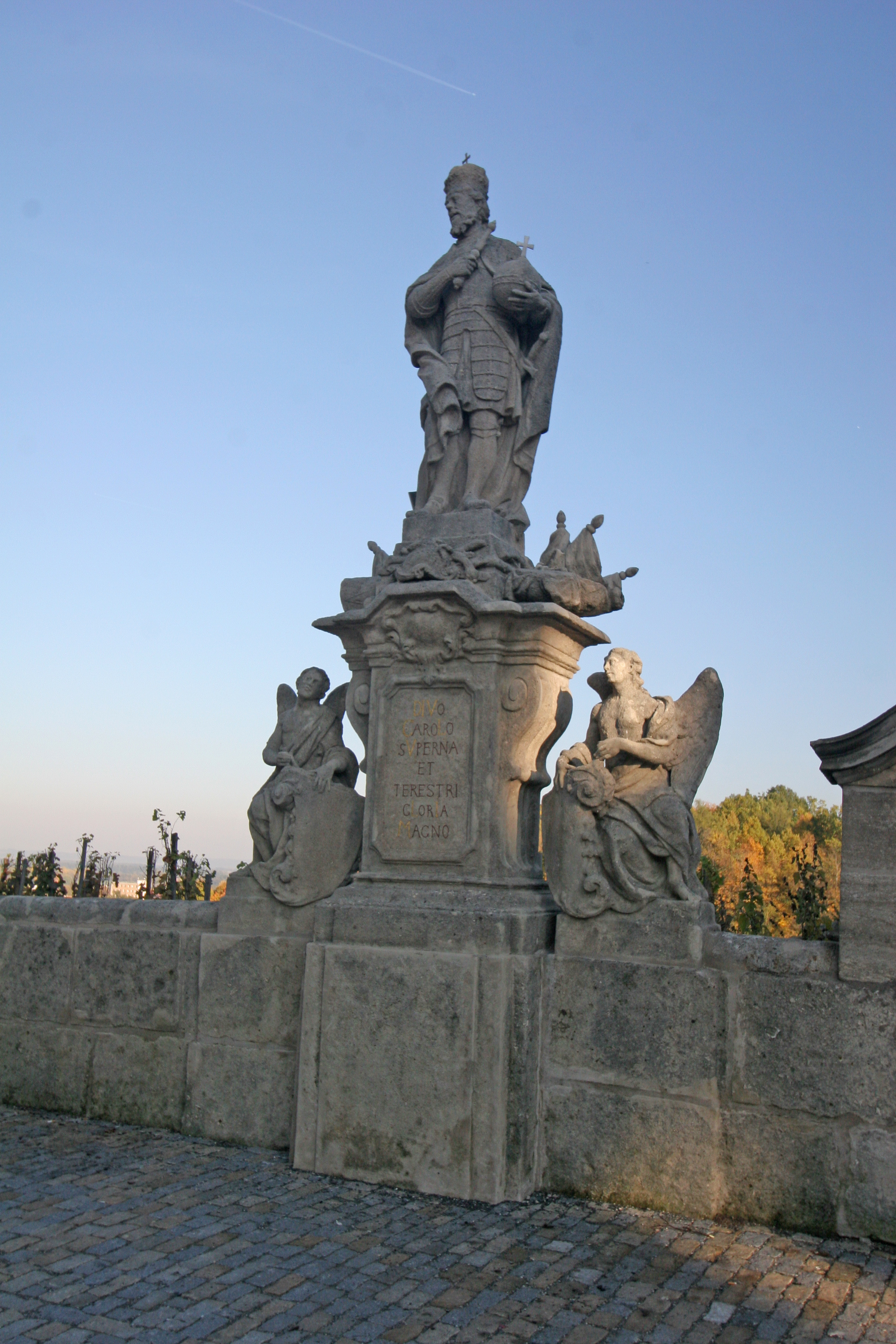
Charlemagne at the Jesuit college of Kutná Hora, remodeling by Giovanni Domenico Orsi de Orsini, 1670s

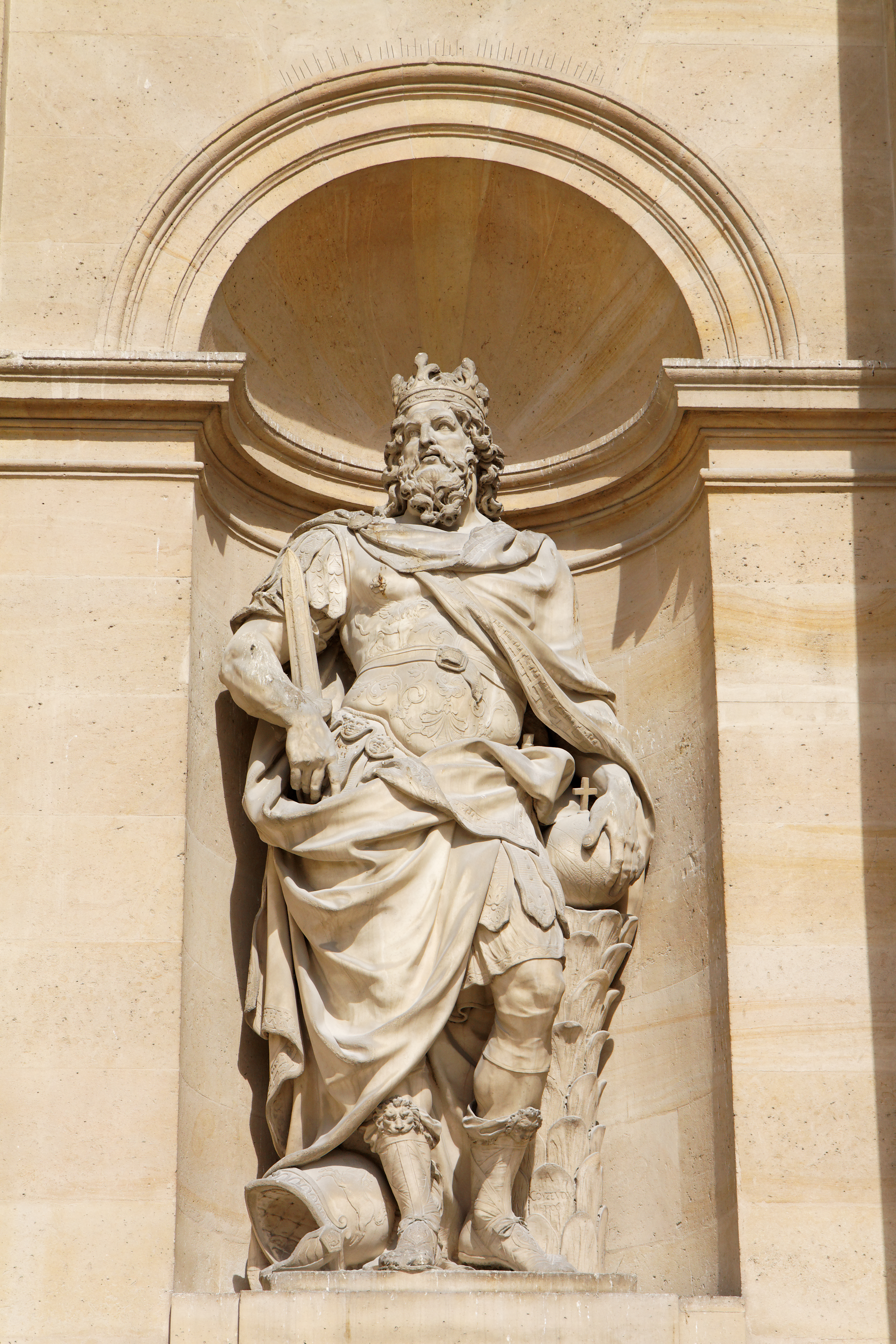
Charlemagne at the Dôme des Invalides in Paris, by Antoine Coysevox, 1706

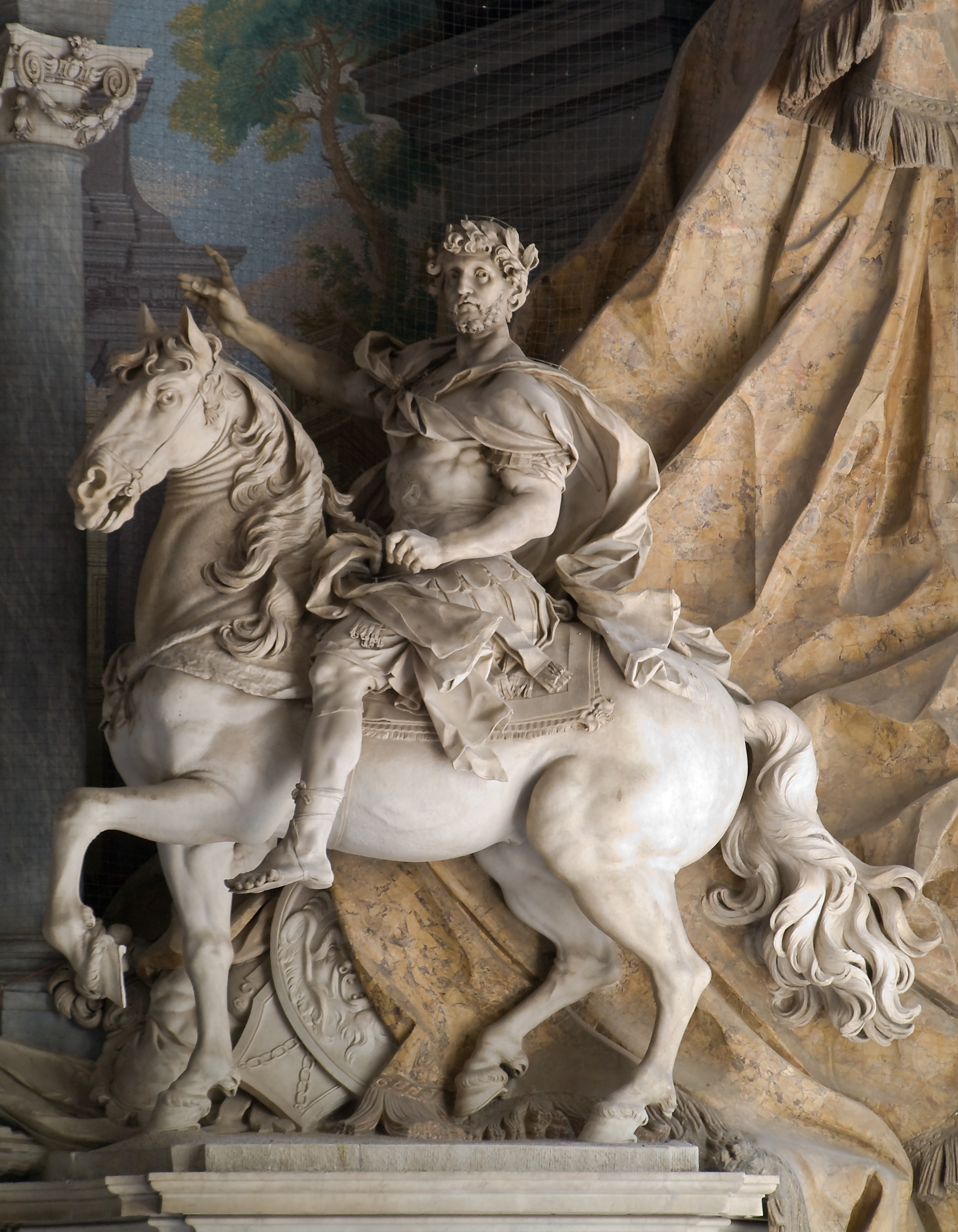
Statue of Charlemagne at St. Peter's Basilica, by Agostino Cornacchini, 1725

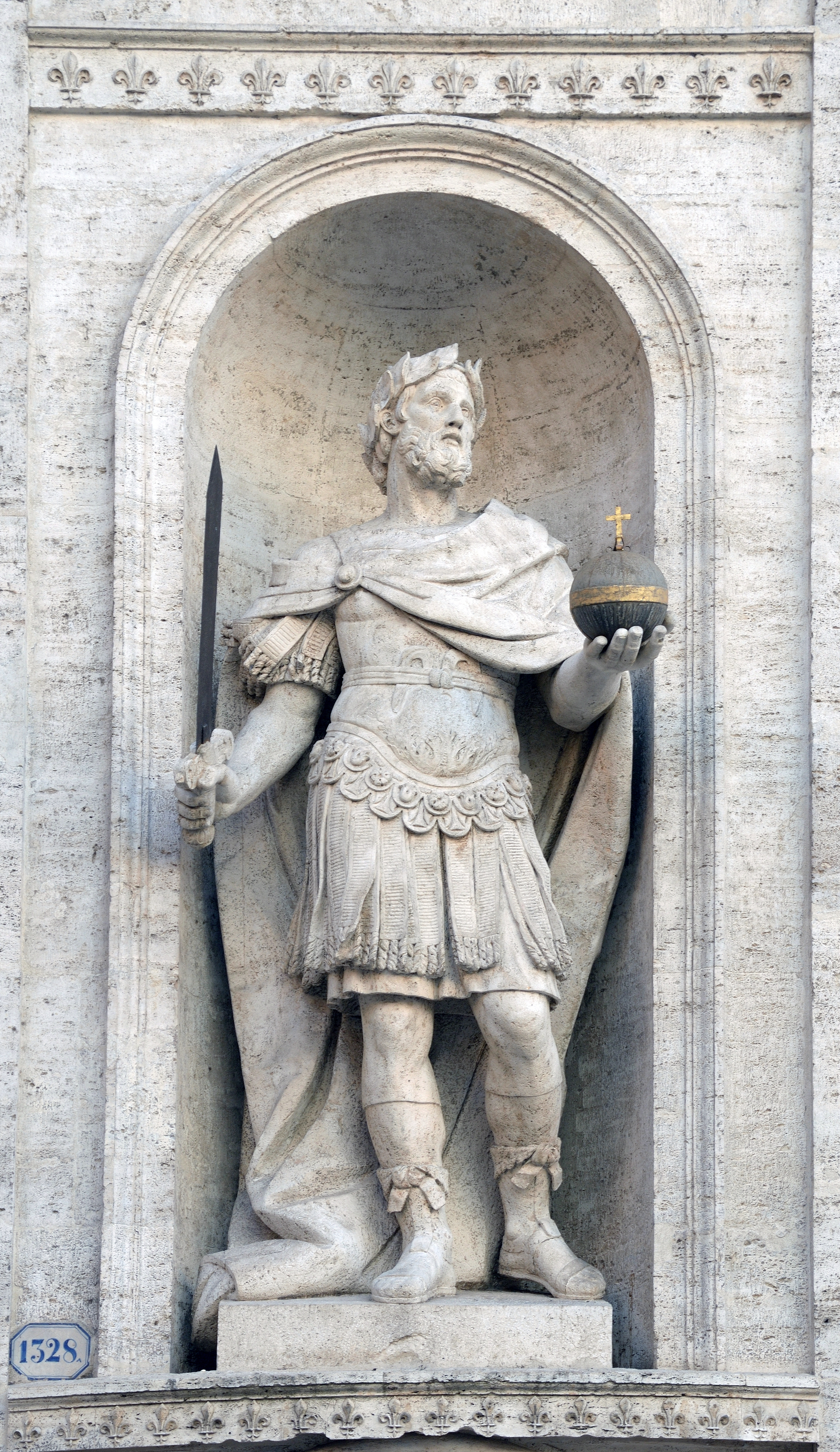
Charlemagne on the façade of San Luigi dei Francesi in Rome, by Pierre de l'Estache, c. 1730

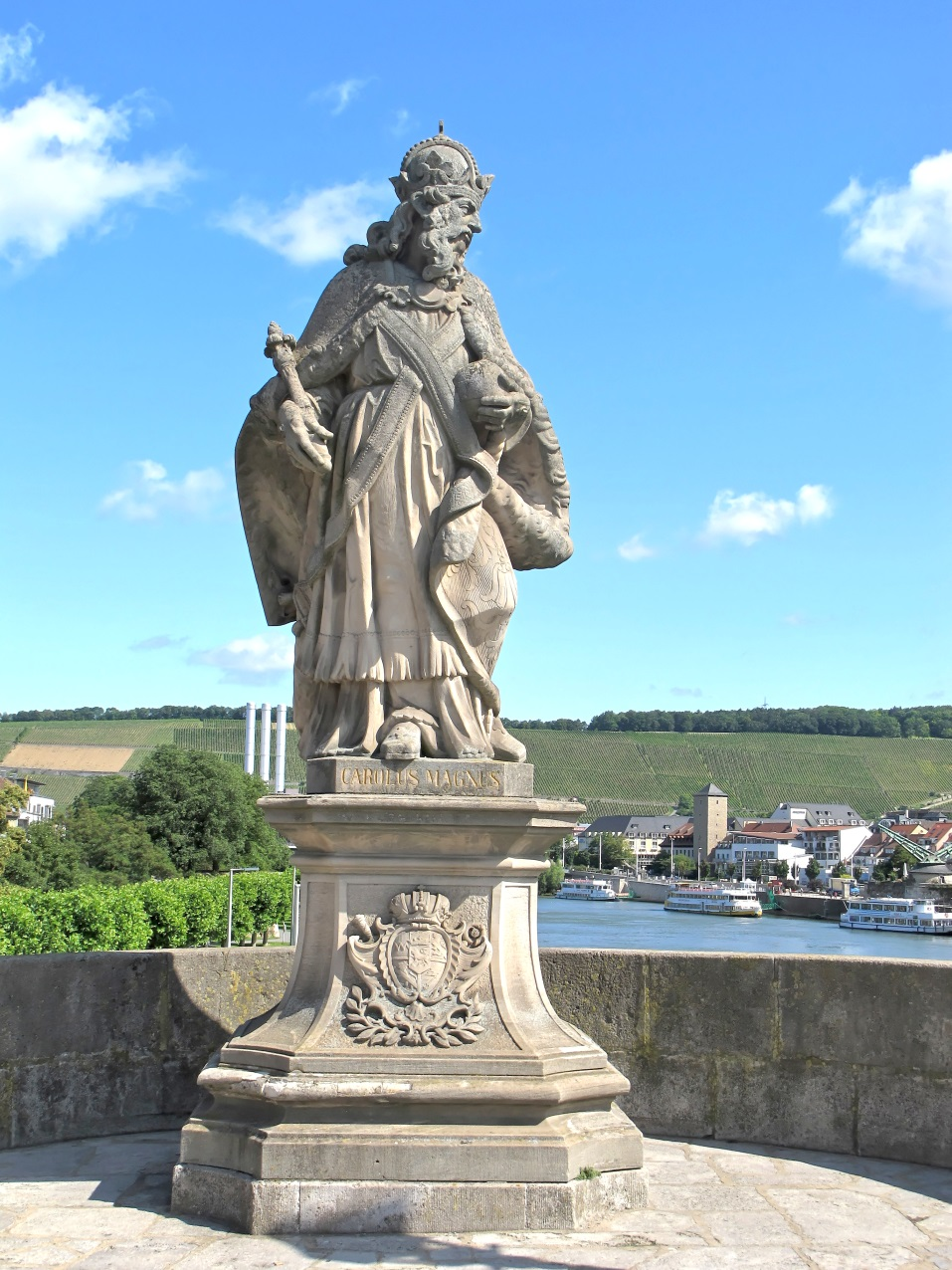
Charlemagne on the Alte Mainbrücke in Würzburg, c. 1730

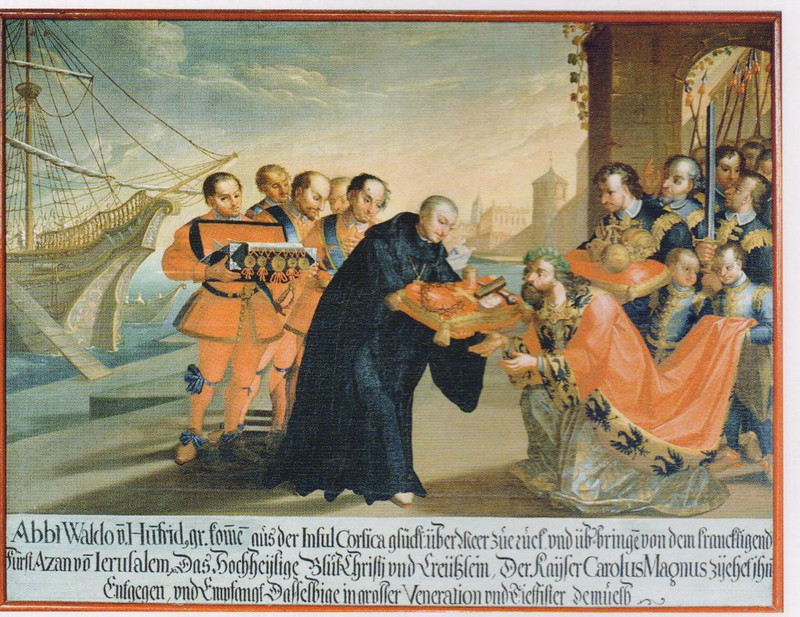
Charlemagne receives relics from Waldo of Reichenau, Münster Reichenau-Mittelzell, 18th century

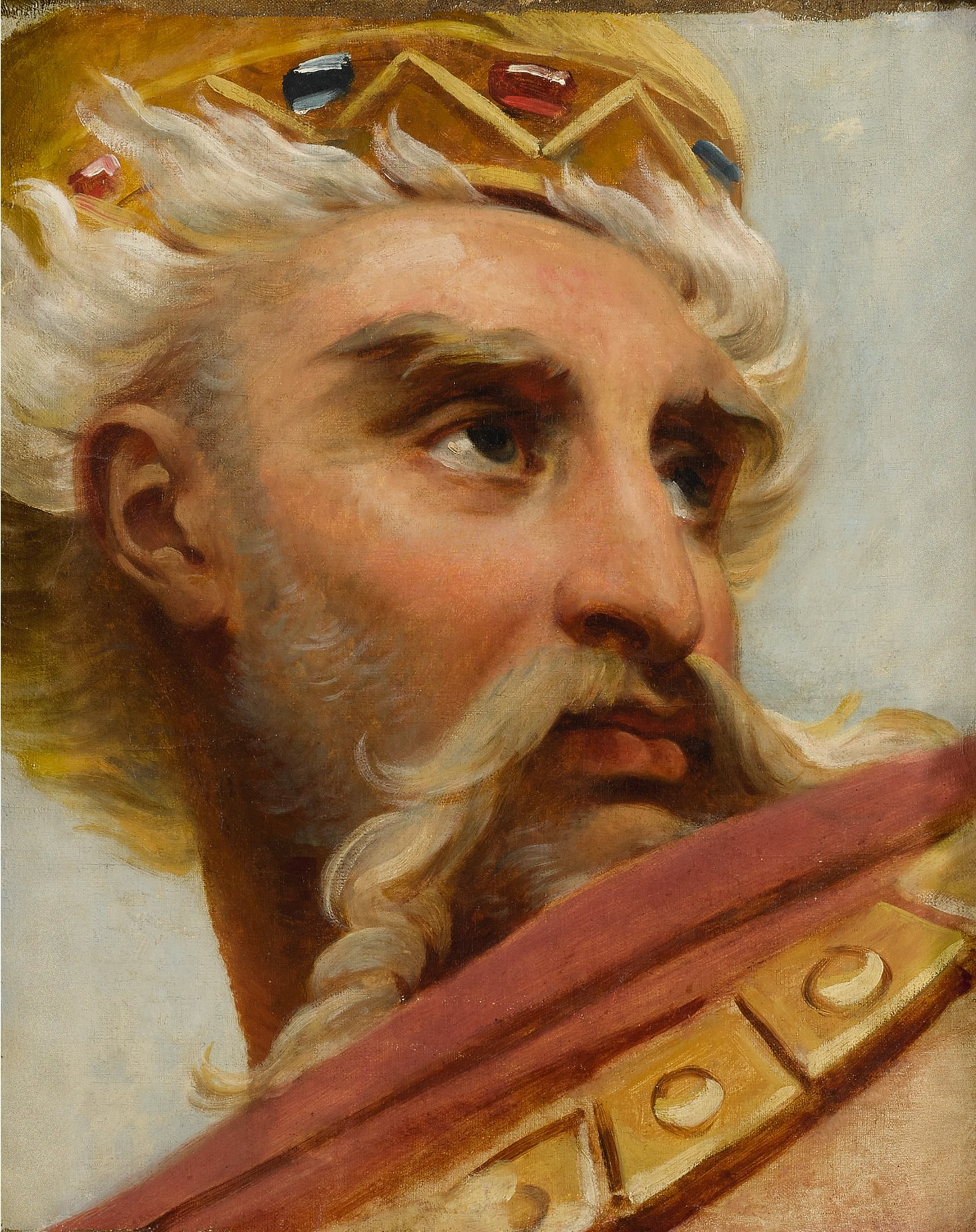
Study of Charlemagne's head for the Panthéon frescoes, by Antoine-Jean Gros, c. 1812

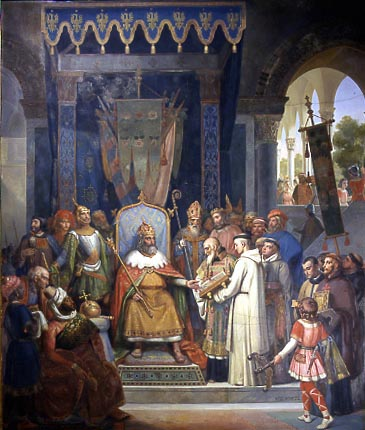
Charlemagne and Alcuin, by Jean-Victor Schnetz, 1830, Louvre

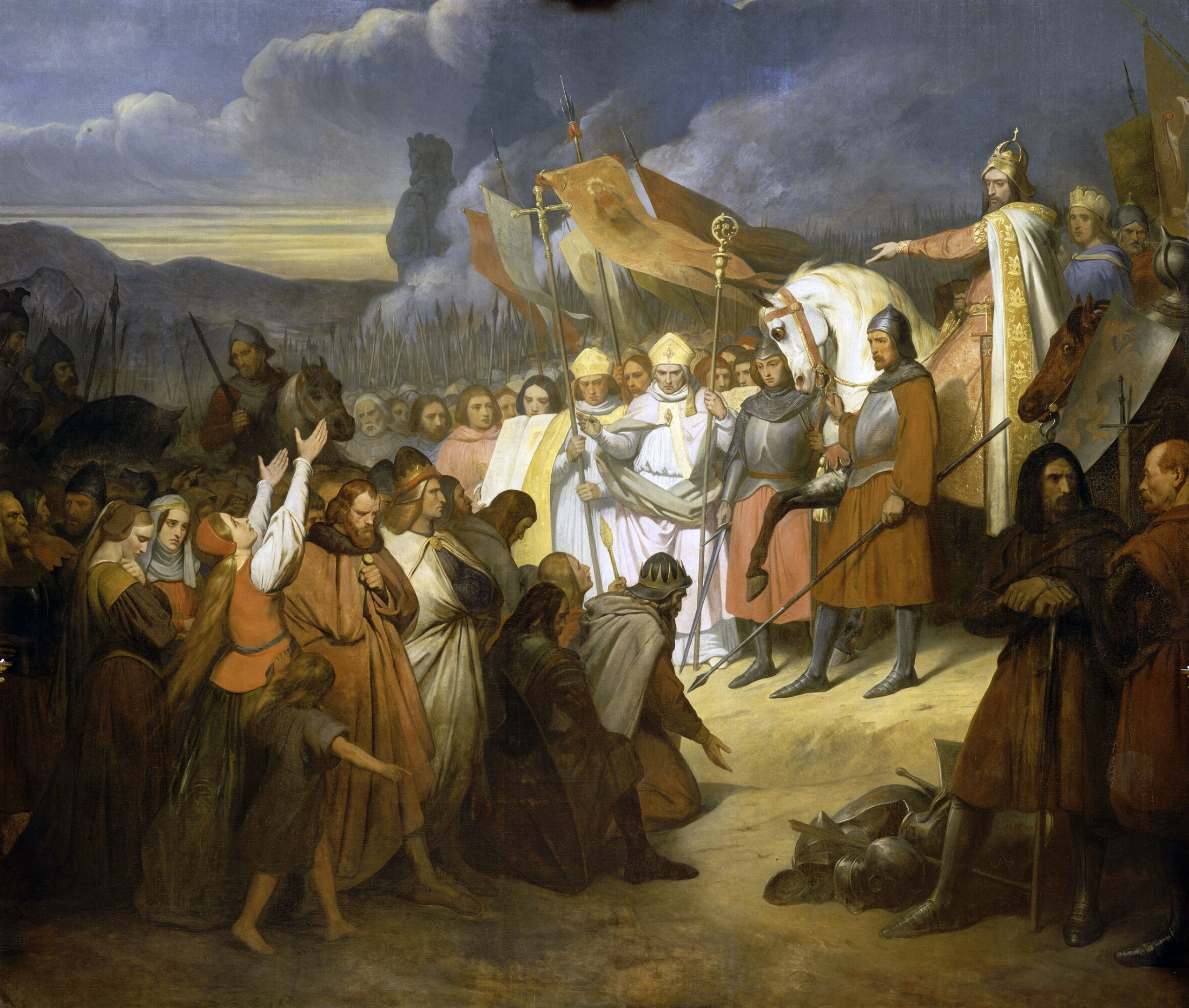
Charlemagne submitting Widukind at Paderborn, Galerie des Batailles of the Palace of Versailles, by Ary Scheffer, 1835

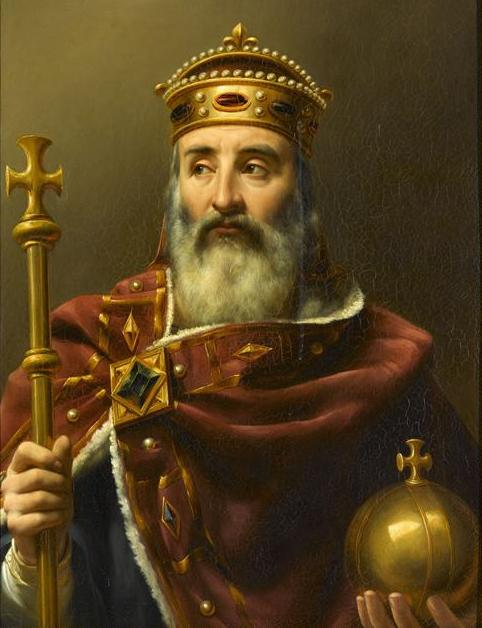
Charlemagne by Louis-Félix Amiel, late 1830s, Musée de l'Histoire de France (Versailles)

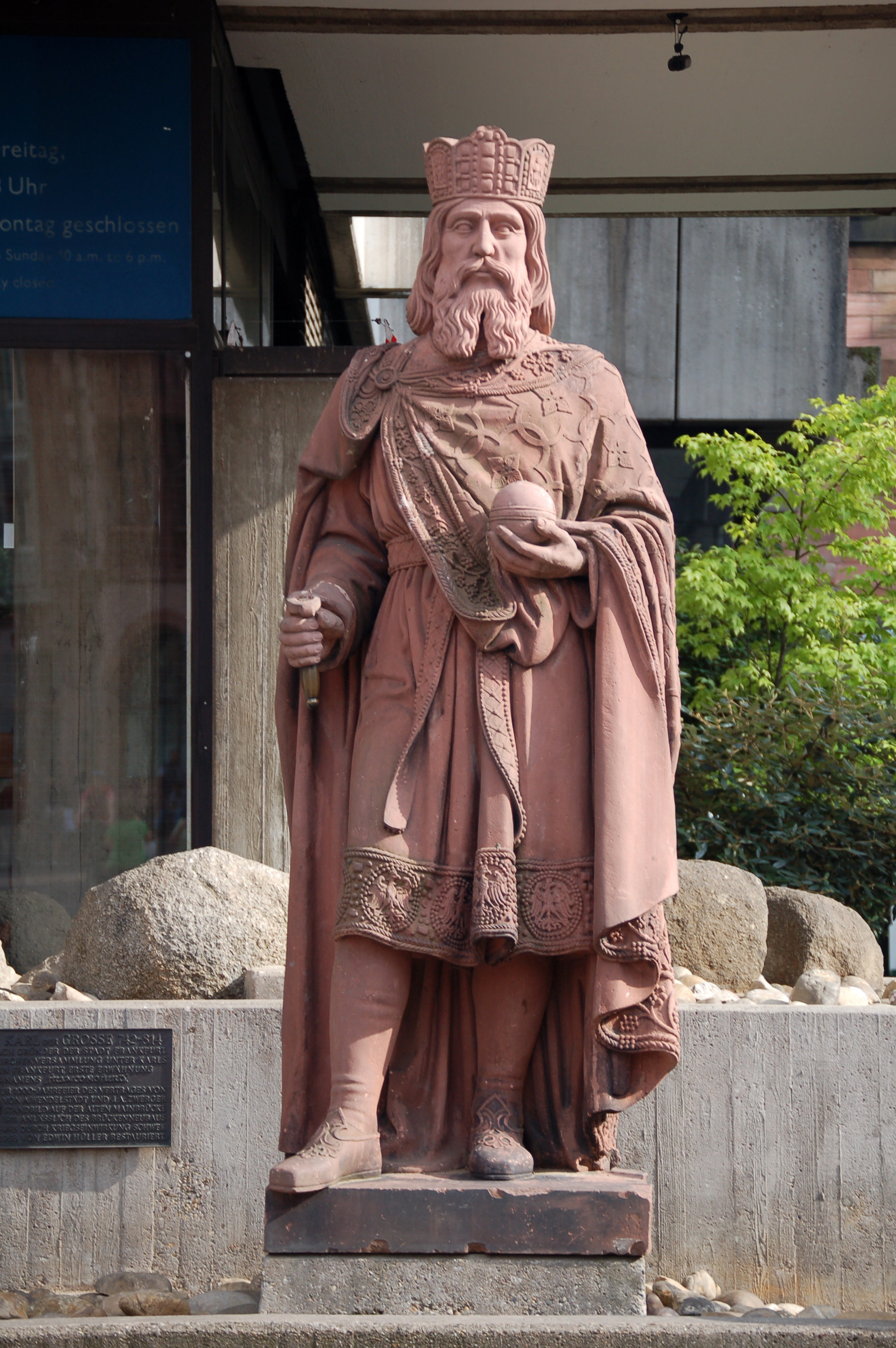
Statue of Charlemagne by Johann Nepomuk Zwerger, 1843, Historical Museum, Frankfurt

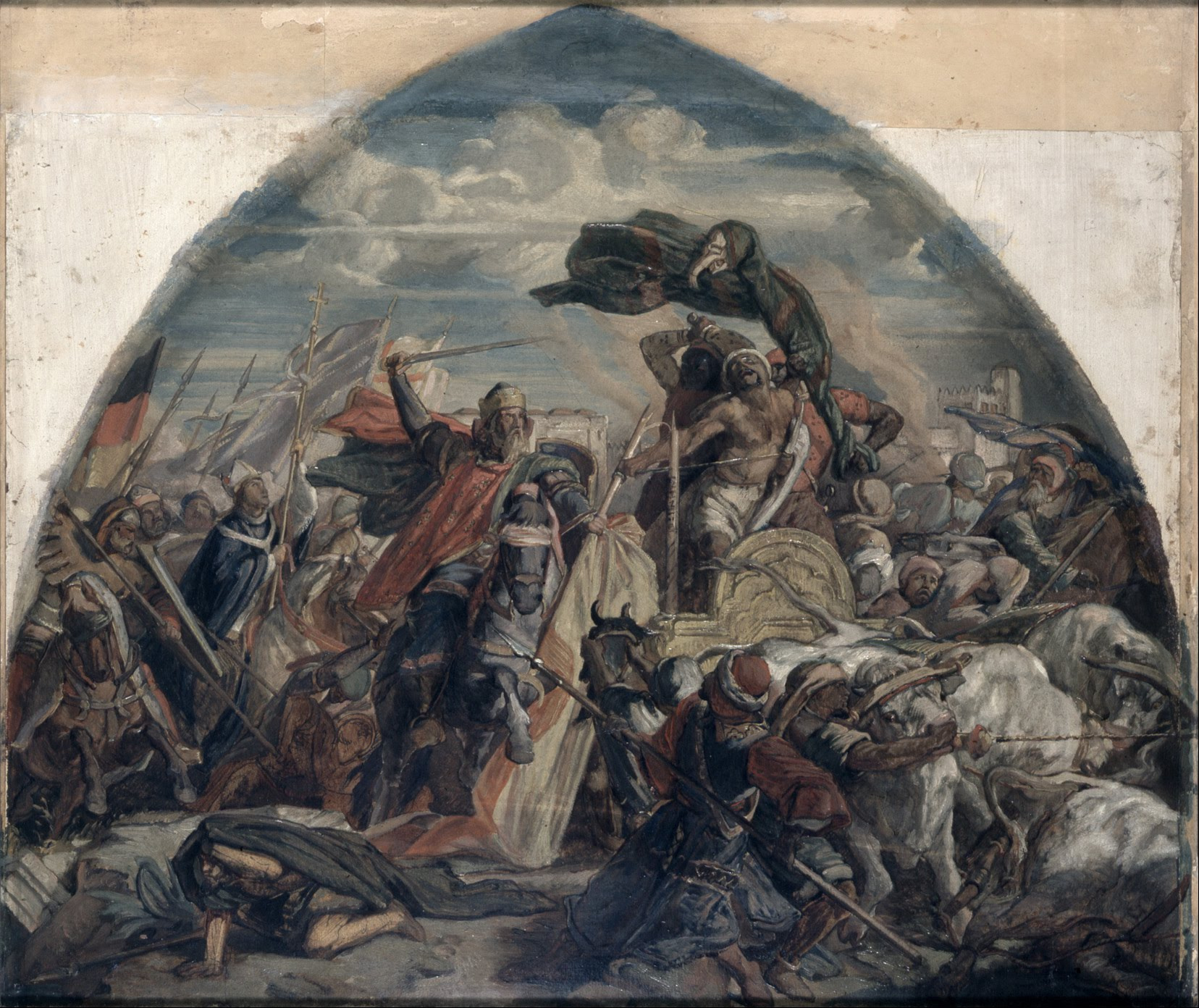
Charlemagne fighting the Saracens, by Alfred Rethel, 1849, Museum Kunstpalast in Düsseldorf

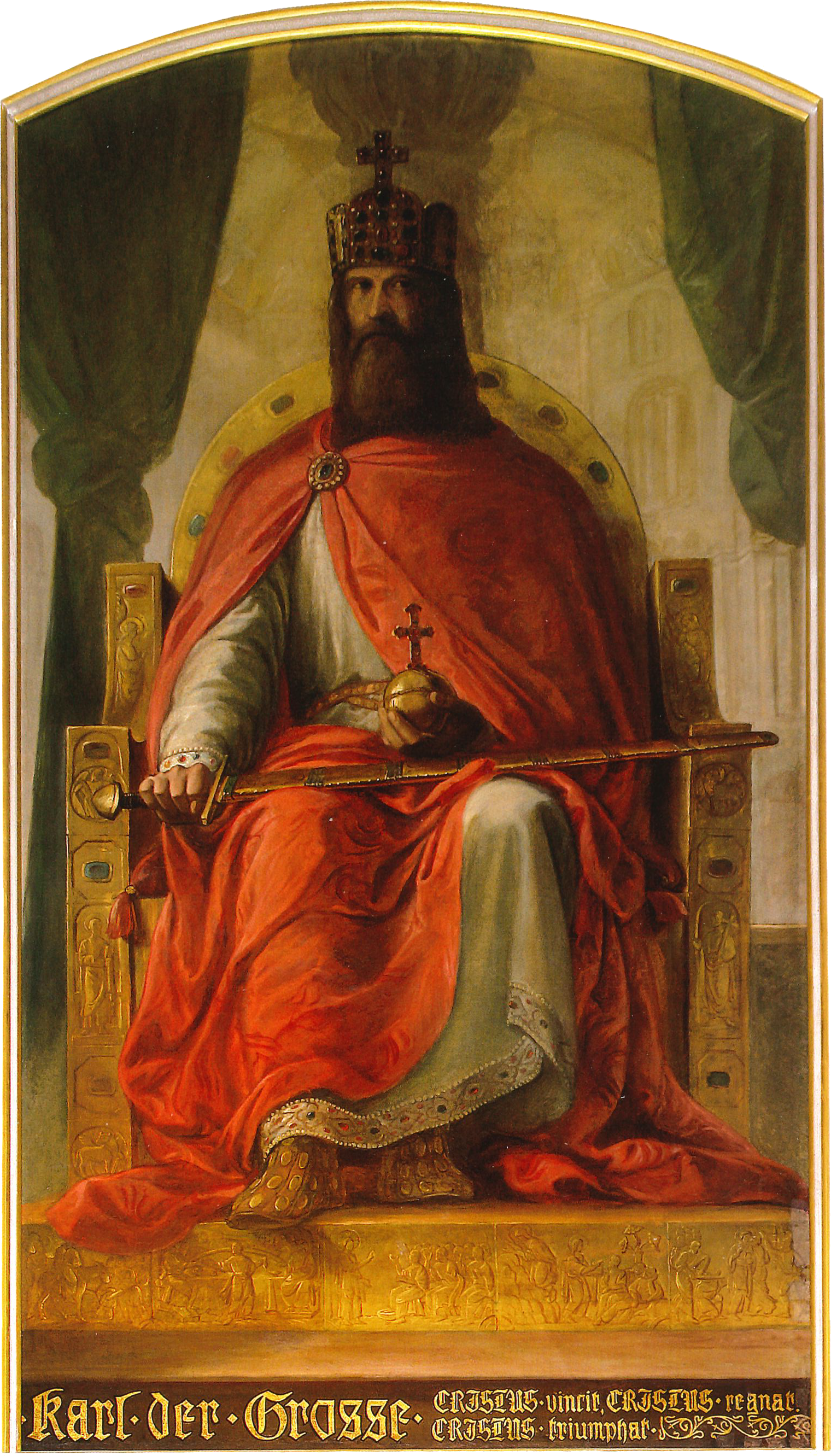
Charlemagne in the Kaisersaal of the Römer in Frankfurt, by Philipp Veit, 1852

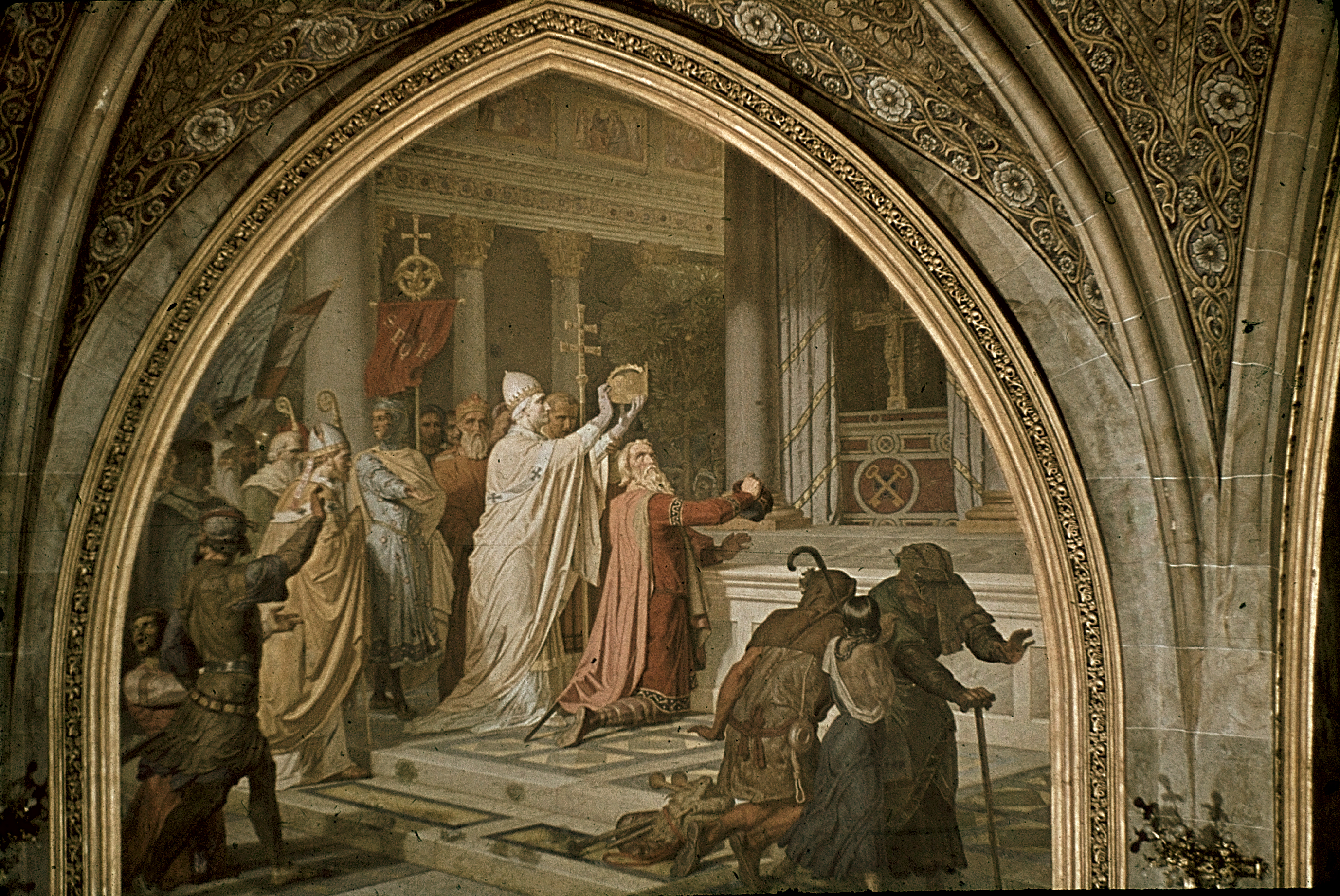
Coronation of Charlemagne at Aachen Town Hall, by Joseph Kehren, 1860

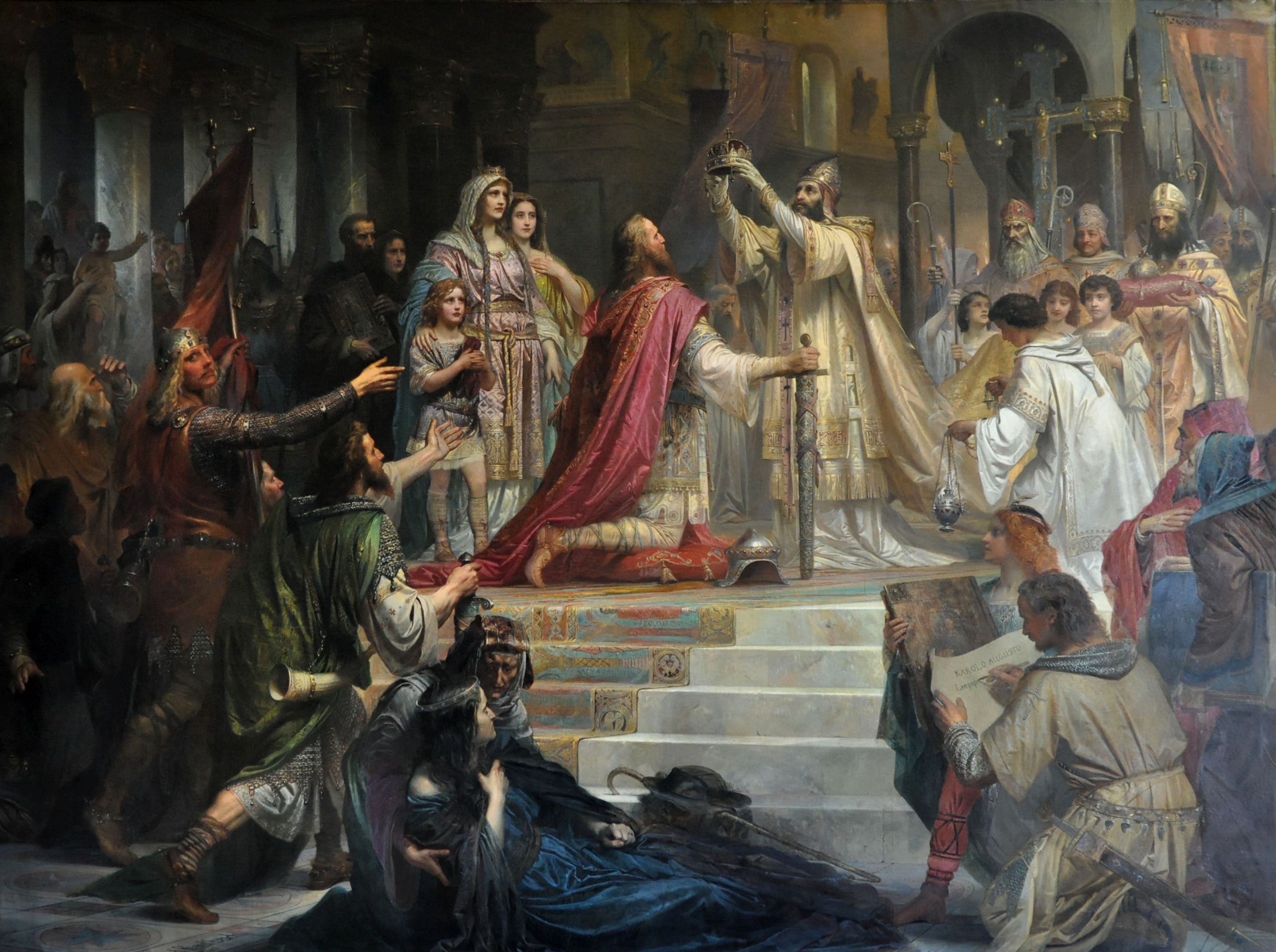
Coronation of Charlemagne at the Maximilianeum in Munich, by Friedrich Kaulbach, 1861

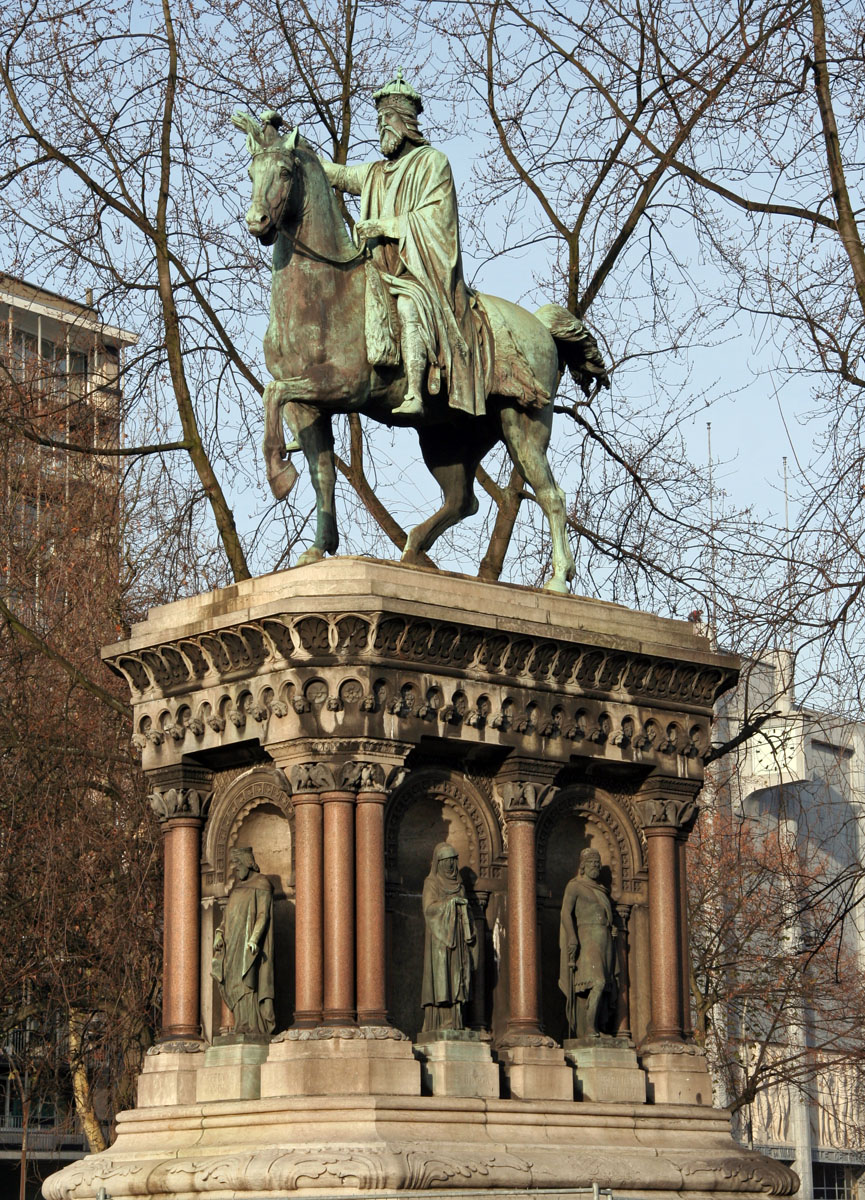
Statue of Charlemagne in Liège, by Louis Jehotte, 1867

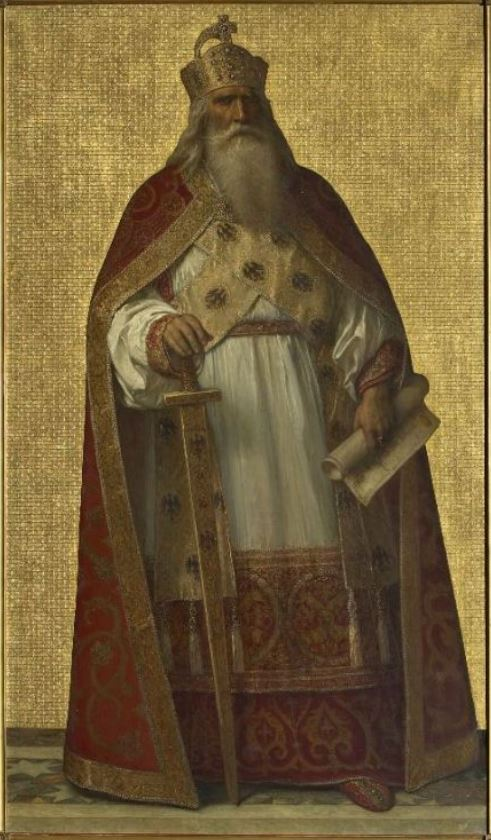
Charlemagne in the Belgian Senate Chamber, by Louis Gallait, 1870s

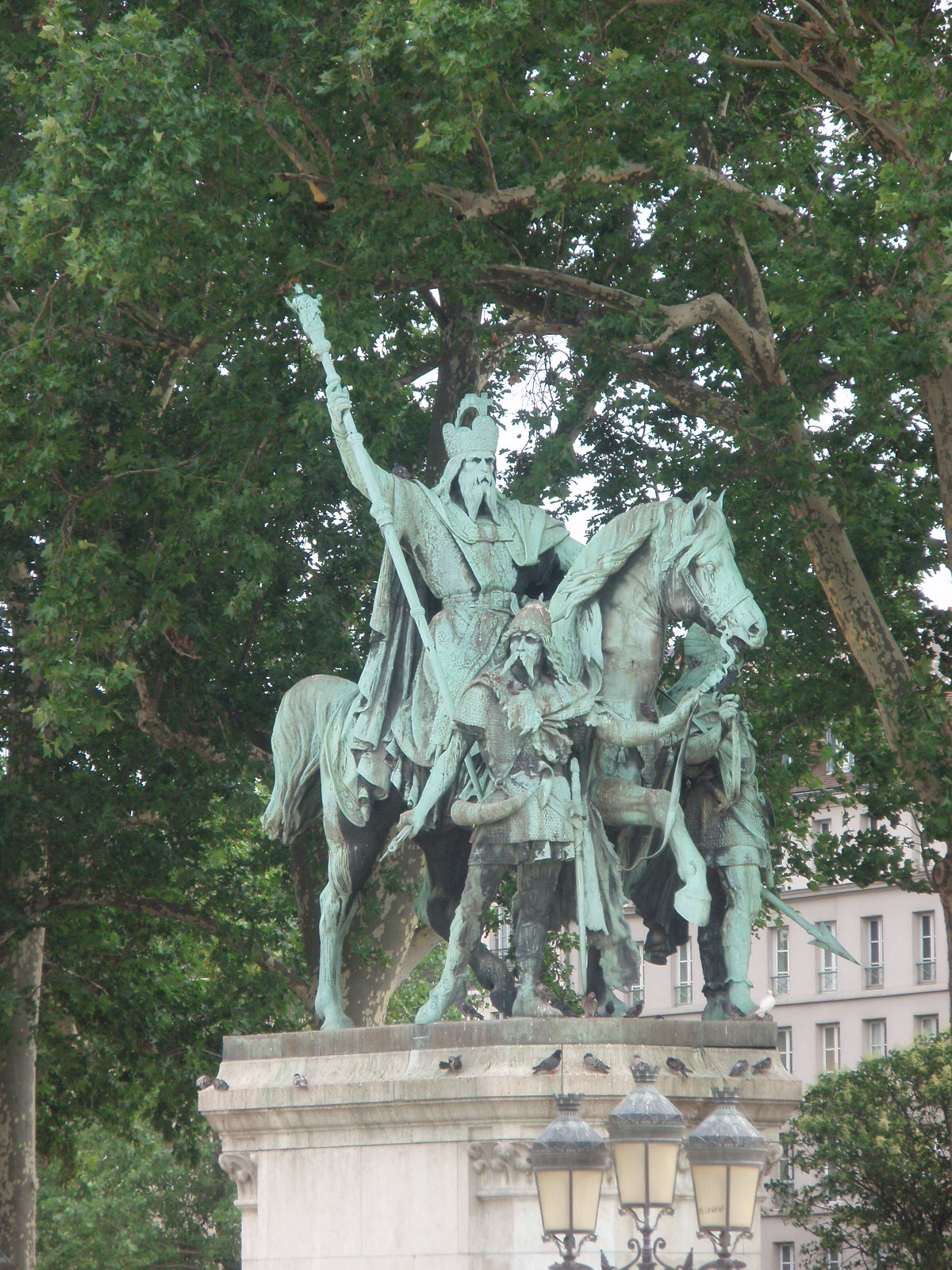
Charlemagne et ses Leudes in Paris, by Louis and Charles Rochet, 1878

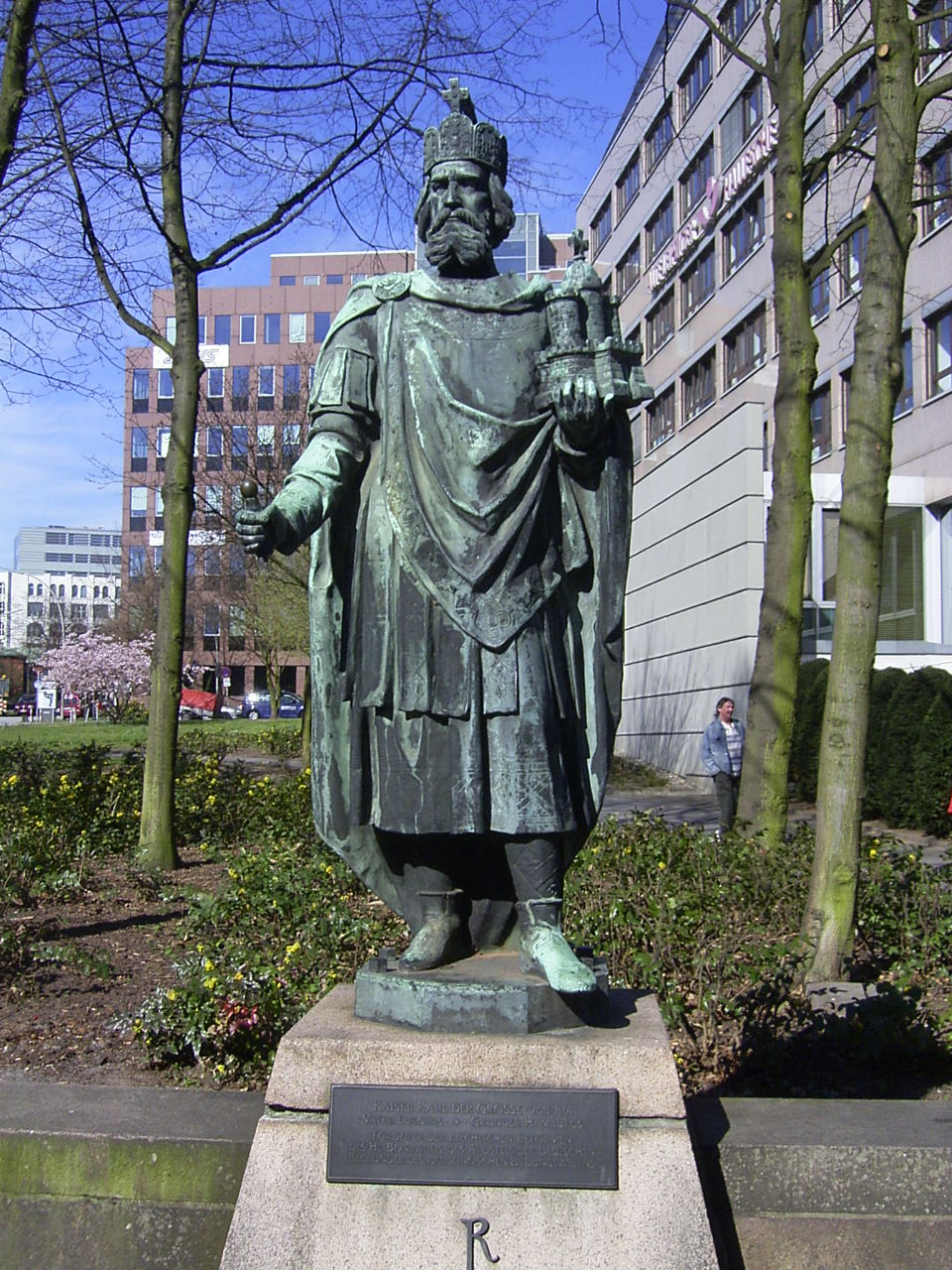
Statue of Charlemagne in Hamburg, by Engelbert Peiffer, 1889

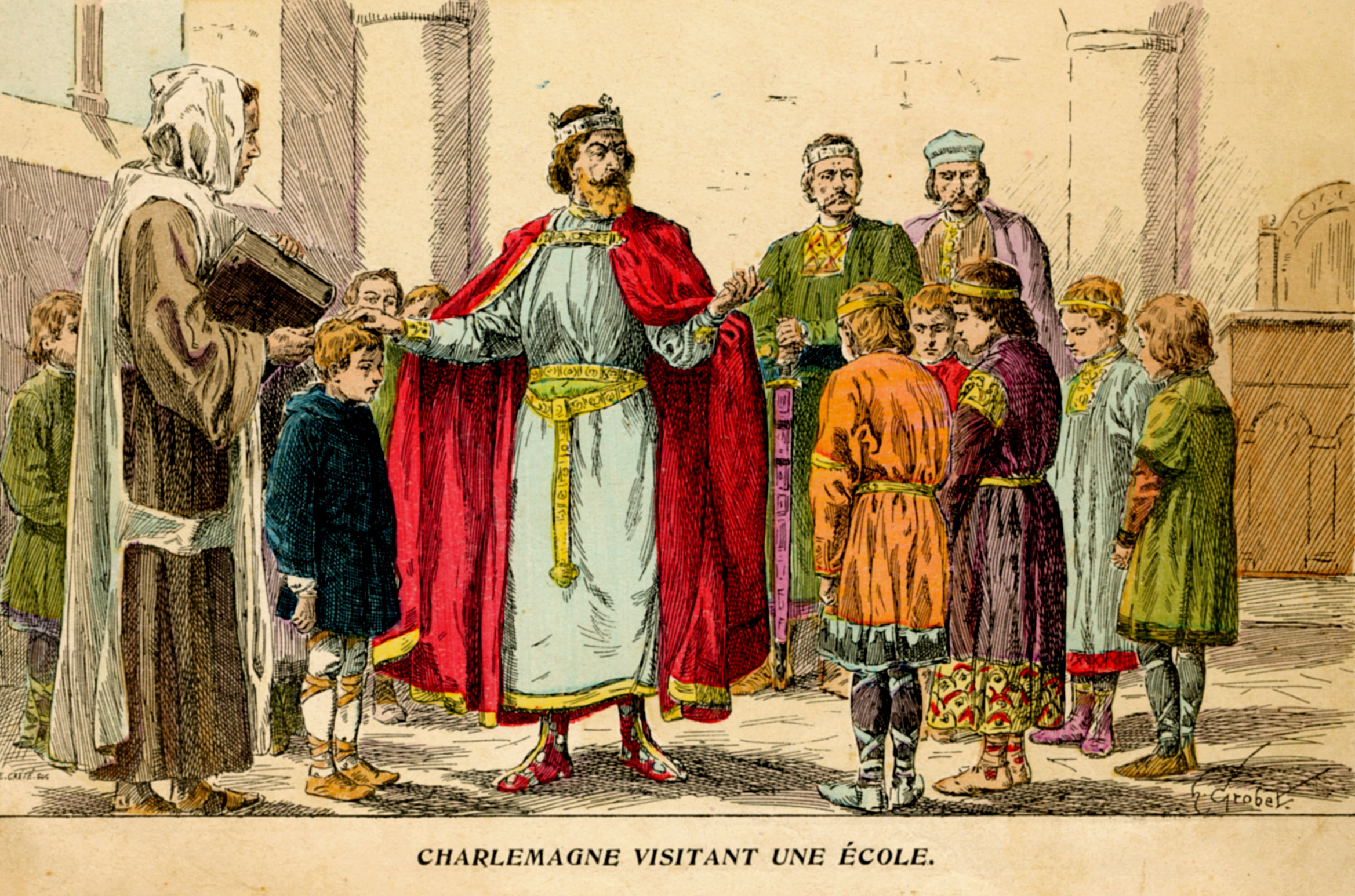
"Charlemagne visits a school", French schoolbook illustration by E. Creté after Henri Grobet, 1902

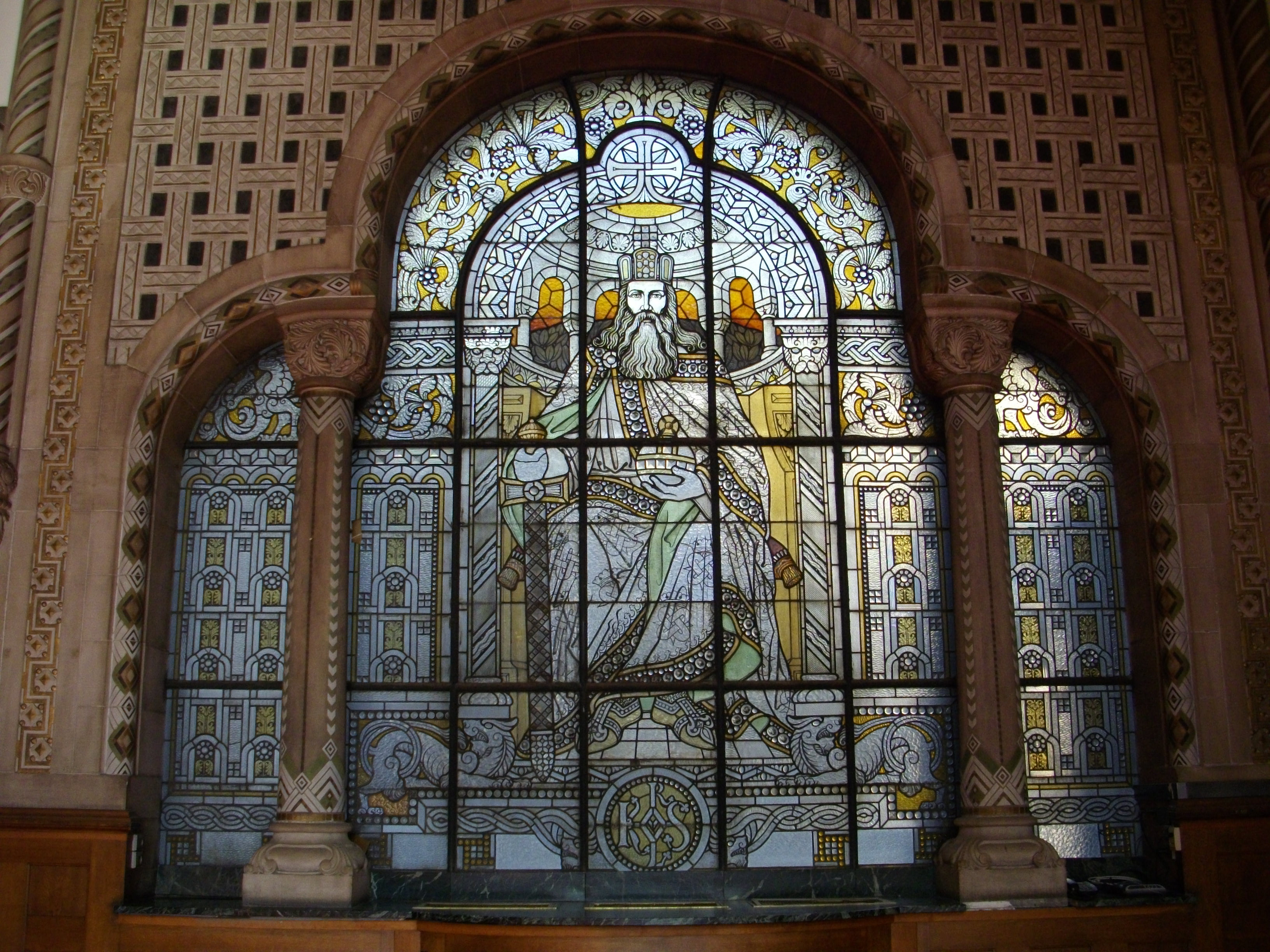
Charlemagne Window in Metz-Ville station, 1908

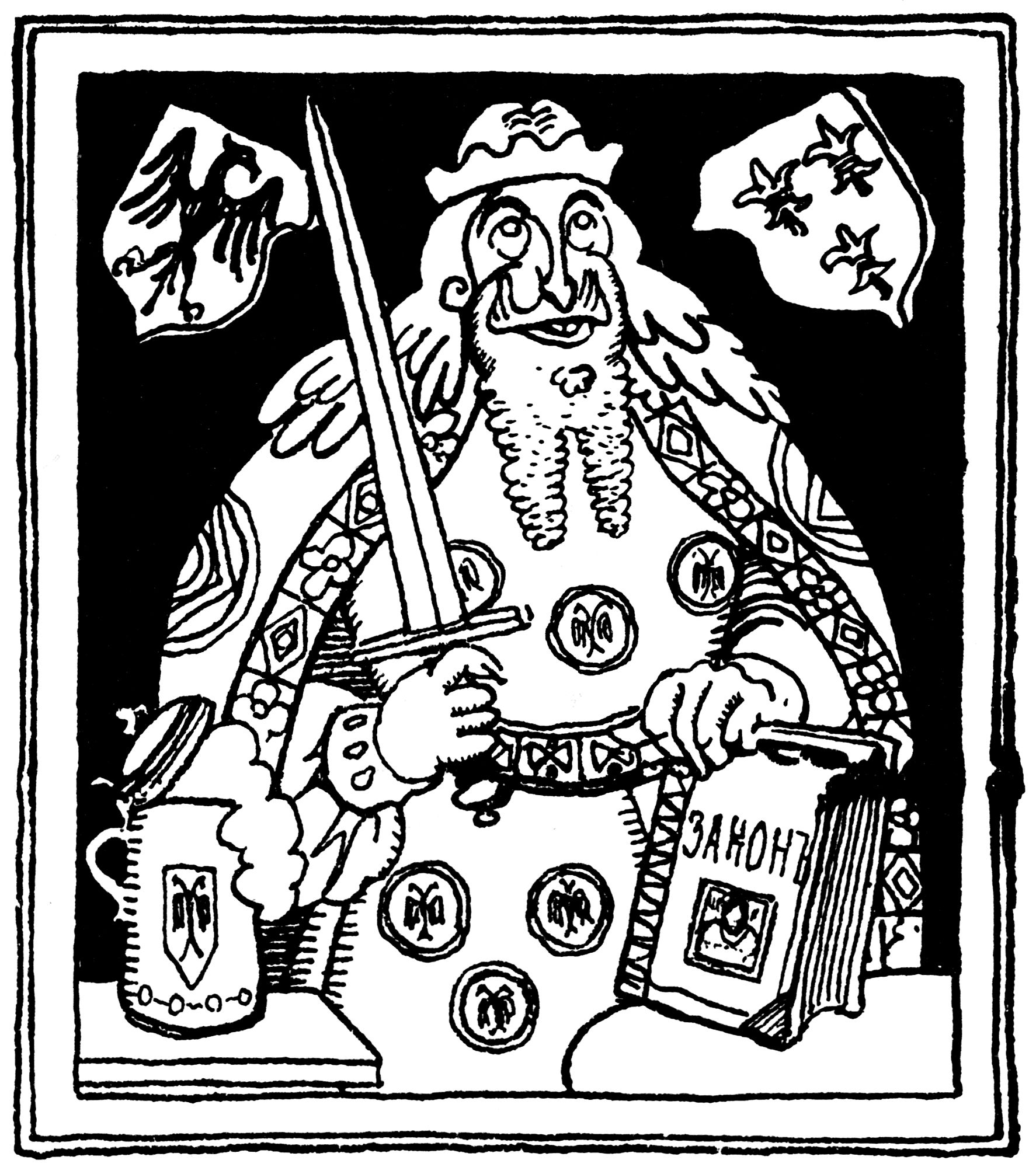
Charlemagne by Alexei Radakov, 1911

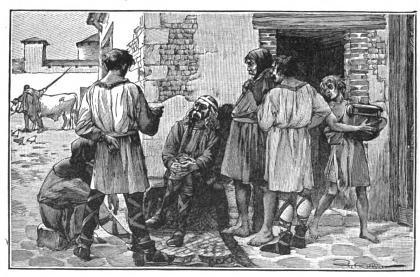
Charlemagne and his farmers, illustration of Ernest Lavisse's Histoire de France, 1913

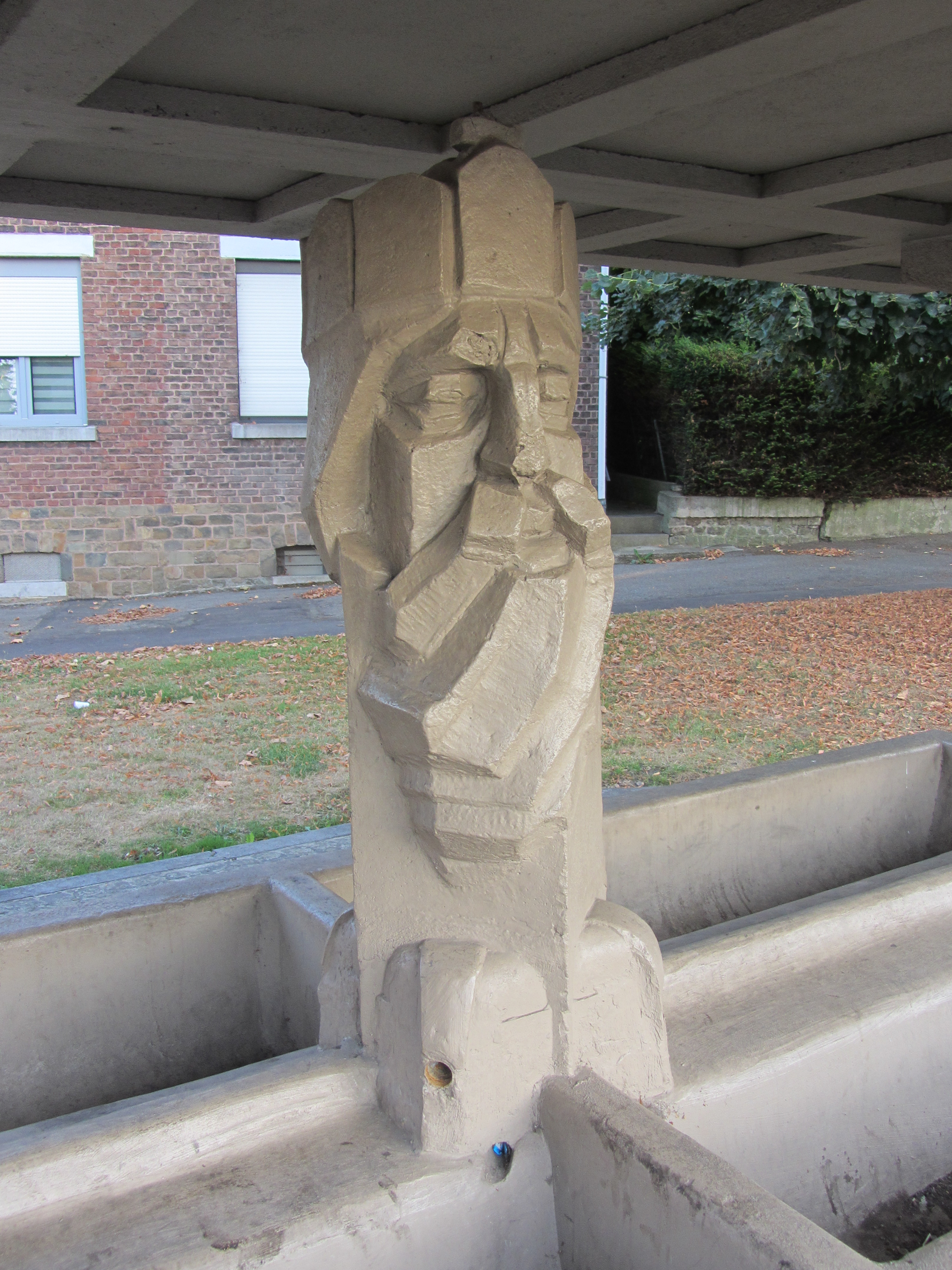
Charlemagne in the lavoir of Jupille-sur-Meuse, by Oscar Berchmans, 1924

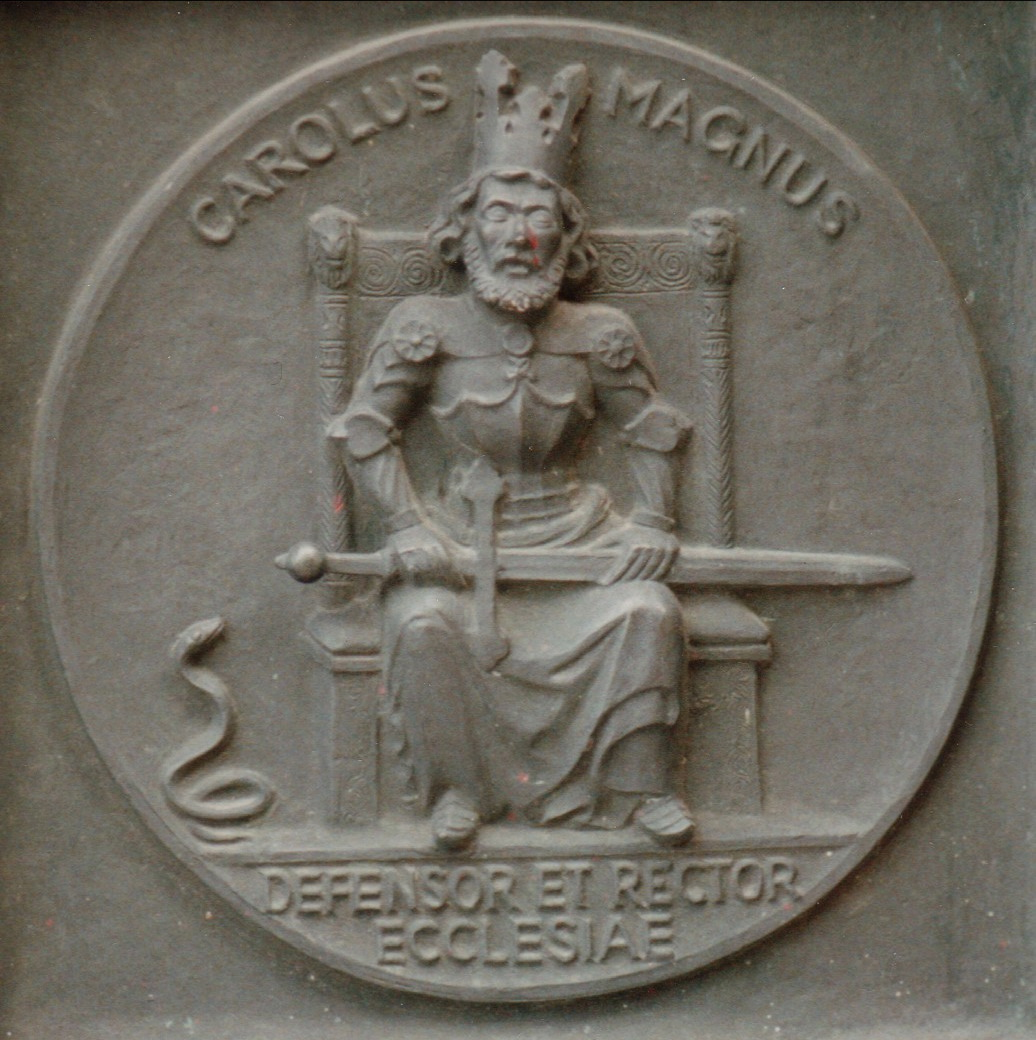
Charlemagne on the bronze door of the Grossmünster at Zürich, by Otto Münch, 1935

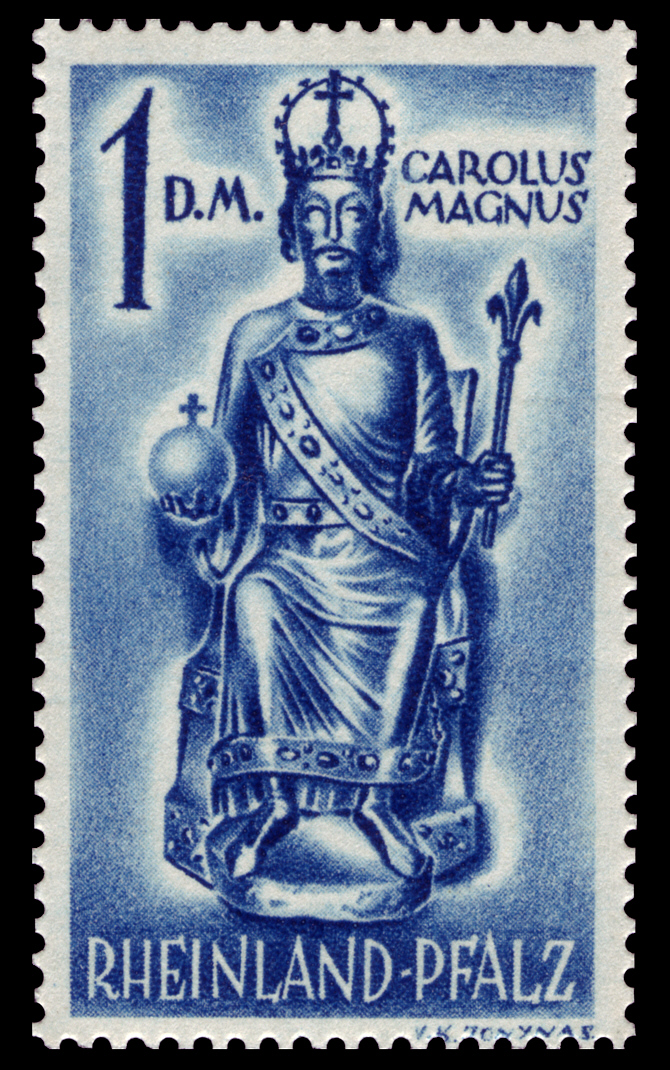
Charlemagne stamp, Germany, 1948

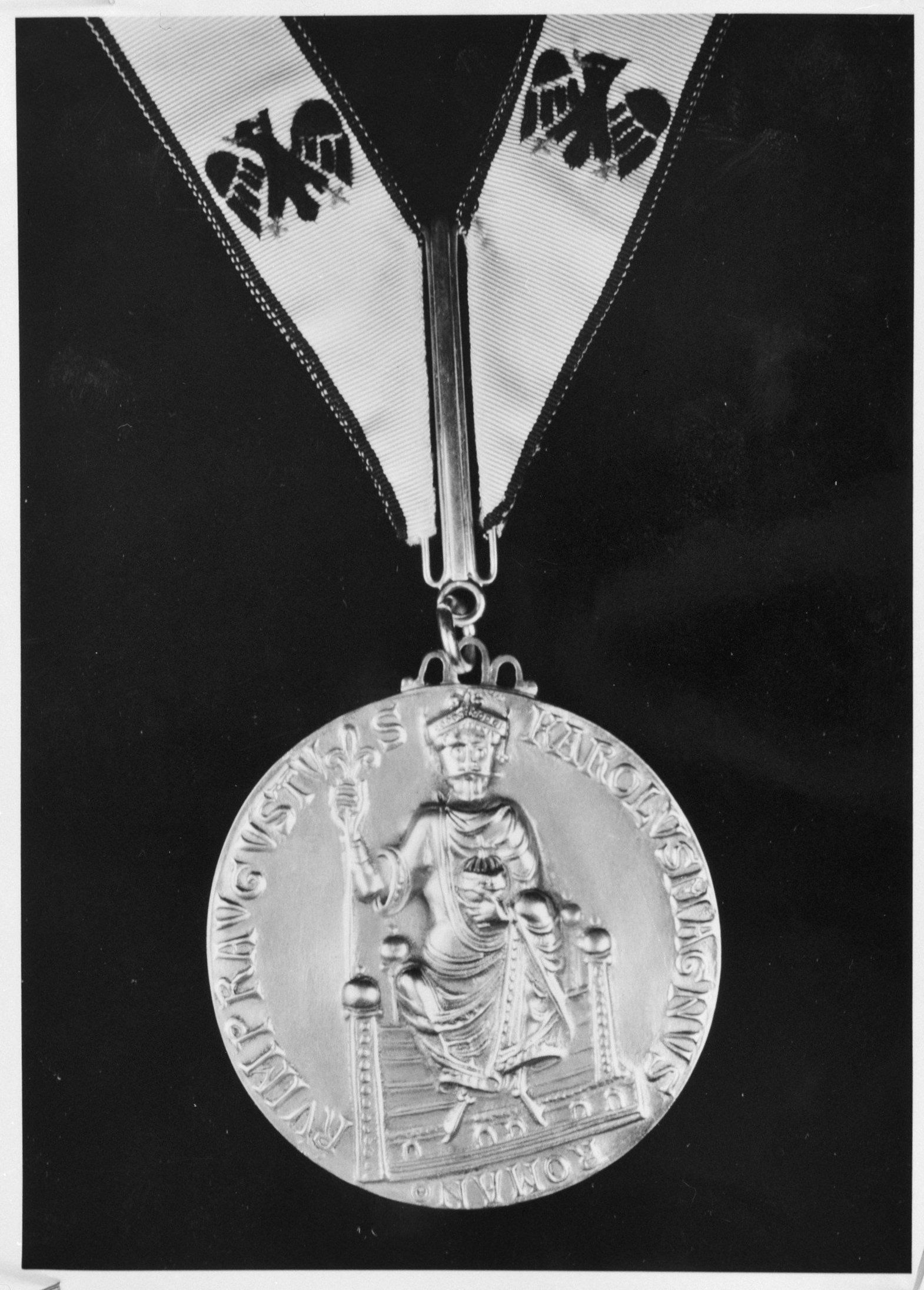
The medal of the Charlemagne Prize, first awarded in 1950

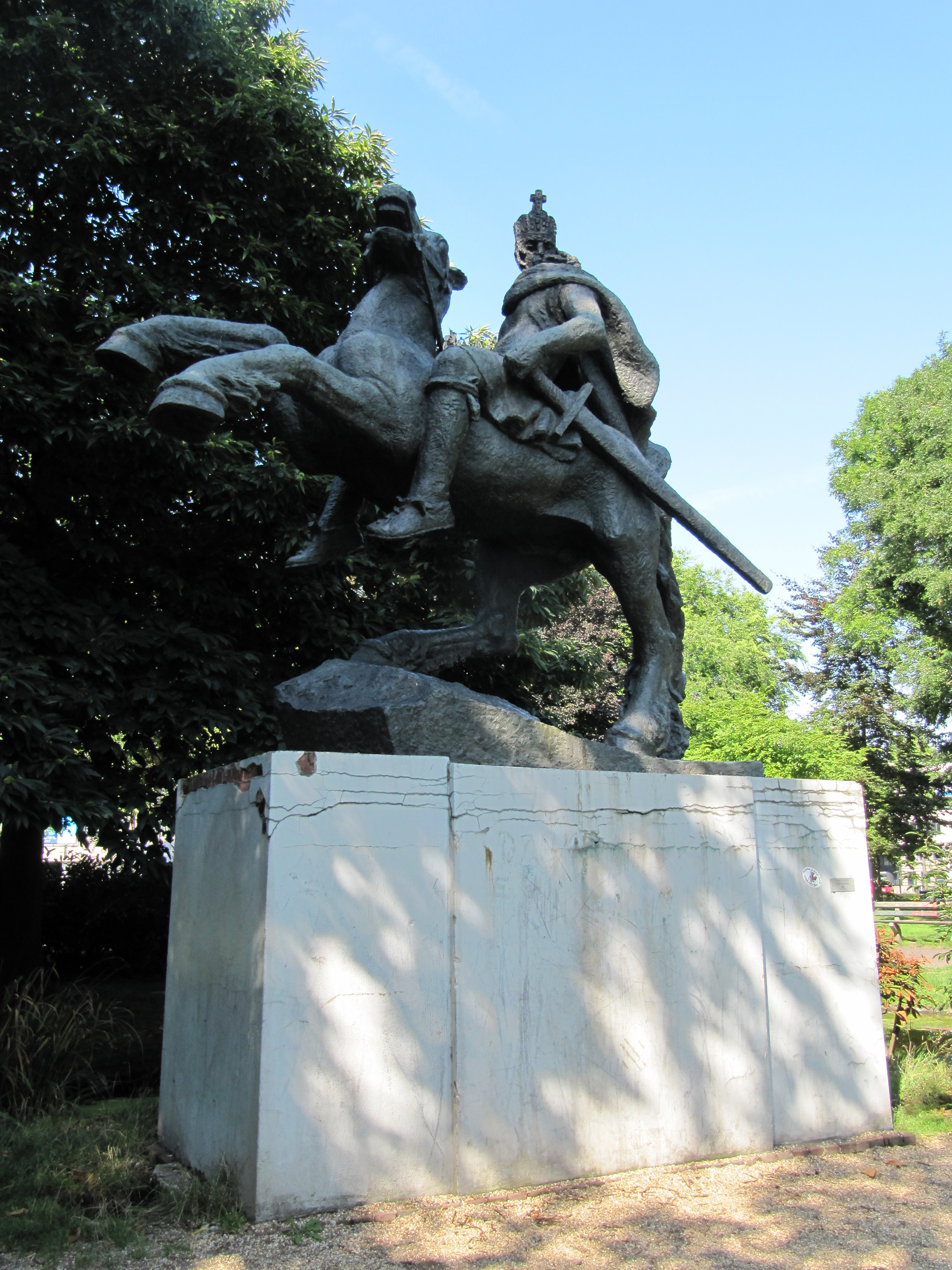
Charlemagne statue in Nijmegen, by Albert Termote, 1960

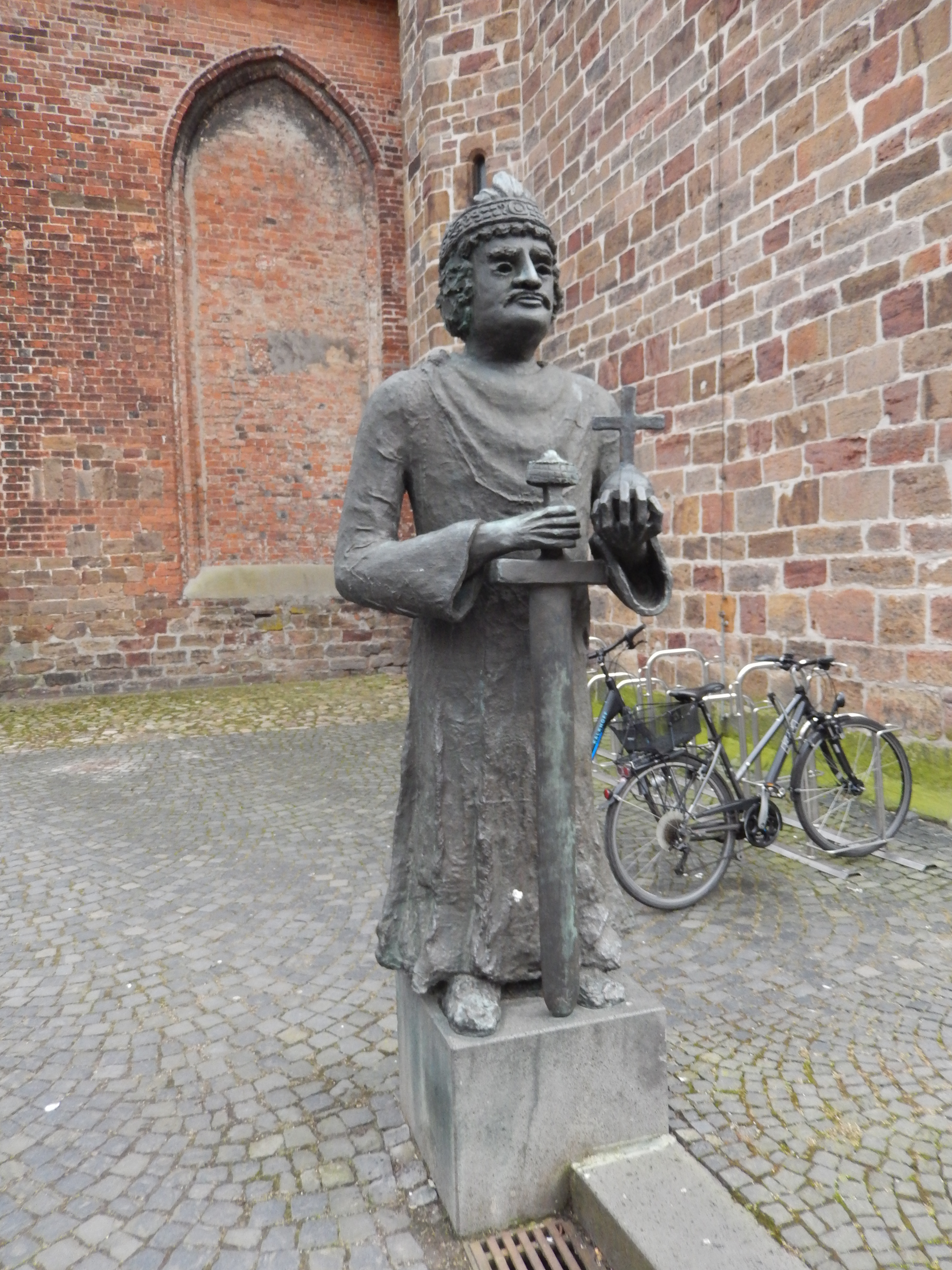
Statue of Charlemagne in Nienburg, Lower Saxony, by Volker Neuhoff, 1991

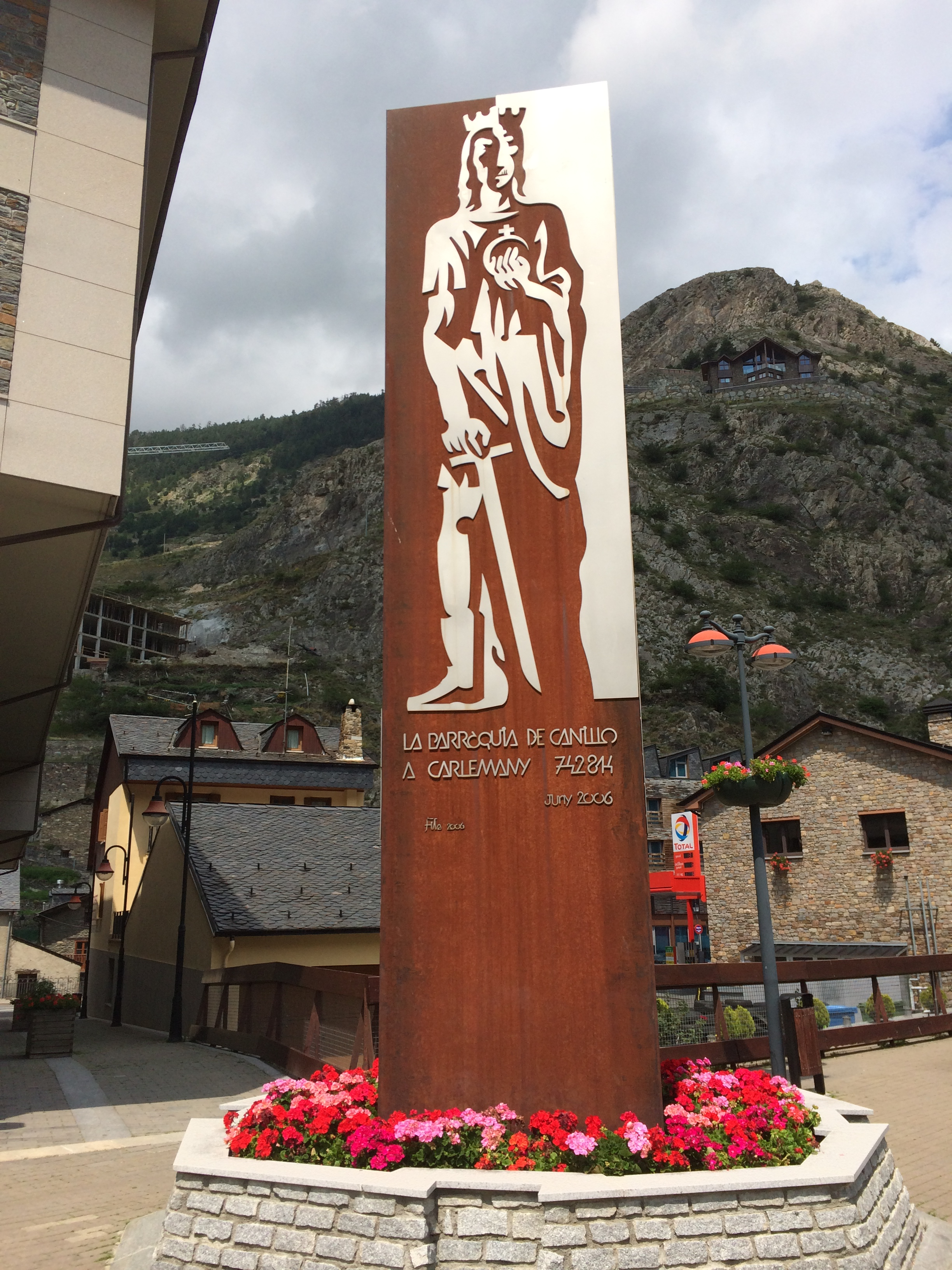
Monument to Charlemagne in Canillo, Andorra, by Domènec Fita i Molat, 2006

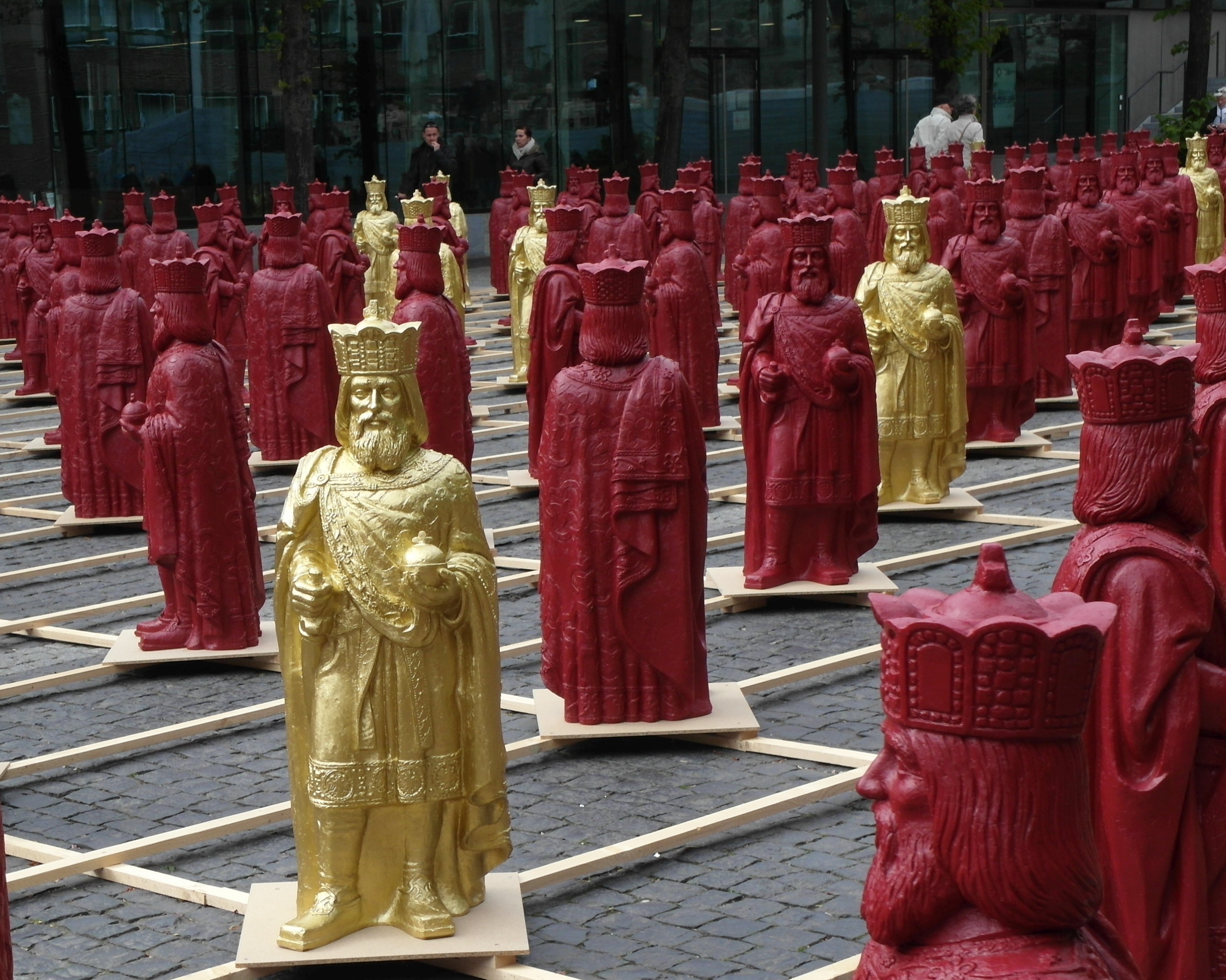
Mein Karl 2014 public installation on the Katschhof at Aachen, by Ottmar Hörl, 2014
