= Parish and Civil Registers in Paris =

Records from Paris, France

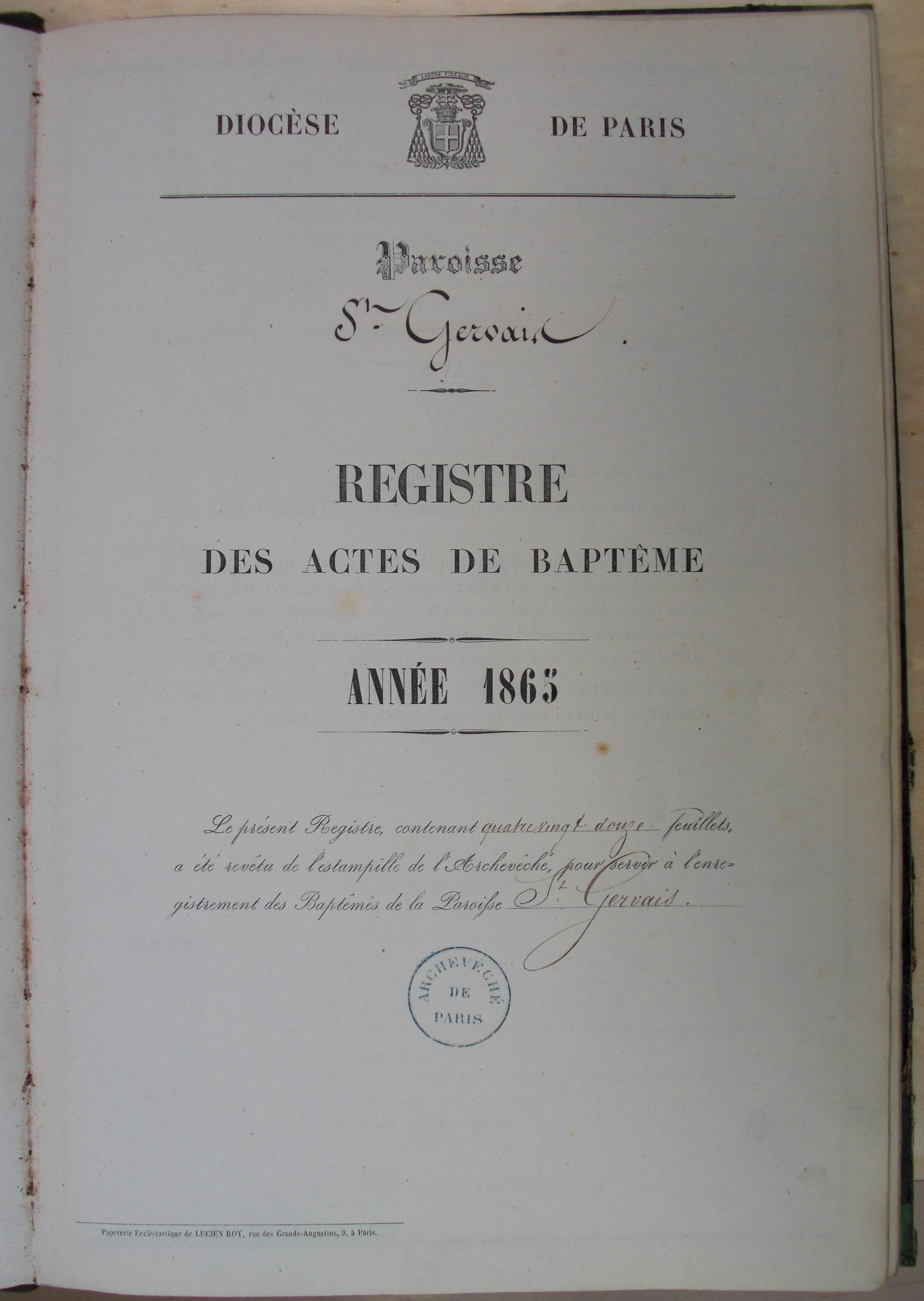
First page of the Saint-Gervais church baptismal register for 1865.

The parish and civil registers in Paris are documents containing records that officially establish the lineage of individuals born, baptized, married, divorced, deceased, or buried in Paris, within its administratively variable boundaries over time. Since the 16th century, the capital has maintained an exceptional quantity of parish registers due to its size and the high number of parishes. Directories accompany the collection.

In May 1871, during the Commune, most of Paris' archives, including its civil records, suffered a major disaster: deliberate fires almost destroyed the parish registers from the 16th century to 1792 and the civil registers from 1793 to 1859, despite being stored at two different sites. The flames obliterated nearly 11,500 registers containing over 8 million documents in a few hours. This resulted in a vast and permanent gap, making historical and genealogical research in Paris particularly challenging today.

== Parish registers of the Ancien Régime ==
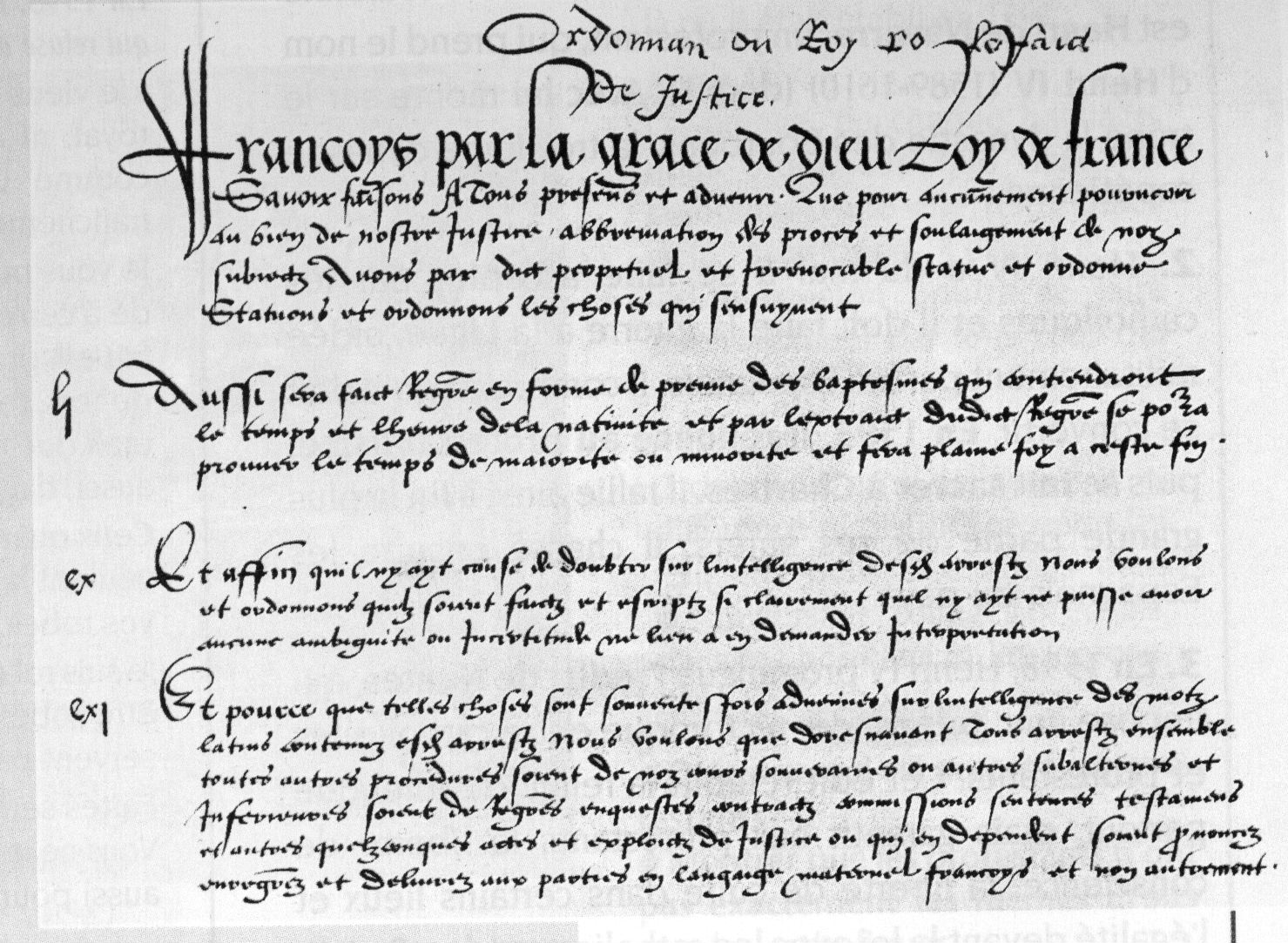
Preamble to the Ordinance of Villers-Cotterêts.

The oldest known parish register in Paris belongs to the parish of Saint-Jean-en-Grève. In agenda format and written in Latin, it covers the period from April 1515 to November 1521. Registers of baptisms were opened as early as 1525 in the parishes of Saint-André-des-Arts and Saint-Jacques-la-Boucherie. The first burial registers, from Saint-Josse and Saint-Landry, date back to 1527.

In August 1539, Francis I issued the Ordinance of Villers-Cotterêts, requiring parish priests to keep a register of baptisms conducted in their church, written in French (Article 51):

A record in the form of proof of baptisms shall be made, containing the time and hour of birth. An extract from this register may be used to prove the age of majority or minority and will serve as full legal evidence for this purpose.

Before this legal requirement, fifteen Parisian parishes already kept baptismal registers, three kept marriage registers, and one kept burial registers.

Presided over by Pope Paul III from 1545 to 1563, the Council of Trent also required priests to keep a register of baptisms performed in their parish. The names of godparents had to be included to prevent marriages between people linked by spiritual kinship (e.g., a godfather and his goddaughter could not marry). The council also mandated that marriages, freely contracted before a priest and two or three witnesses, be preceded by the publication of banns and recorded in a designated register. It also advocated for the union of children without requiring parental consent.

In May 1579, the Ordinance of Blois extended the obligation to keep marriage and burial registers throughout France. The Ordinance of Saint-Germain-en-Laye of April 1667, known as the "Code Louis," required these registers to be kept in duplicate: the first copy (the minute) remained in the parish, while the duplicate (the grosse) was deposited at the court registry. In Paris, the Châtelet registry preserved the second copy, with the oldest dating back to 1668.

By 1790, the capital had around fifty parishes. The law of June 27, 1790, passed by the Constituent Assembly, reorganized the Parisian municipality into forty-eight sections. The city then became the administrative center of the Seine department, which also included several nearby communes.

== Civil Registers created by the revolution (1792) ==
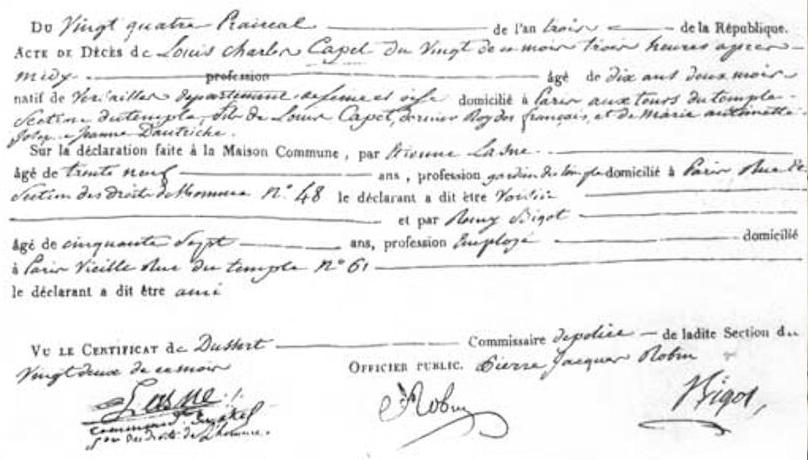
Death certificate of Louis XVII dated June 12, 1795.

The law of June 22, 1792, established that municipalities would receive and preserve civil status records. Consequently, the decree of September 20, 1792, created the civil register system. Starting January 1, 1793, mayors were tasked with birth certificate, marriage, and death records in duplicate. This decree also required all Catholic parishes to submit their parish registers to the municipality (Title VI). It was one of the last decrees passed by the Legislative Assembly, which gave way to the Convention the next day.

According to the decree of September 20, 1792, parish registers were handed over to the municipalities of the twelve districts established in Paris by the law of 19 Vendémiaire Year IV (October 11, 1795). The Palace of Justice, located on the Île de la Cité, received duplicates of these registers along with those of the communes in the newly created Seine department, which retained their local collections.

Although Catholic priests lost their role in maintaining civil status records in 1792, they continued to record baptisms, marriages, and burials they performed. These were called "registers of catholicity" and, from 1793, were kept in each Parisian parish. The law of February 4, 1791, reduced the number of parishes in the capital to thirty-three, abolishing twenty-seven and creating nine new ones. (Note: Paris currently boasts one hundred and thirteen parish churches.) Most Parisian Catholic registers began in the early 19th century, following the 1801 Concordat signed between Napoleon Bonaparte and Pope Pius VII. These registers were kept in duplicate for baptisms and marriages but in a single copy for burials. Article LV of Title III of the Concordat specified that "the registers kept by religious ministers, being and only concerning the administration of sacraments, cannot under any circumstances replace the registers required by law to document the civil status of French citizens." Nevertheless, these religious registers were largely used to reconstruct Paris's civil records after the 1871 disaster.

== Thiers wall (1844) – Territorial reform (1860) ==
On the proposal of the politician Adolphe Thiers, after whom it would be named, a fortification was built around Paris from 1841 to 1844 by order of Louis-Philippe I. The king was convinced that defending the territory required preventing the capital from falling into the hands of foreign armies, as had occurred in 1814 during the Battle of Paris. Louis-Philippe thus wanted to encircle the city with fortifications to make it impregnable. With fifty-two gates or posterns, this fortification encompassed the capital and all or part of the surrounding communes. In these areas, residents avoided the octroi taxes imposed on Parisians, which the Wall of the Farmers-General enforced as both an administrative boundary and a fiscal burden.

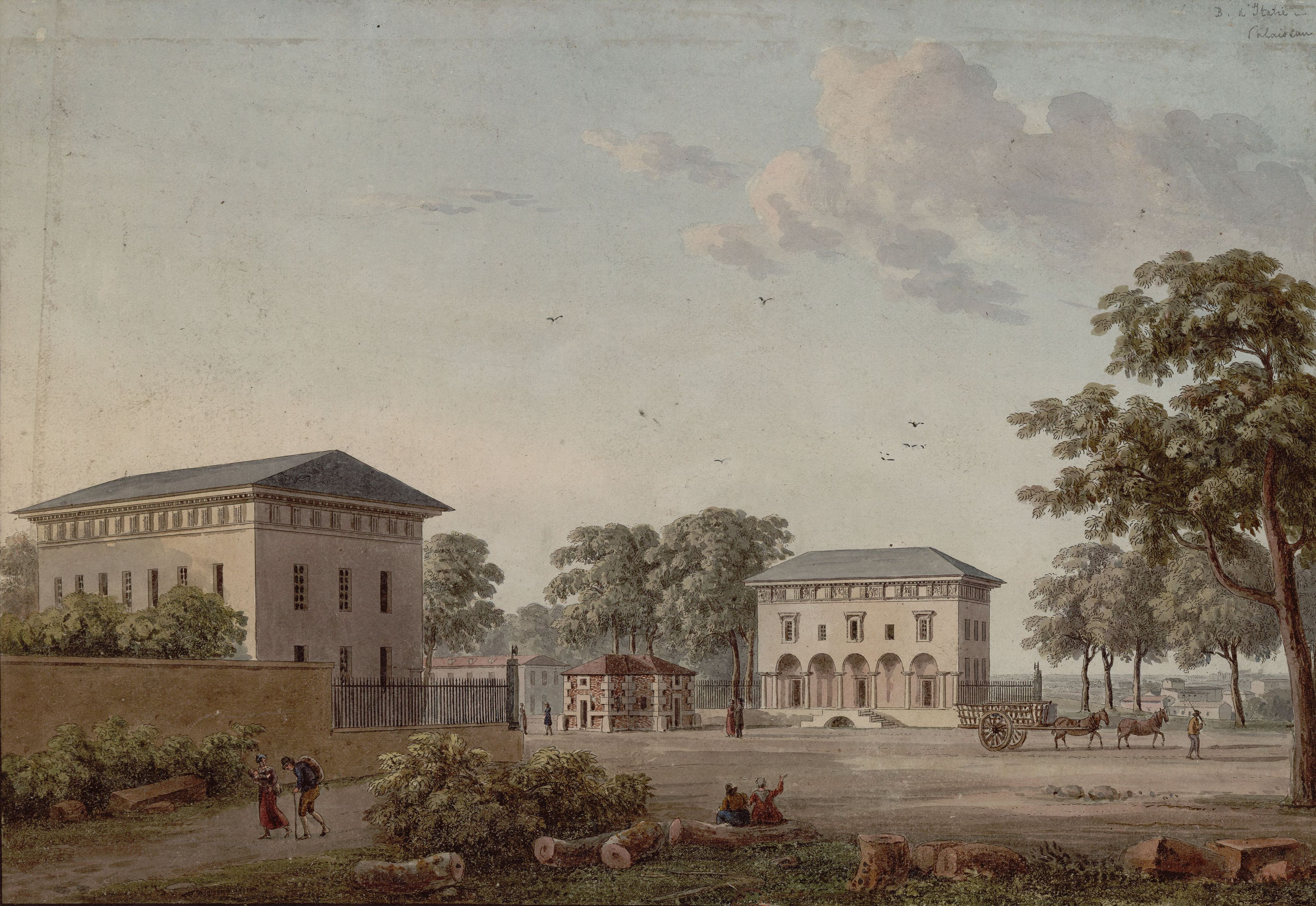
The Barrière d'Italie in 1819.

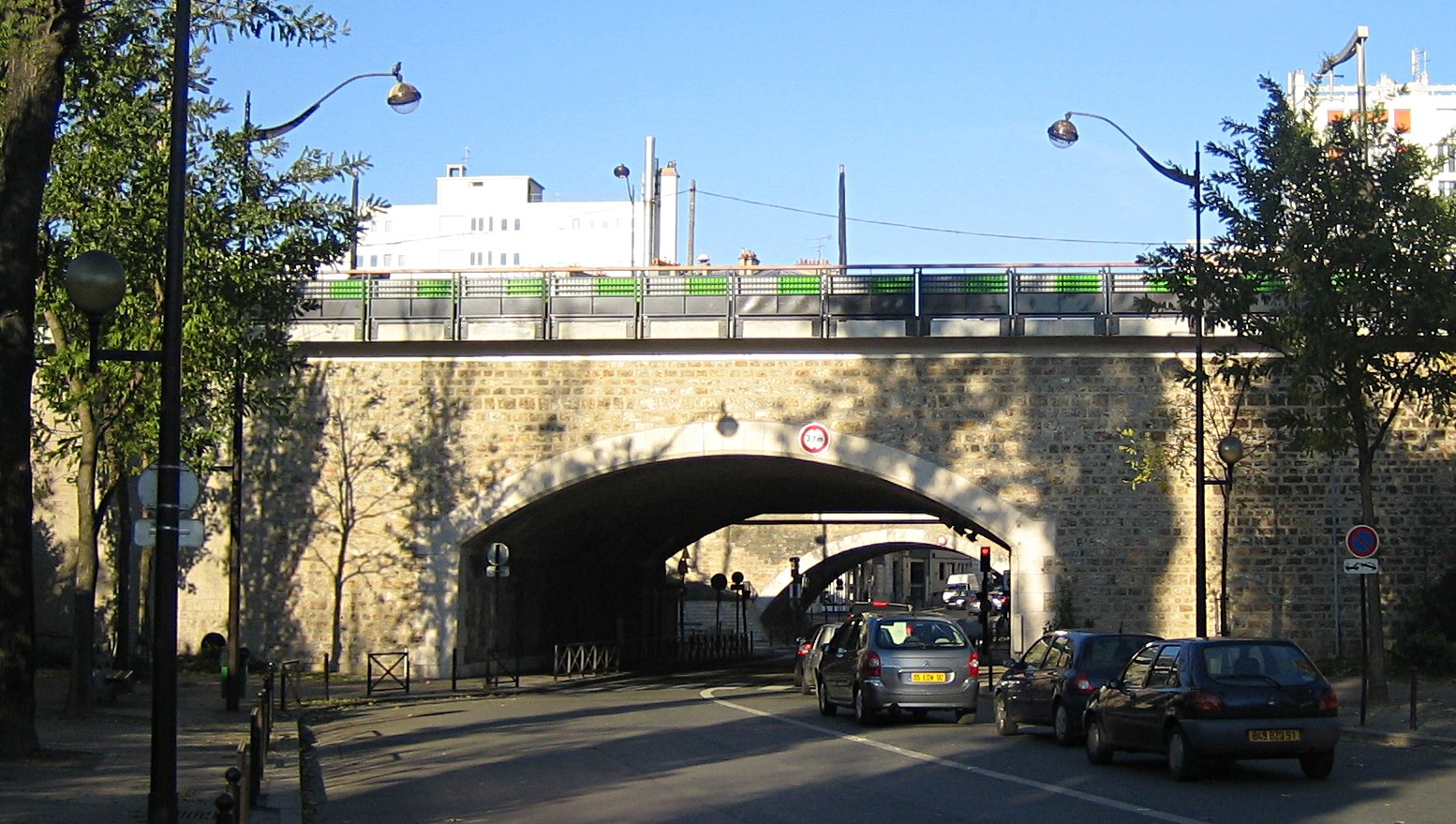
Poterne des Peupliers, a rare vestige of Thiers wall.

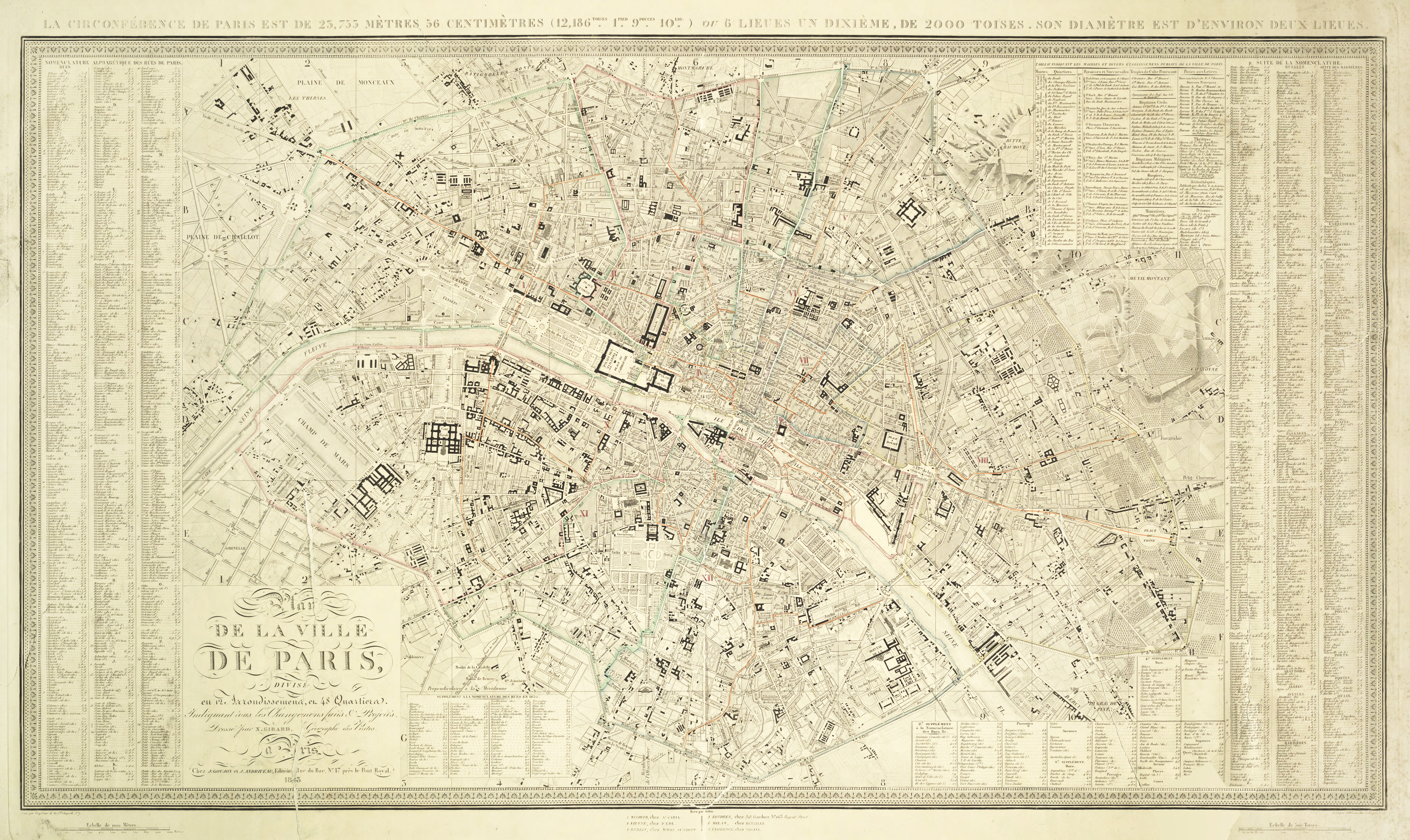
Map of Paris (1843) divided into twelve arrondissements and 48 districts.

The twelve former arrondissements of Paris.

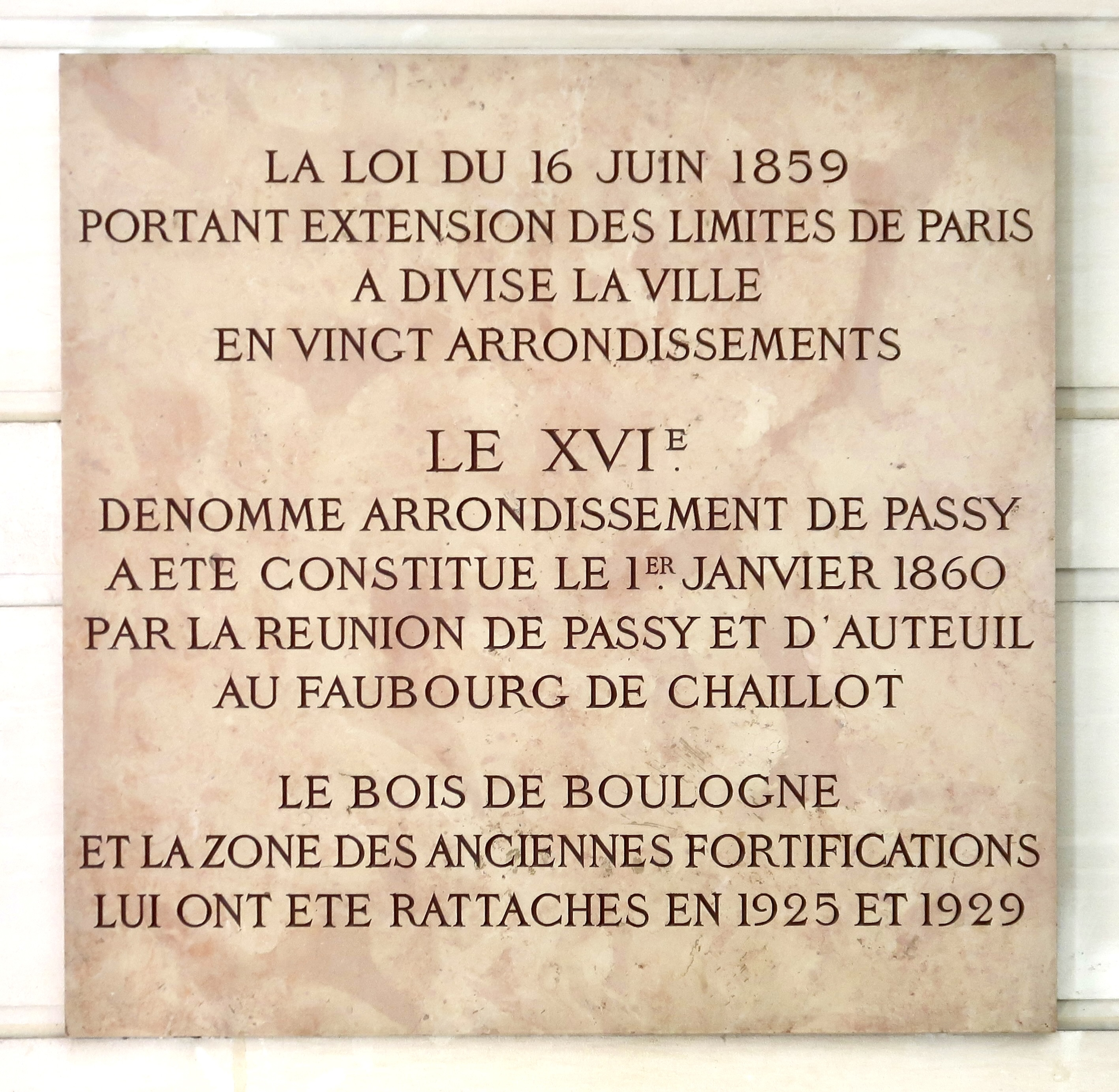
Commemorative plaque at the 16th arrondissement town hall, commemorating the territorial reform of 1860.

By the decree of February 16, 1859, and the law of June 16, 1859, Napoleon III extended Paris’s territory to the Thiers wall. On January 1, 1860, the city expanded from twelve to twenty districts. It absorbed, fully or partially, some nearby suburban communes.

The 11 fully annexed communes, moving from southwest to southeast through the north and east, were: Vaugirard, Grenelle, Auteuil, Passy, Batignolles-Monceau, Montmartre, La Chapelle, La Villette, Belleville, Charonne, and Bercy.

The 13 partially annexed communes, following the same directional pattern, were: Issy-les-Moulineaux, Neuilly, Clichy, Saint-Ouen, Aubervilliers, Pantin, Le Pré-Saint-Gervais, Bagnolet, Saint-Mandé, Ivry, Gentilly, Vanves, and Montrouge.

Since the twenty newly created districts differed geographically from the twelve older ones, the original parish registers up to 1792 and civil records covering 1793 to 1859 were stored at City Hall, along with those of fully annexed communes. All duplicates, forming the "Greffe collection," were stored at the Palais de Justice. Partially annexed communes retained their original registers, but their duplicates were also sent to the Palais de Justice.

== Destruction during the commune (1871) ==
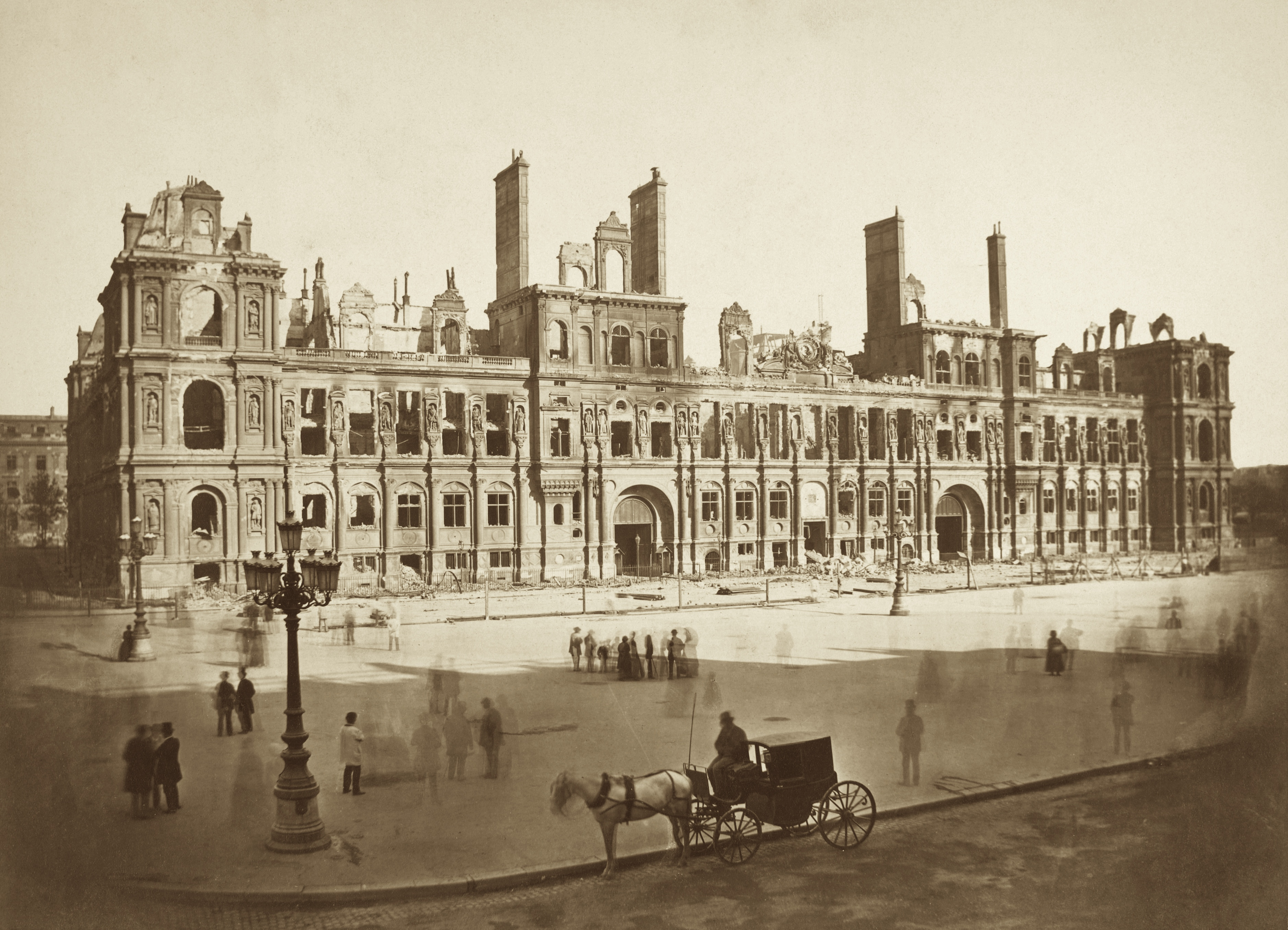
Paris City Hall after its destruction by Communards in 1871.

On May 23, 1871, at the instigation of anarchist Jean-Louis Pindy, Communards set fire to many public buildings, including Paris’ City Hall. The civil records, stored in an annex at 4 Avenue Victoria, were the first to burn. Within hours, the originals of civil and parish registers were destroyed, along with the collection of the Historical Library of Paris, which had been transferred to City Hall. Just days earlier, on May 17, 1871, Louise Michel had declared at the "Club de la Trinité": "Paris will be ours or will no longer exist!"

On May 24, 1871, the day after City Hall’s destruction, Communards burned the Palais de Justice on orders from Blanquist Théophile Ferré. The second copies of civil and parish registers for Paris and all communes in the Seine were lost as well. Besides civil registry offices, much of the Palais was destroyed: the offices of the Court of First Instance; the General Prosecutor’s Office; the Public Prosecutor’s Office; judges’ chambers; two criminal courts (completed just two years earlier); much of the Court of Cassation; the Court of Appeal; the Great Hall and Grand Chamber; the Correctional Police; and the archives.

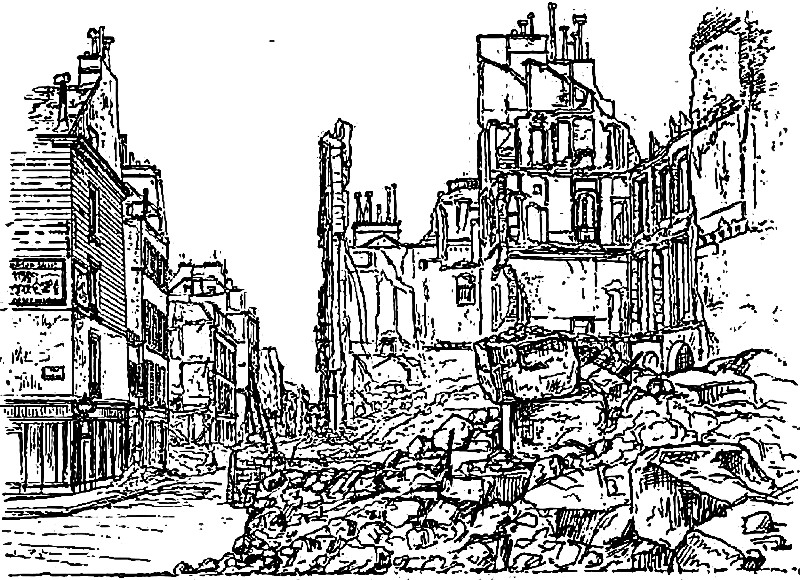
The house of writer Prosper Mérimée, 52 rue de Lille, Paris, destroyed by fire in 1871.

During this civil war, which ended the Commune, many other Parisian buildings burned, sometimes accidentally due to artillery fire from both sides. In mere hours, centuries of history were destroyed, including the Tuileries Palace, Palais-Royal, Orsay Palace (seat of the Court of Accounts), the Ministry of Finance, the Palace of the Legion of Honor (where many records of honorees were lost), the Police Prefecture, the Louvre Library, the General Warehouses, Gare de Lyon, and the home of Prosper Mérimée at 52 Rue de Lille, which housed his correspondence and part of his library.

However, some buildings escaped destruction: the National Archives were saved by Louis-Guillaume Debock, who stopped his Communard comrades from setting them ablaze; the Louvre Museum; the Sainte-Chapelle, already doused in petroleum; Notre-Dame, where interns from Hôtel-Dieu extinguished a fire; and the Granary of Abundance at the Arsenal Basin.

Prior to the destruction of City Hall and the Palais de Justice, Paris' archives included:

- 4,114 parish registers dating before 1792, with 81 indexes
- 47 registers of banns publications
- 15 registers for Protestant civil records
- 7,300 civil registers (1792–1859) stored in 1,002 boxes

The total losses exceeded eight million documents.

The memory of the Parisian population, preserved since the 16th century, was thus almost entirely obliterated—both that of the "people of Paris" and of the greatest moments in French history, including the births, baptisms, marriages, deaths, and burials of eminent figures. Historian Count de Chastellux wrote:

"The destruction of the civil registers stored at the Paris archives (Avenue Victoria) and the registry of the Seine Civil Court is not only a profound disruption for families but also infinitely distressing from a historical perspective. It was the most complete collection of its kind in France, dating back to the reign of Francis I. Within more than 150,000 registers lay solutions to countless questions: historians, biographers, genealogists, topographers, and autograph enthusiasts found a rich and precious mine there."

In the second edition of Critical Dictionary of Biography and History (1872), archivist Auguste Jal similarly lamented: "The Civil Archives of Paris were annihilated by fire, both at the Palais de Justice and the depot on Avenue Victoria, during those bloody days of furious hatred, criminal enterprises, and wild and savage acts that marked the few days in mid-May 1871. It was only natural for those who wished to abolish families to include in their incendiary program the destruction of records that established the genealogies of all families—certain genealogies of the people, the bourgeoisie, and the nobility. [...] They needed to burn the proof of their ancestors' marriages, their parents', their own, and their children's. They no longer wanted marriages, so what did the registers of old Parisian parishes and municipalities matter to them? These documents, which for each family composed its history, were just ashes to be scattered to the wind. They knew that the records documenting their births, those of their wives, children, and grandparents would be lost. Yet they did not hesitate, despite realizing these births would remain uncertain and unproven in the future. What all sensible people living in society respect was reduced to nothing more than ashes cast to the wind. [...] If I foresaw revolutions, if I thought one might see terror return, I did not anticipate that innocent collections of documents—where the poor, commoners, artists, and craftsmen stood side by side with the rich, nobles, partisans, ministers, and princes—would become targets."

In 1847, A. Taillandier published a list of the starting dates of parish registers in several cities, distinguishing births (baptisms), marriages, and deaths (burials). In the section on Paris, after transcribing the oldest records verbatim, he provided a list of parishes. For several of these parishes, which did not exist under the Ancien Régime—such as Saint-Ambroise, Saint-François d'Assise, Saint-Germain-des-Prés, or Notre-Dame—the registers began in 1791.

Starting dates of Paris parish registers
Parish	Births	Marriages	Deaths	Parish	Births	Marriages	Deaths
Saint-Ambroise	1791	1791	1791	Saint-Jean-de-Latran	1592	1592	1592
Saint-André-des-Arcs	1525	1545	1545	Saint-Josse	1527	1527	1527
Saint-Antoine	1791	1791	1791	Saints-Innocents	1561	1561	1561
Saint-Augustin	1791	1791	1791	Saint-Landry	1527	1527	1527
Saint-Barthélemy	1551	1578	1598	Saint-Laurent	1527	1611	1622
Saint-Benoît	1540	1586	1590	Saint-Leu et Saint-Gilles	1533	1635	1608
Bonne-Nouvelle	1628	1639	1665	Saint-Louis-en-l'Île	1623	1624	1624
Cardinal Lemoine	1688	1688	1631	Saint-Louis-du-Louvre	1603	1603	1603
Sainte-Chapelle Basse	1568	1568	1559	Sainte-Madeleine-de-la-Cité	1539	1610	1610
Saint-Pierre-de-Chaillot	1620	1620	1620	Sainte-Madelaine-de-la-Ville-l'Évêque	1598	1650	1624
Sainte-Croix-en-la-Cité	1548	1548	1513	Saint-Marcel	1546	1620	1620
Saint-Côme	1539	1547	1592	Sainte-Marguerite	1663	1713	1637
Saint-Christophe	1597	1649	1597	Sainte-Marine	1634	1634	1634
Saint-Denis-de-la-Châtre	1550	1550	1550	Saint-Martial	1597	1657	1657
Saint-Étienne-du-Mont	1530	1668	1669	Saint-Médard	1545	1542	1692
Saint-Eustache	1529	1580	1568	Saint-Merry	1536	1557	1630
Saint-François-d'Assise	1791	1791	1791	Saint-Nicolas-des-Champs	1580	1605	1589
Sainte-Geneviève-des-Ardents	1551	1551	1551	Saint-Nicolas-du-Chardonnet	1536	1603	1538
Saint-Germain-l'Auxerrois	1528	1541	1668	Notre-Dame	1791	1634	1791
Saint-Germain-des-Prés	1791	1791	1791	Sainte-Opportune	1541	>>	>>
Saint-Germain-le-Vieil	1545	1545	1515	Saint-Paul	1539	1560	1585
Saint-Gervais	1531	1608	1639	Saint-Pierre-aux-Bœufs	1578	1578	1578
Gros-Caillou	1738	1738	1738	Saint-Pierre-des-Arcis	1539	1539	1539
Saint-Hilaire	1547	1547	1664	Saint-Philippe-du-Roule	1697	1697	1697
Saint-Hippolyte	1604	1633	1653	Qunize-Vingts	1636	1636	1636
Saint-Honoré	1593	1593	1593	Saint-Roch	1578	1595	1595
Saint-Jacques-la-Boucherie	1525	1523	1613	Saint-Sauveur	1545	1627	1571
Saint-Jacques-du-Haut-Pas	1567	1615	1665	Saint-Séverin	1537	1599	1594
Saint-Jacques-l'Hôpital	1616	1616	1615	Saint-Sulpice	1537	1544	1604
Saint-Jean-en-Grève	1526	1515	1629	Saint-Thomas-d'Aquin	1791	1791	1791
Saint-Jean-le-Rond	1655	1655	1655	Saint-Victor	1594	1594	1594
Source: Historical notes on old civil registers in Paris

In 1890, E. Welvert published a summary report on the old archives of the Seine department, destroyed in 1871. This report was compiled by an archivist from the Prefecture named Aubert. Discrepancies in dates appear between the two lists, and some parishes are missing from one or the other.

Parish registers of Paris within its pre-1860 boundaries
Parish	Extreme dates	Records	Parish	Extreme dates	Records
Saint-André-des-Arts	(1525-1789)	55	Saint-Laurent	(1527-1789)	229
Saint-Barthélemy	(1551-1791)	54	Saint-Leu et Saint-Gilles	(1533-1790)	53
Saint-Benoît	(1540-1790)	56	Saint-Louis-du-Louvre	(1603-1791)	4
Bonne-Nouvelle	(1628-1791)	53	Saint-Louis-en-l'Île	(1623-1789)	189
Cardinal-Lemoine	(1628-1791)	3	Sainte-Madeleine-en-la-Cité	(1539-1791)	28
Sainte-Chapelle	(1541-1790)	10	Sainte-Madeleine-la-Ville-l'Évêque	(1598-1789)	81
Saint-Christophe-en-la-Cité	(1597-1747)	8	Sainte-Marie-du-Temple	(1581-1791)	14
Saint-Pierre-du-Gros-Caillou	(1738-1789)	32	Sainte-Marguerite	(1637-1789)	109
Saint-Cosme	(1539-1791)	31	Sainte-Marine	(1634-1791)	9
Sainte-Croix-en-la-Cité	(1548-1791)	11	Saint-Martial	(1527-1722)	6
Saint-Denis-de-La-Châtre	(1550-1698)	4	Saint-Martin et Saint-Marcel	(1546-1791)	36
Saint-Étienne-du-Mont	(1530-1790)	161	Saint-Médard	(1545-1789)	79
Saint-Eustache	(1529-1789)	395	Saint-Merry	(1536-1789)	86
Sainte-Geneviève-des-Ardents	(1551-1747)	7	Saint-Nicolas-des-Champs	(1580-1789)	299
Saint-Germain-l'Auxerrois	(1528-1789)	336	Saint-Nicolas-du-Chardonnet	(1536-1790)	81
Saint-Germain-le-Vieux	(1545-1791)	24	Sainte-Opportune	(1541-1791)	16
Saint-Gervais	(1531-1789)	143	Saint-Paul	(1539-1790)	205
Saint-Hilaire	(1574-1791)	20	Saint-Philippe-du-Roule	(1697-1790)	10
Saint-Hippolyte	(1604-1791)	36	Saint-Pierre-de-Chaillot	(1620-1789)	29
Saint-Honoré	(1593-1791)	5	Saint-Pierre-aux-Bœufs	(1578-1790)	8
Saints-Innocents	(1581-1786)	15	Quinze-Vingts	(1636-1791)	14
Saint-Jacques-du-Haut-Pas	(1567-1790)	45	Saint-Roch	(1578-1790)	181
Saint-Jacques-le-Majeur	(1525-1789)	113	Saint-Sauveur	(1547-1792)	108
Saint-Jacques-l'Hôpital	(1616-1791)	6	Saint-Sépulcre	(1674-1791)	2
Saint-Jean-en-Grève	(1515-1791)	121	Saint-Sulpice	(1537-1790)	449
Saint-Jean-de-Latran	(1592-1791)	8	Saint-Victor	(1594-1791)	2
Saint-Jean-le-Rond	(1607-1791)	11	Répertoires		81
Saint-Josse	(1527-1791)	9	Publications de bans	(1642-1790)	47
Saint-Landry	(1527-1791)	15	État civil des protestants	(1680-1790)	15
Source: Summary of the old Seine archives burnt in 1871

To this inventory, one must add the parish registers of the communes fully annexed to Paris in 1860:

Parish registers of communes fully annexed in 1860
Parish	Extreme dates	Records	Parish	Extreme dates	Records
Saint-Denys-de-la-Chapelle	(?-?)	?	Saint-Germain-de-Charonne	(?-?)	?
Saint-Jacques-Saint-Christophe-de-la-Villette	(?-?)	?	Saint-Jean-Baptiste de Belleville	(?-?)	?
Saint-Lambert-de-Vaugirard	(?-?)	?	Saint-Pierre de Montmartre	(1565-?)	?
Notre-Dame-d'Auteuil	(?-?)	?			

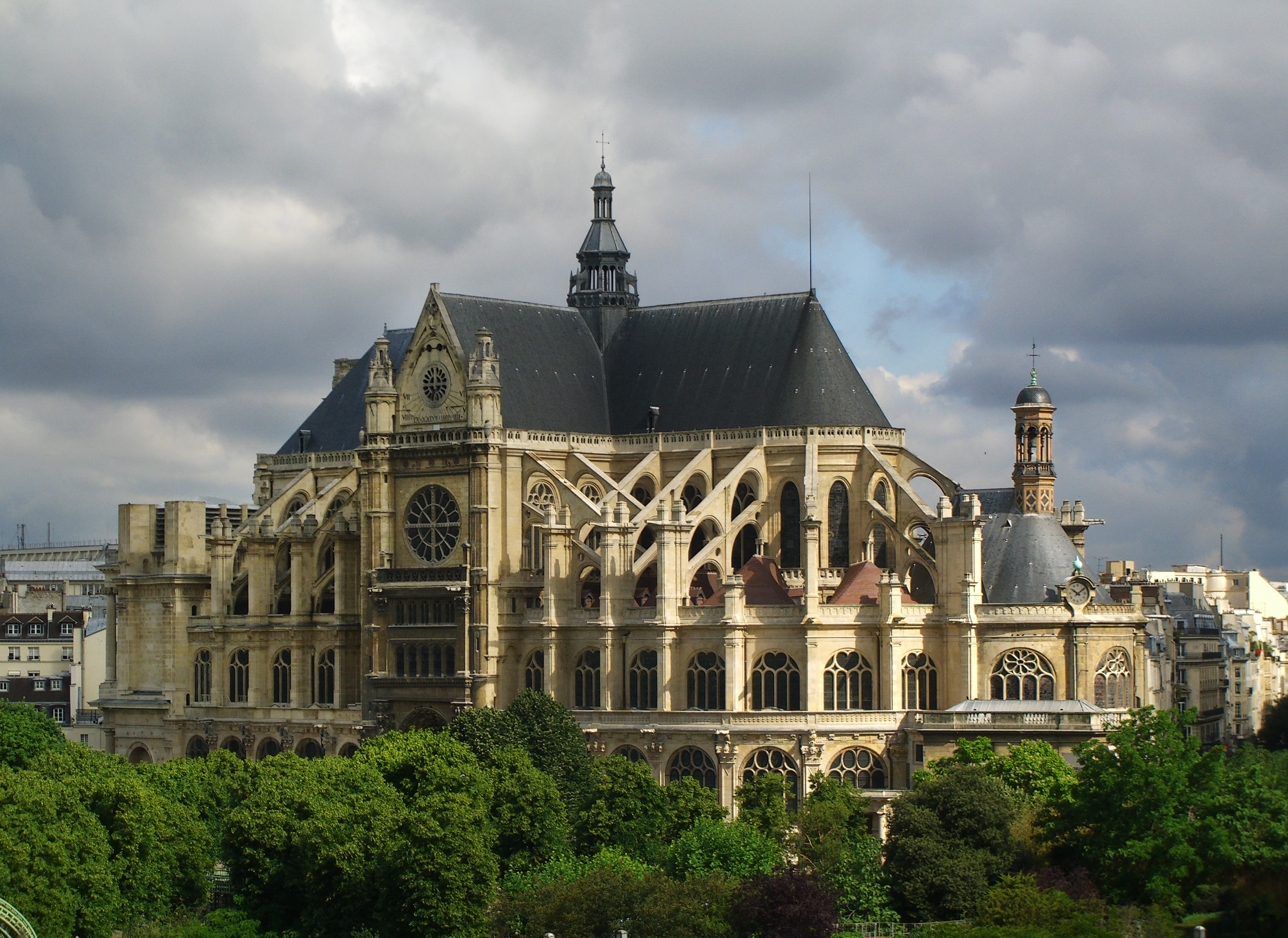
Saint-Eustache church.

Communes in the former Seine department.

What survived amounts to only 29 articles. An ambiguous wording in the latest guide to the Paris Archives suggests that many registers were preserved. For example, it mentions a register from Saint-Eustache covering the period 1529–1748, even though this parish originally had 395 registers dating from 1529 to 1789.

The mentioned registers are collections of excerpts compiled by Abraham Charles Guiblet. They pertain to noble or notable individuals and may be very brief, sometimes indicating only the name of a godparent or witness. These are preserved in the Manuscripts Department of the Bibliothèque nationale de France. Some have been digitized:

- parish of Saint-Eustache,
- parish of Saint-Nicolas-du-Chardonnet,
- parish of Saint-Sauveur,
- parish of Saint-Jean-en-Grève,
- parish of Saint-André-des-Arcs,
- Saint-Sulpice parish (mortuaries),
- parish of Saint-Sulpice (baptisms),
- parishes of la Madeleine de la Ville-l'Évêque, Saint-Honoré, Saint-Landry, Saint-Médard, Saint-Merry, Saint-Roch.

=== Communes of the former Seine department ===
The destruction caused by the Commune affected not only the originals stored at the annex of the Hôtel de Ville, located at 4 Avenue Victoria, but also the duplicates from the Greffe collection, which were destroyed in the fire at the Palais de Justice on May 24, 1871. The disaster obliterated most of the parish registers (pre-1793) and civil status records (1793–1859) from the communes of the former Seine department. The situation varies depending on how these areas were incorporated into Paris in 1860:

- Fully annexed localities (Auteuil, Batignolles-Monceau, Belleville, Bercy, Charonne, Grenelle, La Chapelle, La Villette, Montmartre, Passy, and Vaugirard): Everything disappeared along with the registers of the Parisian arrondissements—both originals and duplicates. (Note: On the trail of your ancestors in Paris. April 1997 (guide published by Archives de Paris). Pages 24 and 25).)
- Partially annexed localities (Aubervilliers, Bagnolet, Clichy, Gentilly, Ivry, Montrouge, Neuilly, Pantin, Le Pré-Saint-Gervais, Saint-Mandé, Saint-Ouen, and Vanves) or non-annexed areas (the rest of what is today known as the Petite Couronne): The originals, having been preserved locally, are still accessible in municipal archives unless transferred to the Departmental Archives of Hauts-de-Seine, Seine-Saint-Denis, or Val-de-Marne. The duplicates, however, were destroyed, except for the decennial tables covering 1793–1859.

== Reconstitution of civil records (1872–1897) ==
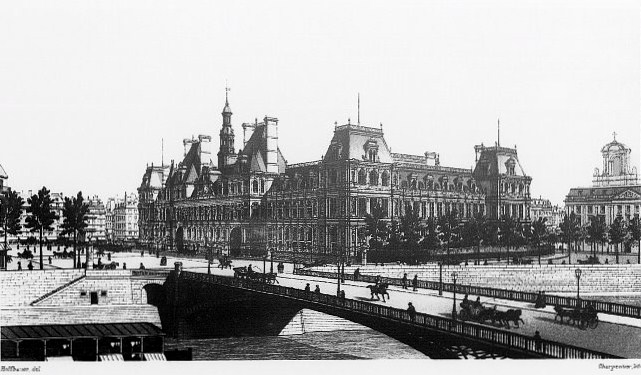
Paris City Hall in the early 20th century.

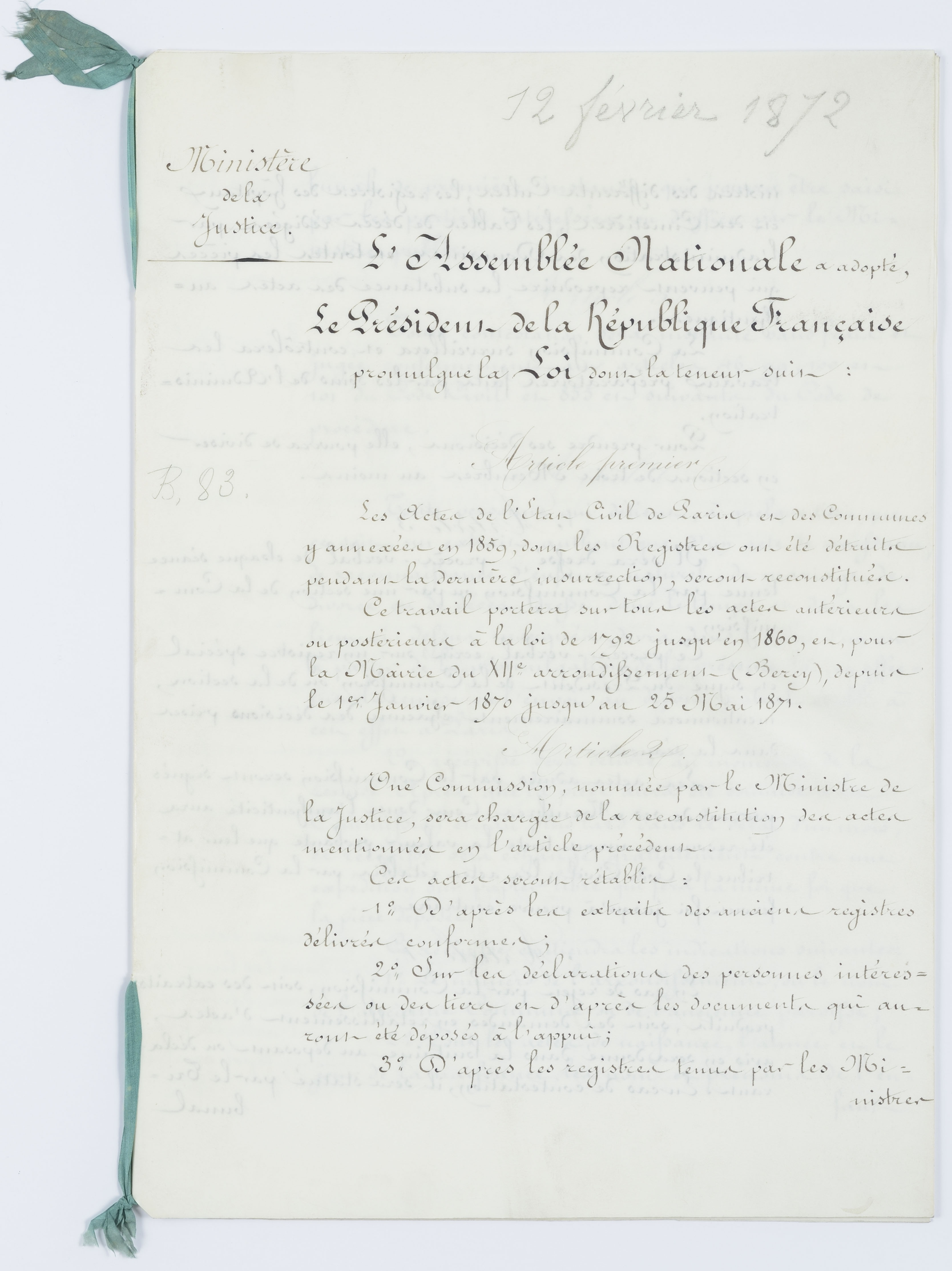
Law of February 12, 1872, on civil status in Paris. Archives nationales A//1359

To address the destruction, a commission created by the law of February 12, 1872, was tasked with reconstructing Parisian civil records before 1860. This work relied on cross-referencing family papers (notices in particular), notarial deeds, and records of parish and civil acts compiled before 1871 by archivists such as Auguste Jal, especially for prominent individuals. However, the main sources used were Catholic registers from 1793 to 1860, preserved in parishes and had not been burned.

Accompanied by alphabetical index cards for searching, the reconstructed records were produced in duplicate through three distinct methods:

- Authentic extracts elevated to the rank of originals (Series A);
- Declarations by individuals (Series B);
- Official reconstructions based on documents held by the administration or registers transferred to it (Series C).

This operation lasted until 1897 and ended due to a lack of funds. It made it possible to restore slightly more than 2.6 million records, most of which date from the 19th century. Only 347,000 records were restored for the Ancien Régime, with just five dating back to the 16th century. Altogether, the restored documents represent only one-third of those that were destroyed. Birth records are the most numerous, with approximately 1,422,000 records dating from 1550 to 1859, compared to around 922,000 death records from 1568 to 1859 and 322,000 marriage records from 1630 to 1859. However, the vast majority of data, particularly that concerning families without descendants, is lost forever.

The reconstructed records are preserved at the Archives of Paris. Their duplicates, stored at the Montlignon Fort (Val-d’Oise), were destroyed in a fire in June 1974.

== Second reconstruction (1941–1958) ==
A second reconstruction was carried out between 1941 and 1958, initiated by François Jourda de Vaux de Foletier (1893–1988), director of the Seine Archives. This effort, referred to as the "second reconstruction," primarily used documents donated by families, biographical works, and dictionaries. It includes over 400 boxes, organized alphabetically by family name, and classified into births, marriages (listed only under the husband’s name), and deaths.

The Archives of Paris continue to receive records or copies of documents to supplement the civil records. These contributions usually come from individuals who uncover materials during their research, effectively extending the "second reconstruction" of Parisian civil records.

== Civil records from 1871 to present ==
=== “Corrected records” (1871) ===
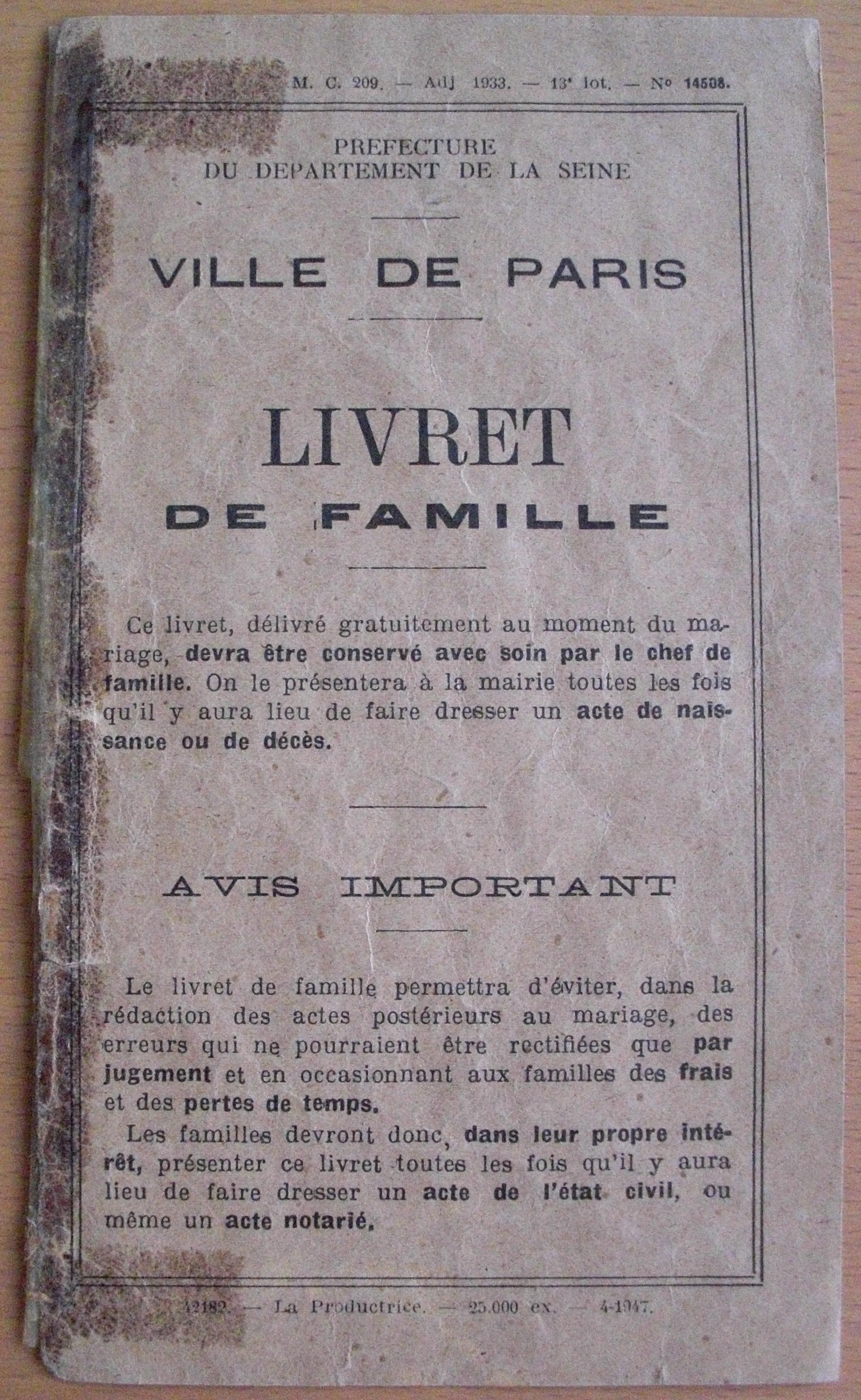
Cover of a family record book from 1948 in Paris.

Under the law of July 19, 1871, civil records registered from March 18, 1871, during the Paris Commune, were annulled and rewritten between August 1, 1871, and September 30, 1871, and in the following years. These revised records are referred to as "corrected records" (actes bâtonnés). Only the rewritten records were included in decennial tables, and their dates can differ significantly from the actual events they record. Despite being invalidated by law, the original corrected records remain in the registers and can be searched like any others.

At the 12th arrondissement town hall, an accidental fire destroyed birth records from January 1, 1870, to May 25, 1871. These records were reestablished and are classified alongside those reconstructed in the official civil records reconstruction.

=== Family record book (1877) ===
The loss of Parisian civil records largely influenced the creation of the family record book in 1877, introduced by a circular from Jules Simon, President of the Council and Minister of the Interior. (Note: The original of this circular is kept at the Archives Nationales under the symbol: Fla 3539) The circular explicitly referenced the Commune’s destruction, stating that “family record books will serve as a third deposit of civil records entrusted to individuals and will provide valuable information should registers be destroyed.”

The law of April 5, 1884, concerning municipal organization, required town halls to budget for the costs of family record books. (Note: Law of April 5, 1884, art. 136, §4 (JO of April 6, 1884 - BO No. 835, p. 369 et seq.).)

=== Marginal notes ===
Like that of all French municipalities, Parisian civil records have been updated over time. Since October 28, 1922, birth records have included the dates and places of birth of the parents. Marginal notes have gradually been added to birth records, including the dates and places of marriage and legitimations since the law of August 17, 1897, divorce information since March 10, 1932, and the dates and places of death since the ordinance of March 29, 1945.

=== Recording methods ===
Originally handwritten, Parisian civil records began being typed in the second half of 1922.

=== Transcriptions at the 1st arrondissement town hall ===
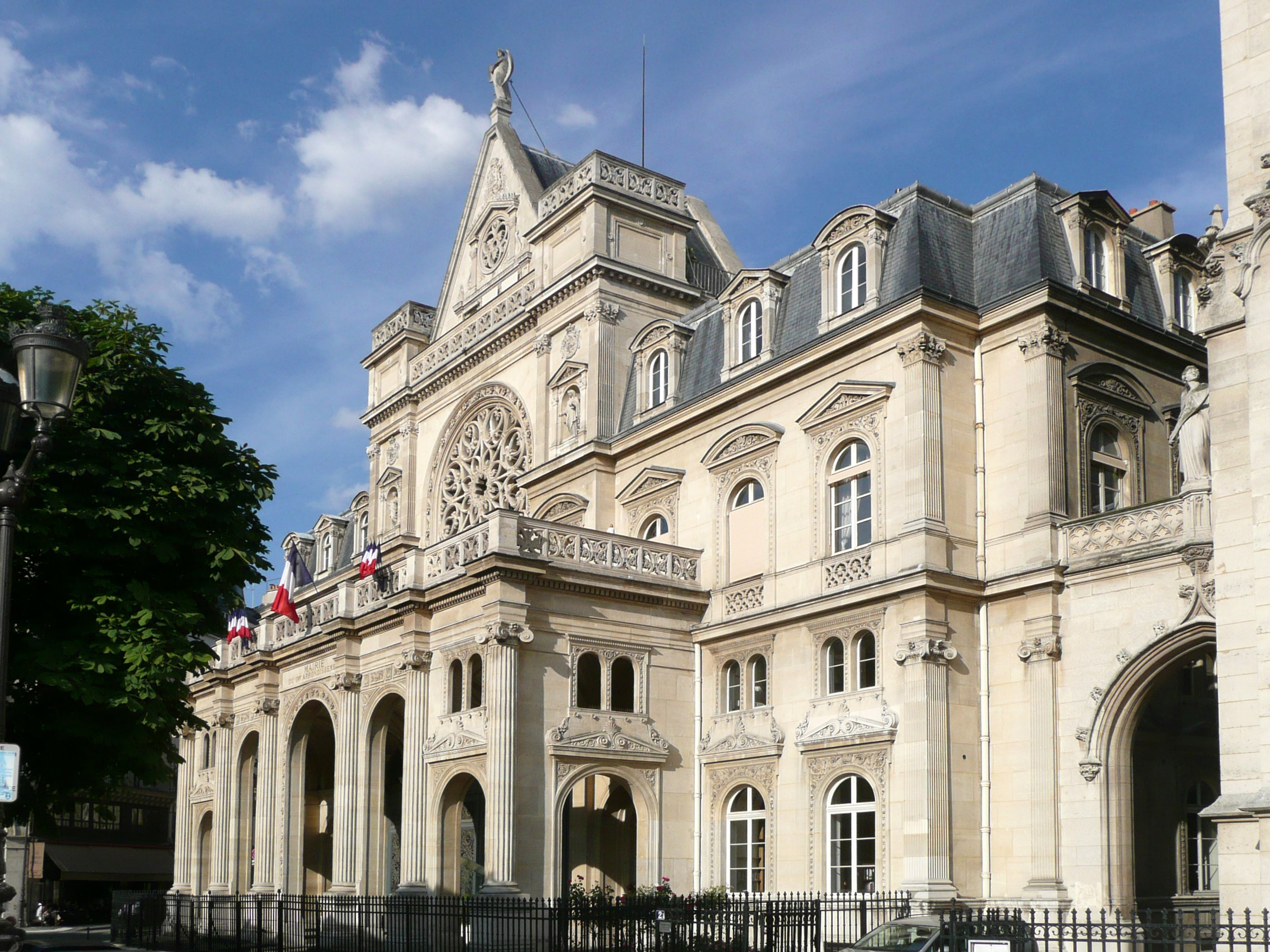
1st arrondissement town hall.

If the last residence is unknown, the law of August 10, 1917, requires that the following civil records be transcribed in the 1st arrondissement:

- Birth and death records registered at sea,
- Judicial death declarations,
- Records related to soldiers and sailors under certain special circumstances,
- Divorce judgments or rulings, when the marriage was celebrated in a territory occupied by the enemy.

=== Modern era ===
The arrondissement town halls have deposited their civil records prior to 1903 at the Paris Archives. While it only keeps its records, the 1st arrondissement town hall centralizes requests requiring searches across all arrondissements.

In 1973, the City of Paris made an agreement with the Archdiocese to deposit duplicates of its registers of Catholic rites, including baptisms and marriages performed in all Parisian parishes from 1793 to 1899. Deposits continued until 1909. The other copies remain preserved in the parishes.

In June 1974, the duplicates of reconstructed records, along with numerous judicial archives, were destroyed in a fire at the Montlignon fort (Val-d'Oise), where they had been stored.

With original civil records starting only in 1860, Paris is one of the few cities in France where tracing family origins is particularly challenging. The 1871 disaster underscored the importance of preserving and protecting archives, which is now facilitated by digitization.

The Paris Archives have gradually made the following records available online:

- The civil status records from 1860 to 1902 and the index of reconstructed records prior to 1860 (December 15, 2009).
- The ten-year tables of births, marriages, and deaths from 1903 to 1932; the annual tables (Note: Between 1933 and 1954, only annual tables were kept in Paris. Decennial tables were no longer compiled.) of marriages from 1933 to 1939; the annual tables of deaths from 1933 to 1954; and the ten-year tables of marriages and deaths from 1955 to 1974 (January 12, 2016).
- Birth records from 1903; marriage records from 1903 to 1940.
- Death records from 1903 to 1986; ten-year tables of deaths from 1975 to 1984.
- Marriage records from 1941 to 1945; annual tables of deaths for 1985 and 1986.
- Reconstructed civil status records prior to 1860:
  - Birth records (November 2020).
  - Marriage records (January 2021).
  - Death records (November 2021).

Currently, all old Parisian civil records are accessible online.

== Accessible documents (as of May 2023) ==
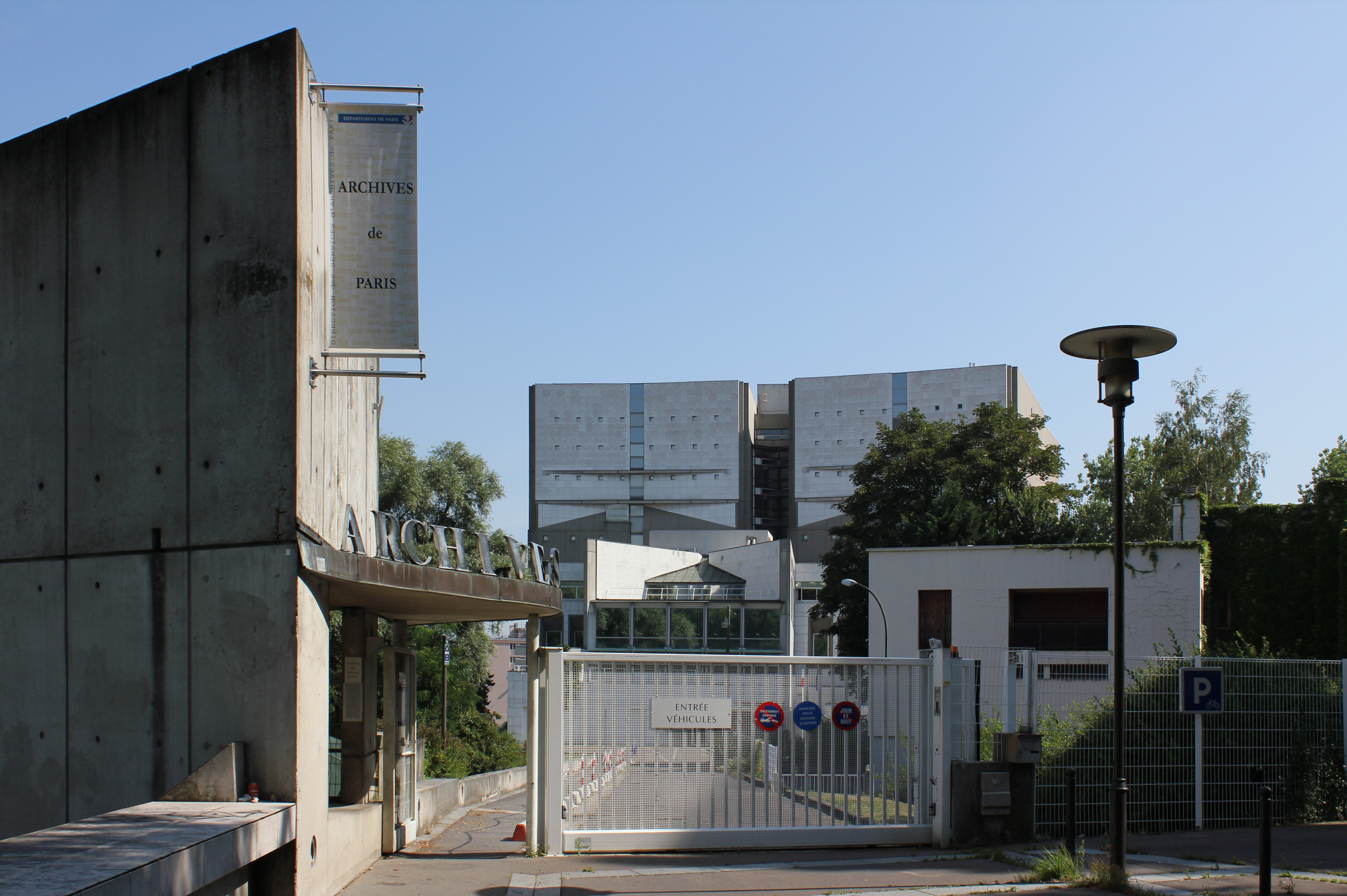
The Archives de Paris building at 18 boulevard Sérurier.

- CIVIL RECORDS
  - Held in the 20 arrondissement town halls:
    - Births from 1925 to the present.
    - Marriages from 1948 to the present.
    - Deaths from 1987 to the present.
  - Available at the Paris Archives:
    - Before 1860:
      - Births, marriages, and deaths from the 16th century to 1859—alphabetical-chronological indexes and records of the so-called “reconstructed” civil status from former parishes of Paris, the 12 former arrondissements, and fully or partially annexed communes in 1860.
    - From 1860 onwards:
      - Decennial tables:
        - Births, marriages, and deaths up to 1932.
        - Marriages from 1955 to 1974.
        - Deaths from 1955 to 1984.
      - Annual tables:
        - Marriages from 1933 to 1954 (only record numbers are listed).
        - Deaths from 1933 to 1954 (only record numbers are listed) and from 1985–1986.
      - Records:
        - Births up to 1922.
        - Marriages up to 1947.
        - Deaths up to 1986.
  - Available on-site at the Paris Archives:
    - Records from the second reconstruction (V.5.E).
    - 29 registers of parish or civil status records from the 18th and 19th centuries not destroyed in 1871 (V.6.E 1–29).
    - Births from 1923 and 1924.
- CATHOLIC RECORDS
  - Baptisms, marriages, and burials from the 16th century to 1792—about 50 parish registers, mostly containing excerpts, preserved at the National Archives and the National Library.
  - Baptisms, marriages, and burials from all Parisian churches from 1793 to 1909 (with gaps):
    - First copies preserved in parishes (a single register for burials).
    - Second copies (baptisms and marriages only) deposited at the Paris Archives by the Archdiocese.
  - Baptisms, marriages, and burials from all Parisian churches from 1910 to the present—preserved in parishes or at the Archdiocese (so-called “diocesan” archives).

== Substitute sources ==
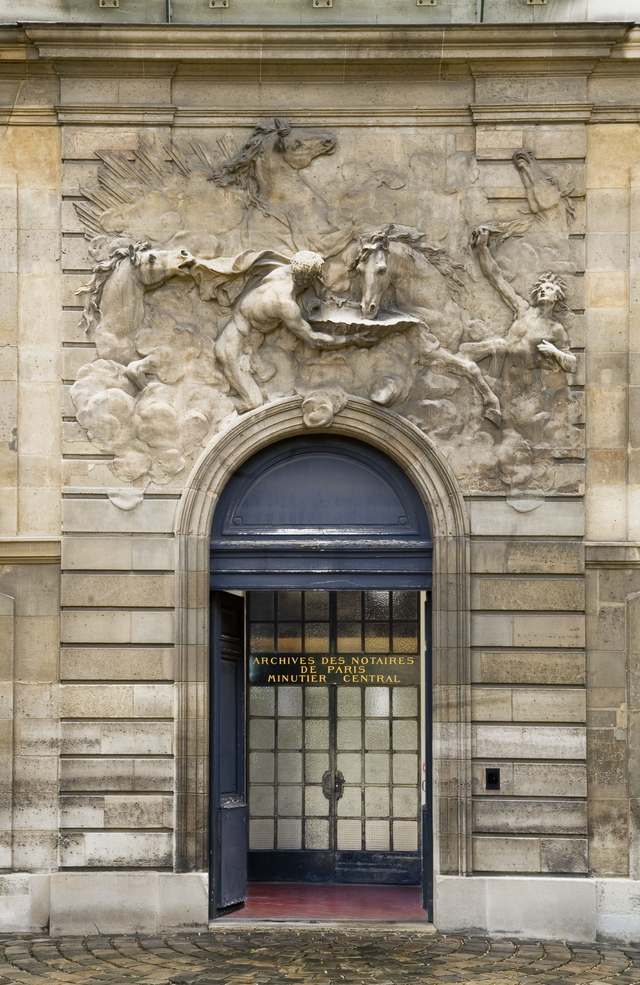
National Archives. Courtyard of the Horses of the Sun. Entrance to the Central Notary Office of Paris.

=== Notarial records ===
The primary source for compensating gaps in Parisian civil records is the "Minutier central des notaires de Paris." Established in 1932 under the law of March 14, 1928, this repository allows notaries in the Seine department to deposit records over 125 years old at the National Archives. It includes 100 million records, spanning from the late 15th century to the early 20th century, sourced from 122 Parisian notarial offices, numbered I to CXXII. Documents such as marriage contracts, wills, post-mortem inventories, and various other contracts offer insights into Parisian daily life since the late Middle Ages.

While these documents help address gaps in civil records prior to 1860, they are also valuable for researchers studying local, social, demographic, or epidemiological history.

=== Assisted children ===
The Paris Archives hold registers for the admission of foundlings, abandoned children, orphans, and rescued minors, referred to as “assisted children.” These records span from 1742 to 1924, with a gap between 1748 and 1754. Available online, they provide registration numbers that allow access to the admission files on-site.

=== Military archives ===
The Defence Historical Service (SHD), located at the Château de Vincennes, preserves military personnel files. Many of these files contain copies, sometimes complete, of Parisian civil records. The online databases include name indexes for officer career records. On-site, one can consult muster rolls for all army units, which record each soldier’s date and place of birth, residence, and the names of parents and spouses.

The Paris Archives also retain documents on military recruitment in the Seine department, including alphabetical tables (1872–1940) and muster rolls (1887–1921). These archives are accessible online.

=== Elections ===
The Paris Archives store two sets of records for male voters. The first covers voters in the capital from 1860 to 1870. The second lists voters in the Seine department whose registration status was modified (added or removed) between 1921 and 1939. These records are accessible online.

=== Census records ===
Population censuses, administratively called "enumerations," are valuable genealogical resources, as their name lists help reconstruct families sharing the same residence. Censuses were conducted roughly every five years, except during wartime. Paris only organized four censuses—in 1926, 1931, 1936, and 1946. These records are available online via the Paris Archives website, except for the 1946 census, which can only be viewed on-site.

=== Legion of honor ===
The Léonore database allows online access to a large portion of files for members of the National Order of the Legion of Honor. Many birth records predating 1860 are included, helping to fill gaps in Parisian civil records.

=== Hospitals ===
The Assistance Publique–Hôpitaux de Paris (AP-HP) preserves numerous archives, some dating back to the Middle Ages. The oldest hospitalization registers—approximately one million pages—have been digitized and made available online. “Population registers” document admissions, discharges, births, and deaths. Each hospital maintains two types of annual records: alphabetical indexes to locate individuals and chronological registers specifying civil status, reasons for admission, and, in some cases, causes of death.

=== Cemeteries ===
Parisian cemeteries keep burial registers, with the oldest dating back to 1786. These records can be viewed online on the Paris Archives website for burials between 1804 and 1970.

=== Other Sources ===
Several publications contain copies of Parisian parish and civil records:

- Jal, Auguste (1867). Dictionnaire critique de biographie et d'histoire [Critical Dictionary of Biography and History] (in French). Éditions Plon.
- Piot, Eugène (1873). État civil de quelques artistes français [Marital status of some French artists] (in French). Paris: Librairie Pagnerre.
- de Brossard, Yolande (1965). Musiciens de Paris 1535-1792 [Musicians of Paris 1535-1792] (in French). Paris: Picard.

== Bibliography ==
- Gasnault, François (2007). Sur les traces de vos ancêtres à Paris [On the trail of your ancestors in Paris] (in French). Paris: Archives de Paris.
- Abensur-Hazan, Laurence (2011). Recherche ses ancêtres à Paris [Search for ancestors in Paris] (in French). Paris: Autrement généalogies.
- Barroux, Maurice (1898). Les sources de l'ancien état civil parisien [Parisian civil registry sources] (in French). Paris: Honoré Champion Éditeur. Archived from the original on October 31, 2020.
- de Blaignerie, Henri; Dangin, Édouard (2009). Paris incendié pendant la Commune - 1871 [Paris set on fire during the Commune - 1871] (in French). Paris: Les Éditions du Mécène.
- de Brossard, Yolande (1965). Musiciens de Paris 1535-1792, actes d'état civil d'après le fichier Laborde de la Bibliothèque nationale [Musiciens de Paris 1535-1792, civil status records from the Bibliothèque nationale's Laborde file] (in French). Paris: Éditions Picard.
- de Chastellux, Henri Paul César (1875). Notes prises aux archives de l'état-civil de Paris, avenue Victoria, 4, brûlées le 24 mai 1871 [Notes taken from the archives of the Paris registry office, avenue Victoria, 4, burnt on May 24, 1871] (in French). Paris: Dumoulin.
- Delsalle, Paul (2009). Histoires de familles, les registres paroissiaux et d'état civil, du Moyen Âge à nos jours, démographie et généalogie [Family histories, parish and civil registers, from the Middle Ages to the present day, demography and genealogy] (in French). Besançon: Presses universitaires de Franche-Comté.
- Fierro, Alfred (1996). Histoire et dictionnaire de Paris [History and dictionary of Paris] (in French). Paris: Éditions Robert-Laffont.
- Auguste, Jal (1872). Dictionnaire critique de biographie et d'histoire [Critical Dictionary of Biography and History] (in French). Paris: Éditions Plon.
- Piot, Eugène (1873). État civil de quelques artistes français [Marital status of some French artists] (in French). Paris: Librairie Pagnerre.
