= Gilbert Génébrard =

French Benedictine exegete, orientalist and archbishop (1535-1597)

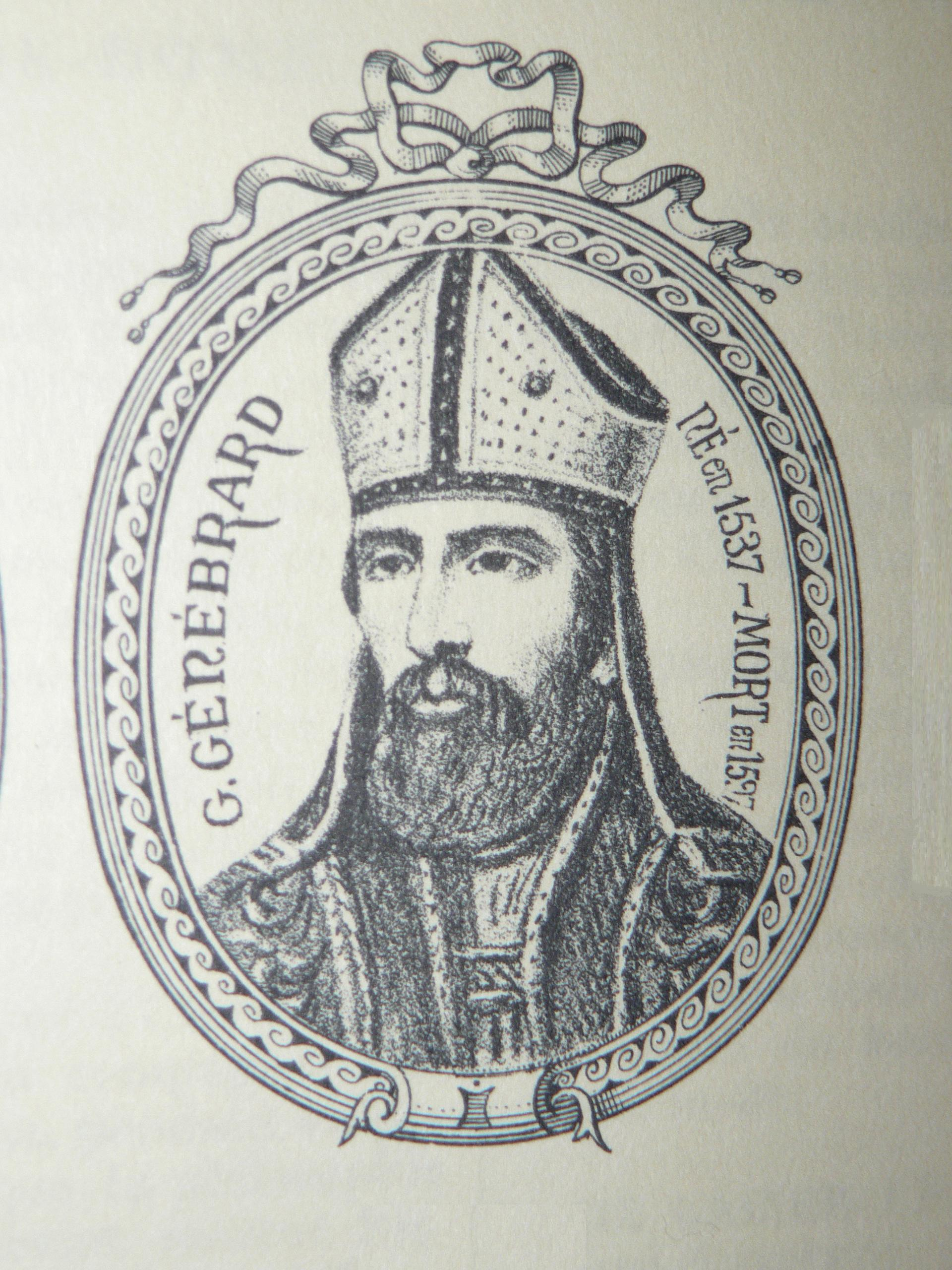
Gilbert Génébrard

Gilbert Génébrard (12 December 1535, in Riom, Puy-de-Dôme – 16 February 1597, in Semur, Côte-d'Or) was a French Benedictine exegete and Orientalist.

In his early youth he entered the Cluniac monastery of Mozac near Riom, later continued his studies at the monastery of Saint-Allyre in Clermont, and completed them at the College de Navarre in Paris, where he obtained the doctorate in theology in 1562. A year later he was appointed professor of Hebrew and exegesis at the Collège Royal and at the same time held the office of prior at Saint-Denis de La Chartre in Paris.

He was one of the most learned professors at the university and through his numerous and erudite exegetical works became famous throughout Europe. Among his scholars at the Collège Royal was St. Francis de Sales, who in his later life considered it an honour to have had Génebrard as professor (Traite de l'Amour de Dieu, XI, 11).

About 1578 he went to Rome where he was honourably received by Pope Sixtus V and stood in close relation to Cardinal Allen, Baronius, Bosio, and other ecclesiastical celebrities. Upon his return, in 1588, he became one of the chief supporters of the Holy League in France. On 10 May 1591 he was appointed Archbishop of Aix by Pope Gregory XIII, but accepted this dignity only after the express command of the pope. He was consecrated by Archbishop Beaton of Glasgow on 10 April 1592. As archbishop he remained a zealous leaguer, even after Henry IV of France became reconciled with the Church in July, 1593.

The new king, however, became daily more popular and gained over to his side most of the Catholics. Génebrard saw that further opposition would be useless and, on 15 November 1593, sent his submission to the king. This, however, did not prevent the Provençal Parliament from banishing him on 26 September 1596. For a short time he stayed at Avignon, but being allowed by the king to return, he retired to the priory of Semur, which he held in commendam.

== Works ==
Génébrard translated many rabbinic writings into Latin, wrote one of the best commentaries on the Psalms: "Psalmi Davidis vulgatâ editione, calendario hebraeo, syro, graeco, latino, hymnis, argumentis, et commentariis, etc. instructi" (Paris, 1577); is the author of "De Sanctâ Trinitate" (Paris, 1569); "Joel Propheta cum chaldæâ paraphrasi et commentariis", etc. (Paris, 1563); "Chronographiae libri IV" (Paris 1580), and numerous other works. He also edited the works of Origen (Paris, 1574).
