= Church of Saint-Jean-le-Rond, Paris =

Church of Saint-John-le-Rond, Paris
- Église Saint-Jean-le-Rond de Paris
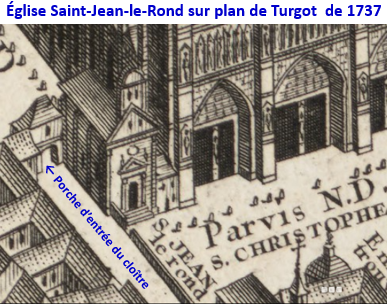
- Church of Saint-John-le-Rond, Paris, on the Turgot map of Paris (18th c.)
- Church of Saint-John-le-Rond, Paris
- 48.8535°N 2.349°E
- Location: 4th arrondissement of Paris
- Country: France
- Denomination: Roman Catholic

Administration
- Archdiocese: Roman Catholic Archdiocese of Paris

The Church of Saint-Jean-le-Rond, Paris (Église Saint-Jean-le-Rond de Paris) was a small church originally attached to the north side of the Cathedral of Notre-Dame de Paris near the west front, and close to the entrance of the cloister. It was built earlier than Notre-Dame, at about the same time as the church which preceded Notre-Dame, the Cathedral of Saint-Etienne. It was dedicated to John the Baptist, and was used primarily as a baptistry. It survived centuries longer than the Cathedral of Saint Etienne, but was finally demolished in the early 18th century to make room for a new street, the rue du Cloître-Notre-Dame.

== History ==
According to some early sources, such as the Abbot Leboeuf, the original baptistry was located next to the Seine, but more recent research suggests that it was always at the same site of Saint-Le-Rond. It was built close to the middle of the lower north aisle of the Cathedral of Saint Etienne, the traditional place for a baptistry in Gaul in late antiquity and in the early Middle Ages. Like other baptistries of the period, it was square, with a central plan. Baptism of adults by total immersion was the tradition at the time, and the large fonts of the cathedral were located in baptistry. Its existence is recorded in 881, when the remains of Saint Germain were brought there to protect them from the ravages of Norman invaders.

In the 12th century, the church is recorded as having two priests, who were in charge preaching to servants of the chanoines, or canons, and the sergeants who maintained the cathedral, as well as to the non-clerical staff who lived in the cloisters. In 1296, three deacons and three sub-deacons were added to the churches' staff, as the neighbouring cathedral grew in size and importance.

Later, in the 13th century, after the demolition of the Cathedral of Saint Etienne and the construction of Notre-Dame de Paris, the church was rebuilt in rectangular form. Its west front was exactly aligned with that of the neighbouring cathedral, as is clearly illustrated by a painting of the Master of St. Giles, "The Life of a Bishop-Saint", now in the National Gallery of Art in Washington, D.C. which shows details of the facades of Notre-Dame and St. Jean behind the main figures (see gallery below).

The new church was rectangular rather than square, and had a triangular gable on the west front, a console with archivolts, and columns whose capitals were decorated with sculptures of leaves gathered into large balls. This decoration was typical of churches in the last two decades of the 13th century. Fragments of the capitals were found in the excavation of Notre-Dame in the 19th century, and are now on display in the National Museum of the Middle Ages in Paris.

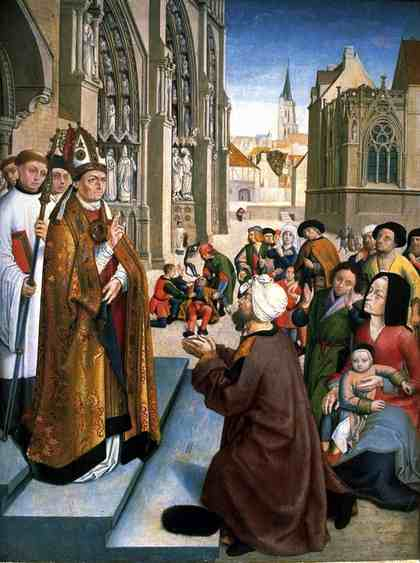
Saint-Jean-le-Rond and Notre-Dame on the left, with the old Hôtel-Dieu, Paris in the background.Episodes from the Life of a Bishop-Saint, by the Master of Saint Giles (c. 1500)

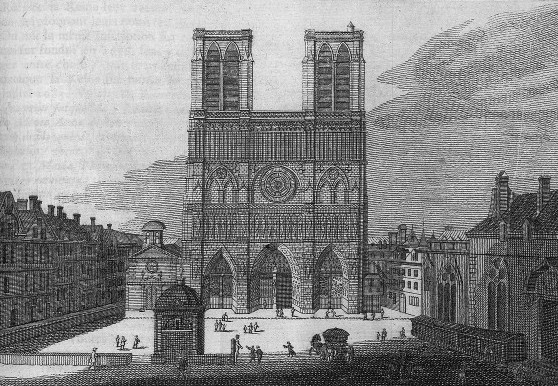
The facade of Notre-Dame in the early 18th century, with the church of Saint-Jean-le-Rond visible on its left side

In the 17h century, further modifications were made. The old facade was replaced by a new facade in the Louis XIV style with classical features, including doric columns, a fronton with three statues, a modest rose window, and a small bell tower.

By the 18th century, even though major modifications had been made to the church, it was in a serious state of dilapidation. In 1748, it was finally decided to tear down the building. Another motivation was a program to reduce the number of small parishes in the Ile-de-la-Cité, Therefore, the functions of the curé, the baptistry and the canons were transferred to another church east of the cathedral, Saint-Denis-du-Pas. In 1751, the church was torn down, and its material was reused in the reconstruction of the portal of the cloister by Germain Boffrand in 1751.

== Bibliography (in French) ==
- Fierro, Alfred (1996). Histoire et dictionnaire de Paris. Robert Laffont. ISBN 2-221--07862-4.
