= Saint-Josse, Paris =

Demolished church in Paris, France

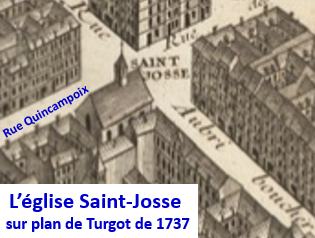
The Church of Saint-Josse on the 1737 Turgot map of Paris

Saint-Josse (French pronunciation: [sɛ̃.ʒɔs]) was a church in Paris, France.

== Location ==
The church was located in the corner of Rue Quincampoix and Rue Aubry-le-Boucher.

== History ==
The houses between Rue Aubry-le-Boucher, Rue Saint-Merry and Rue Saint-Jacques-la-Boucherie, affiliated with the Saint-Laurent parish, were isolated from Saint-Laurent's church by the wall of Philip II Augustus built around 1200. Thus, an additional church was built in 1235. It was made a full parish by the Bishop of Paris Renaud de Corbeil in 1260.

Around 1300, the estimated parish population was 1,020 inhabitants in 30 houses aligned on two streets.

The Church of Saint Josse, used by the gardeners' fellowship, was re-built in 1679. It was closed in 1791, sold and demolished in 1792. The small building was shown on the 1737 Turgot map of Paris.
