= Saint-Pierre-des-Arcis Church =

Former French church

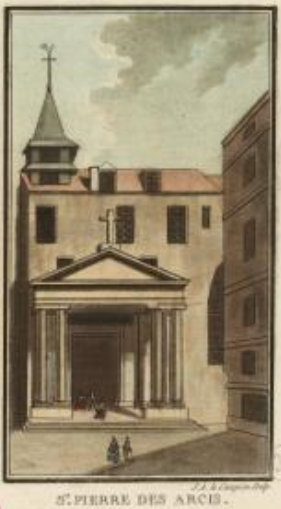
- Interactive map of Saint-Pierre-des-Arcis Church
- Location: Paris, France
- Coordinates: 48°21′19″N 2°20′47″E
- Type: Church
- Dedicated to: Archdiocese of Paris
- State of preservation: demolished or destroyed

Saint-Pierre-des-Arcis was a former Catholic church located on the Île de la Cité in Paris. Constructed in the 15th century, it was demolished at the end of the 18th century.

== Location ==
The church forecourt formed a small square opening onto Rue de la Vieille-Draperief. The building was bordered on the east by Rue Saint-Pierre-des-Arcis and on the west by a passage leading to the apse of Saint-Barthélemy Church.

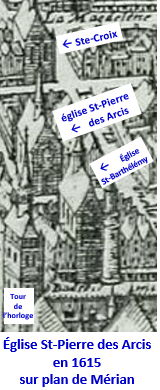
The Church of Saint-Pierre-des-Arcis on Mérian's map.

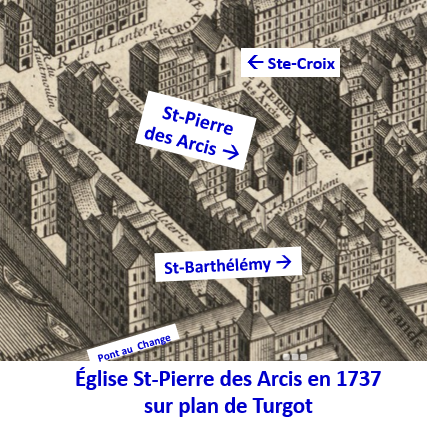
The Church of Saint-Pierre-des-Arcis on Turgot's map.

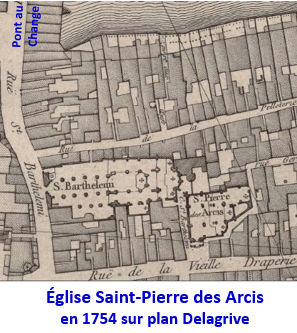
The Church of Saint-Pierre-des-Arcis in 1754 on Delagrive's map.

== History ==
The church was founded in 926 by Theudon, viscount of Paris, on the site of a ruined chapel dedicated to Saint Peter that depended on the monastery of Saint-Éloi. The origin of its name is uncertain; Arcis is commonly linked to the Latin arcisterium, meaning “monastery.” A bull of Pope Innocent II refers to the church as Ecclesia Sancti Petri de Arsionibus.

In 1130, the church was established as a parish of modest size, similar to other parishes on the Île de la Cité. Its territory included houses east of Rue de la Barillerie and west of Rue de la Vieille-Draperie, with an estimated population of about one thousand inhabitants. The parish was merged with that of Saint-Martial in 1722.

In 1789, during the confiscation of Church property, Saint-Pierre-des-Arcis remained one of the 52 urban parishes of the Diocese of Paris. Its priest, Abbé Roch-Damien Dubertrand, appointed in 1774, declined to take the oath to the Civil Constitution of the Clergy and was removed from office in January 1791.

In February 1791, a series of decrees issued by the National Constituent Assembly, following a proposal from the Paris city authorities, transferred the parish status of Saint-Pierre-des-Arcis, along with that of the other churches on the Île de la Cité, (Note: The ten parish churches on the Île de la Cité are Saint-Barthélemy, Saint-Germain-le-Vieux-en-la-Cité, Saint-Jean-Baptiste-Saint Denis, Saint-Landry, Saint-Pierre-aux-Arcis, Saint-Pierre-aux-Bœufs, Sainte-Croix-en-la-Cité, Sainte-Madeleine-en-la-Cité, Sainte-Marine, and Sainte-Chapelle-Basse (Abbé Delarc, Id.).) to Notre-Dame Cathedral. The building was subsequently repurposed as a bell depot for the production of copper coinage.

On 13 Ventôse Year V, the State sold the building with the requirement that the purchaser open a planned street between Rue de la Vieille-Draperie and the Seine embankments. The church was subsequently demolished, and Rue du Marché-aux-Fleurs was opened in 1812.

== Description ==
The original church comprised a nave measuring 13.5 by 6 meters, terminating in a semicircular apse and accompanied by a south aisle. It was reconstructed around 1424 with a four-bay central nave flanked by two aisles, the southern aisle extending further than the northern one.

Saint-Pierre Square, which adjoined the church, was replaced after 1522 by two chapels. The portal was rebuilt in 1702 by the architect Jean-François Lanchenu.

== See also ==
- Île de la Cité
- History of Paris
