= Sainte-Geneviève-des-Ardents, Paris =

Former church located in Paris, France

Coordinates: 48°51′13″N 2°20′53″E

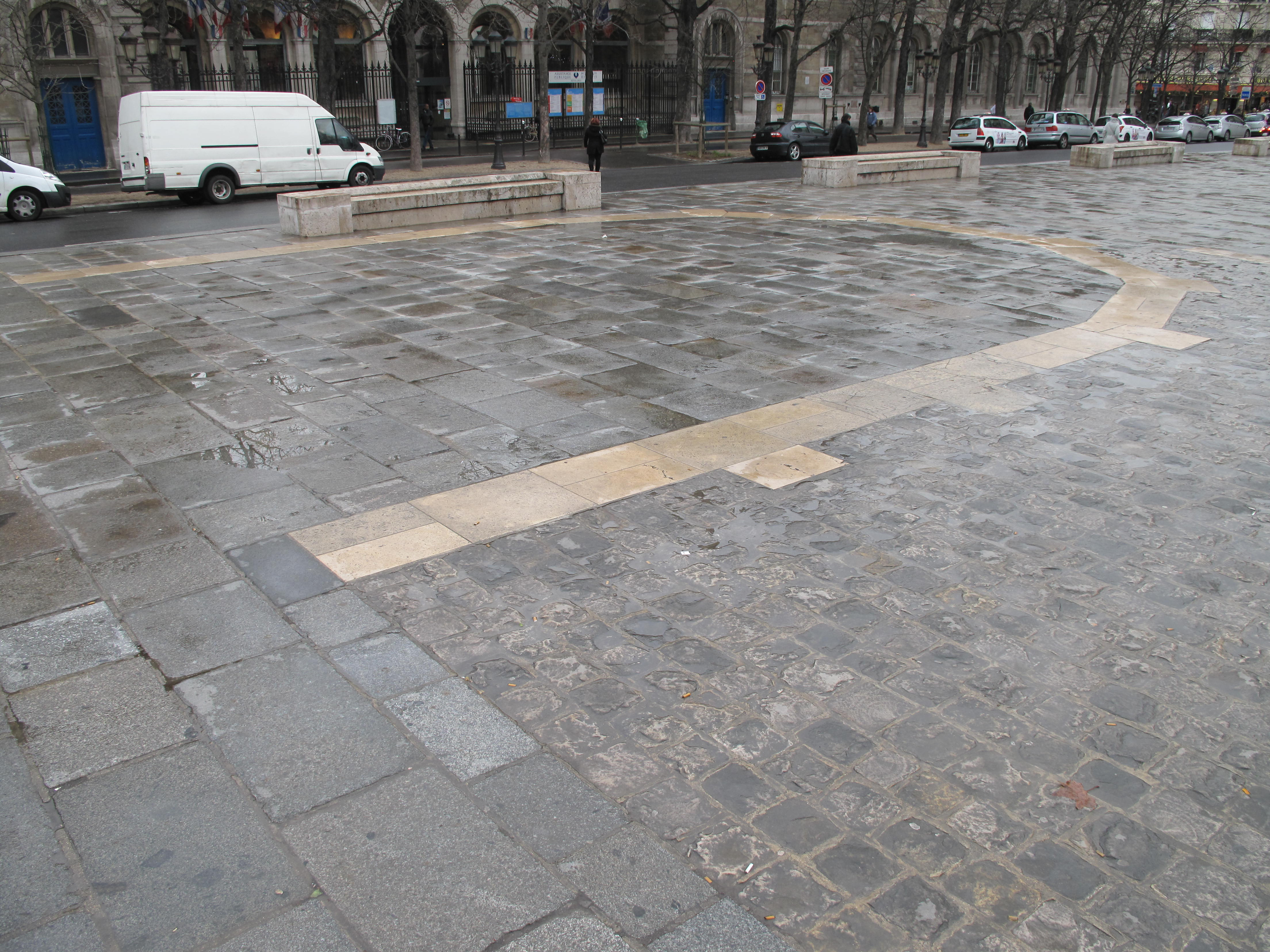
The outline of the former church at Parvis Notre-Dame – Place Jean-Paul-II.

Sainte-Geneviève-des-Ardents (French pronunciation: [sɛ̃t ʒənvjɛv dez‿aʁdɑ̃]), known as Sainte-Geneviève-la-Petite in the Middle Ages, was a church located at present-day Parvis Notre-Dame – Place Jean-Paul-II in the Île de la Cité in Paris, France. It is dedicated to Saint Genevieve, the miracles imputed to whom included "the cessation of a horrible plague, called the mal ardent, which desolated Paris in the reign of Louis le Gros".

== History ==
A Sainte-Geneviève chapel, under the authority of the abbey of the same name, was attested in the 9th century. It was mentioned as a proper parish from 1128, which makes it the oldest attested parish of La Cité quarter.

The church was re-built in the 15th, in part thanks to the donations of bookseller Nicolas Flamel. Flamel was represented in a niche next to the portal. Theologian and casuist Jean Pontas became the vicar of the church in 1666.

The Sainte-Geneviève and Saint-Christophe parishes, both situated at present-day Parvis Notre-Dame – Place Jean-Paul-II, were suppressed in 1747 and merged with the parish of Sainte-Madeleine. The church of Sainte-Geneviève-des-Ardents was destroyed in January 1747 to enable the extension works of the Hôpital des Enfants-Trouvés. The walls of the church were excavated when the archaeological crypt was built. Now, the outline of the former building is shown by a lighter tiling on Parvis Notre-Dame.
