= Saint-Hilaire, Paris =

Former church in Paris, France

Church of Saint-Hilaire
- Église Saint-Hilaire (Saint-Hilaire-du-Mont)
- Location within Paris

Religion
- Affiliation: Roman Catholic

Location
- Municipality: Paris
- Country: France
- Interactive map of Church of Saint-Hilaire
- Coordinates: 48°50′53″N 2°20′49″E

Architecture
- Completed: 11th century
- Demolished: 1807

The Church of Saint-Hilaire (French pronunciation: [sɛ̃.t‿i.lɛʁ]) or Saint-Hilaire-du-Mont (French: [sɛ̃.t‿i.lɛʁ dy mɔ̃]) is a ruined 12th-century church in Paris, France, active until the French Revolution.

== History ==
An original oratory was built on the site in the 11th century. The site is located on Montagne Sainte-Geneviève on a plot that belonged to the canons of Saint-Marcel.

In 1158, the building was attested as a parish chapel dedicated to Saint Hilary. The small parish had numerous bookshops —up to 14 on Rue Saint-Hilaire in 1571.

During the French Revolution, the church was closed in 1790 and the parish was suppressed in 1793. It was sold as a national good in 1796 and demolished in 1807.

== Architecture ==
A drawing of the church shows that the bell tower was made of carpentry with no masonry.

== Ruins ==
The ruins of the church are located at 2 Rue Valette and 1bis Rue de Lanneau in the 5th arrondissement of Paris.

The few remains include a column with a capital and a part of an arch. They can be seen in a small courtyard that can be reached from 1bis Rue de Lanneau near the corner of the Rue Vallette.

== Bibliography ==
- Bos, Agnès (2003). Les églises flamboyantes de Paris, XVe-XVIe siècles (in French). Picard.
- Fleury, Michel; Billaud, Bernard; Dormann, Geneviève (1994). Si le roi m'avait donné Paris sa grand'ville (in French). Maisonneuve et Larose. ISBN 9782706811418.
- Friedmann, Adrien (1959). Paris, ses rues, ses paroisses du Moyen-Age à la Révolution (in French).
- Hillairet, Jacques (1985). Dictionnaire historique des rues de Paris (in French).
- Plongeron, Bernard; Pietri, Luce (1987). Le Diocèse de Paris (in French). Vol. 1. Beauchesne. ISBN 2701011329.
