= Saint-Pierre-du-Gros-Caillou =

Church in Paris, France

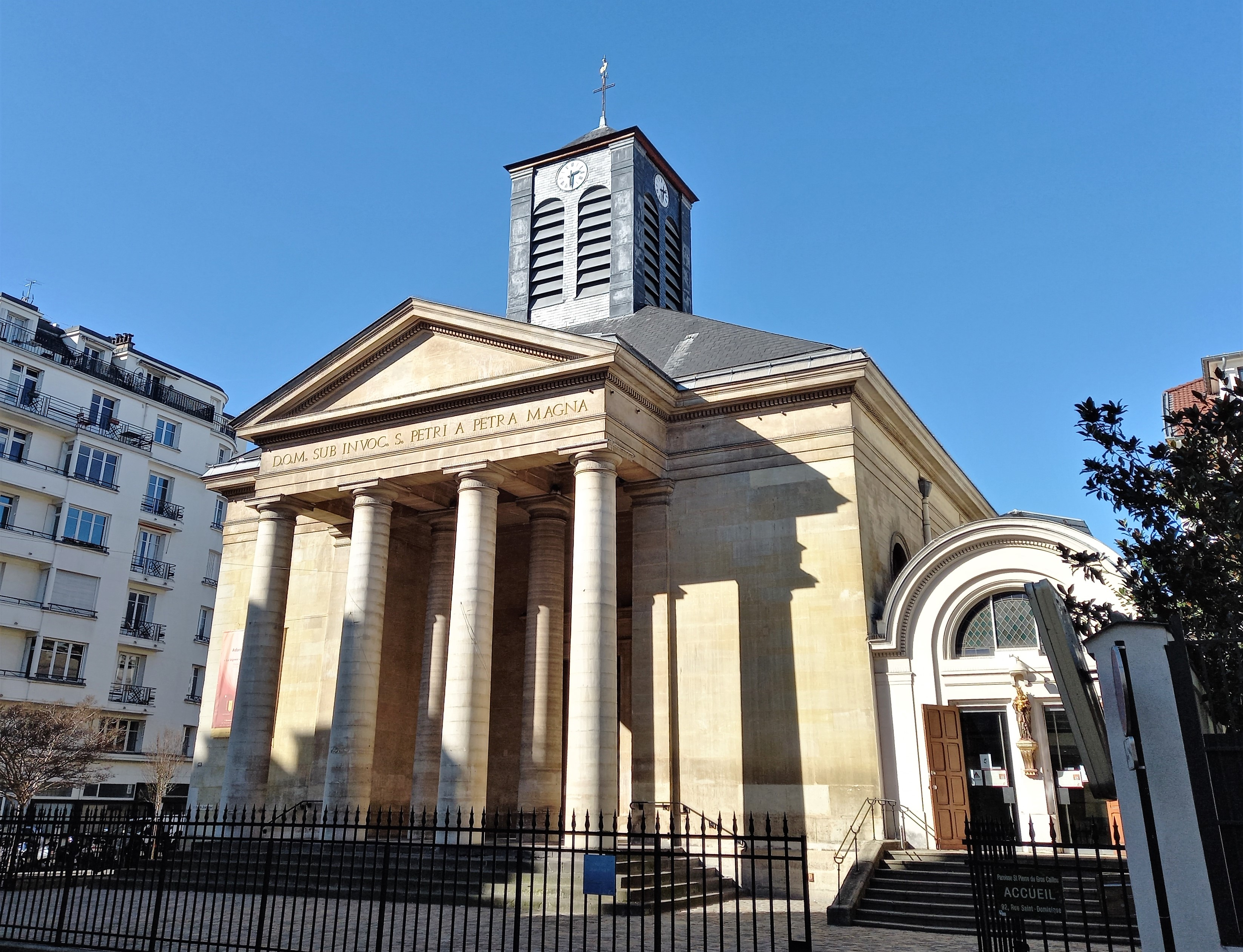

Religion
- Affiliation: Catholic Church
- Province: Archdiocese of Paris
- Region: Île-de-France
- Rite: Roman Rite
- Status: Active

Location
- Location: 52 Rue Dominique, 7th arrondissement, Paris
- State: France
- Interactive map of Saint-Pierre-du-Gros-Caillou
- Coordinates: 48.8597°N 2.3052°E

Architecture
- Type: Parish church
- Style: Neoclassical architecture
- Completed: 1822
- Direction of façade: South
- Monument historique
- Designated: 1914
- Reference no.: PA00085798
- Denomination: Église

Website
- www.paroissesaintroch.fr

Saint-Pierre-du-Gros-Caillou is a Roman Catholic parish church located at 52 Rue Dominique in the 7th arrondissement of Paris, completed in 1733. It takes its name from a large boulder, or Caillou, which marked the limit between the parishes of the abbeys of Saint-Germain des Prés and Sainte-Genevièce.

== History ==
The population of the 7th arrondissement grew rapidly in the late 17th and early 18th centuries, overcrowding the main parish church, Saint Sulpice. A new church was proposed as early as 1652, but the construction did not begin until 1733, when the first stone of the new church was laid. As the neighbourhood continued to grow, it was rebuilt in 1755 following the designs of the young architect Jean-François Chalgrin, whose future works would include the Luxembourg Palace and the first design for the Arc de Triomphe When the French Revolution broke out, the church was still unfinished, and incomplete structure wa demolished.

In 1822, a new church with the same name was begun on the same site. It was Designed. by Etienne-Hippolyte Godde, the very prolific architect of the city of Paris from 1813 to 1830, who built or rebuilt thirty churches, as well as the entry to the Pere Lachaise cemetery, and later planned the Arc de Triomphe.

The remains of Jean-Sylvain Bailly, the first mayor of Paris in 1789, are placed beneath the dallage of the church. In 1854, the confessional, designed by Victor Baltard, was added to the church.

In 1971, the architect Paul Vimond, chief architect for civil buildings and national palaces, along with architect Claude Petit, designed and built the Chapel of the Virgin.

== Exterior ==
The exterior expresses neo-classical simplicity. The peristyle on the facade has Doric columns, and there is no decoration on the peristyle over the entrance.

== Interior ==
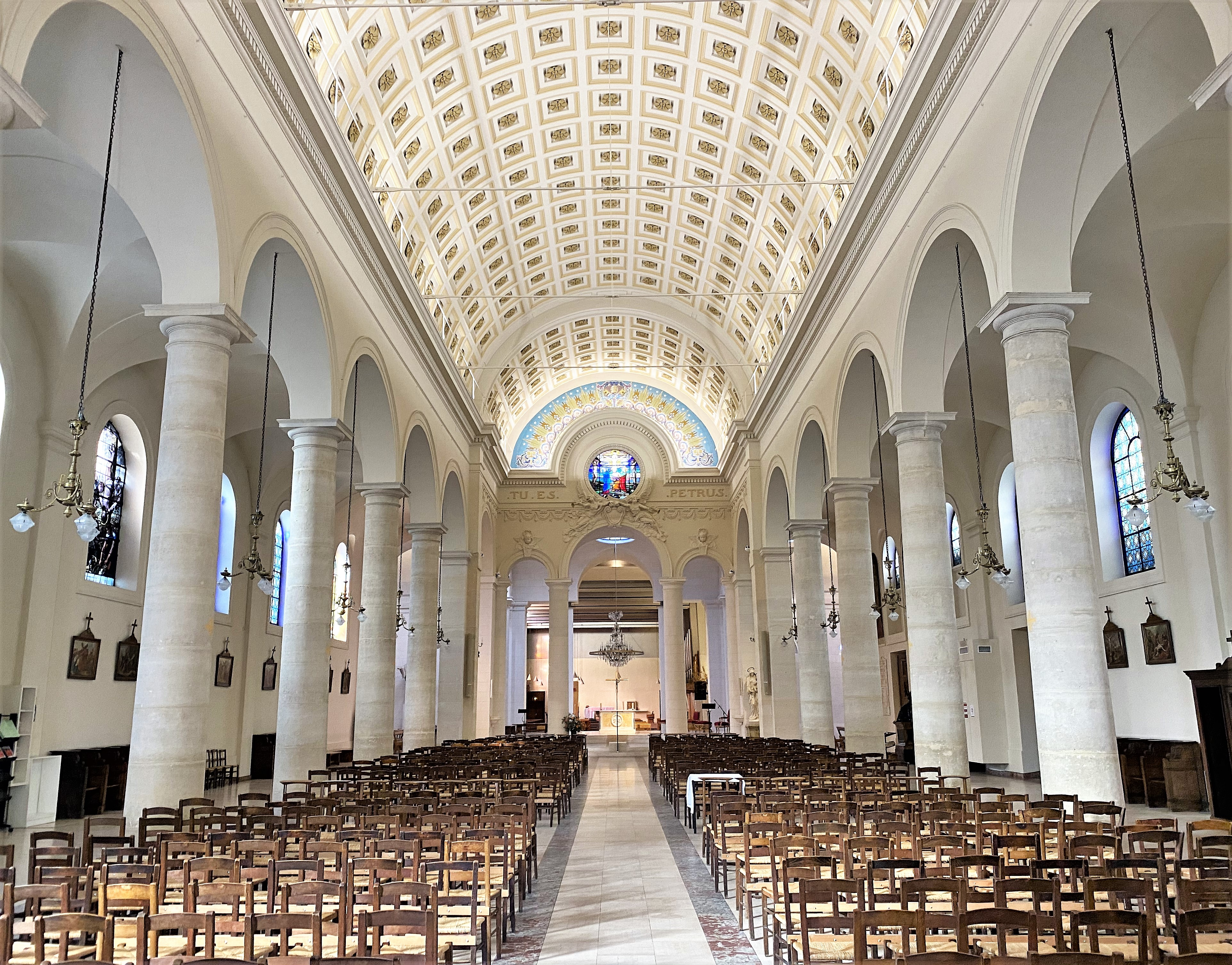
The nave

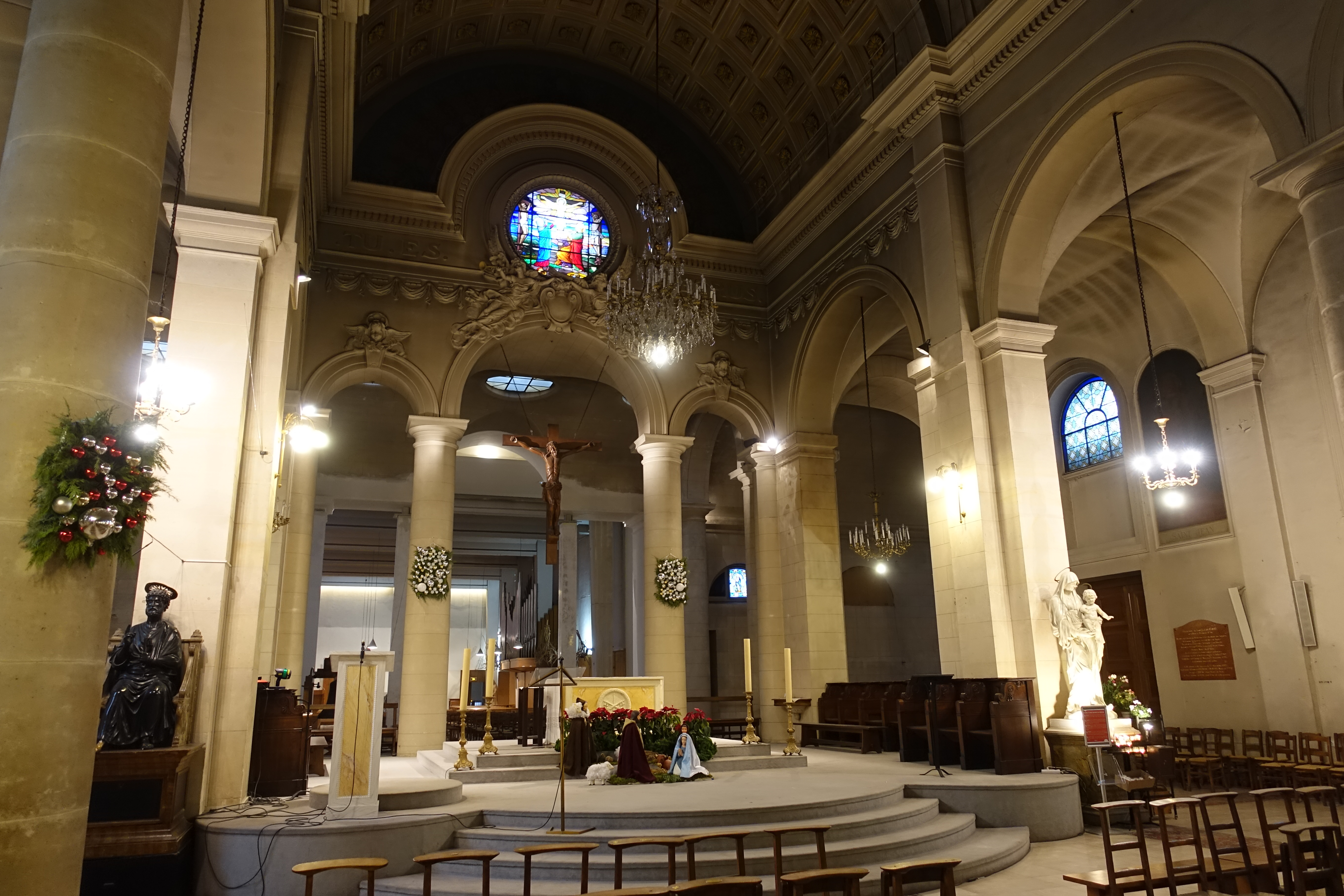
The Choir

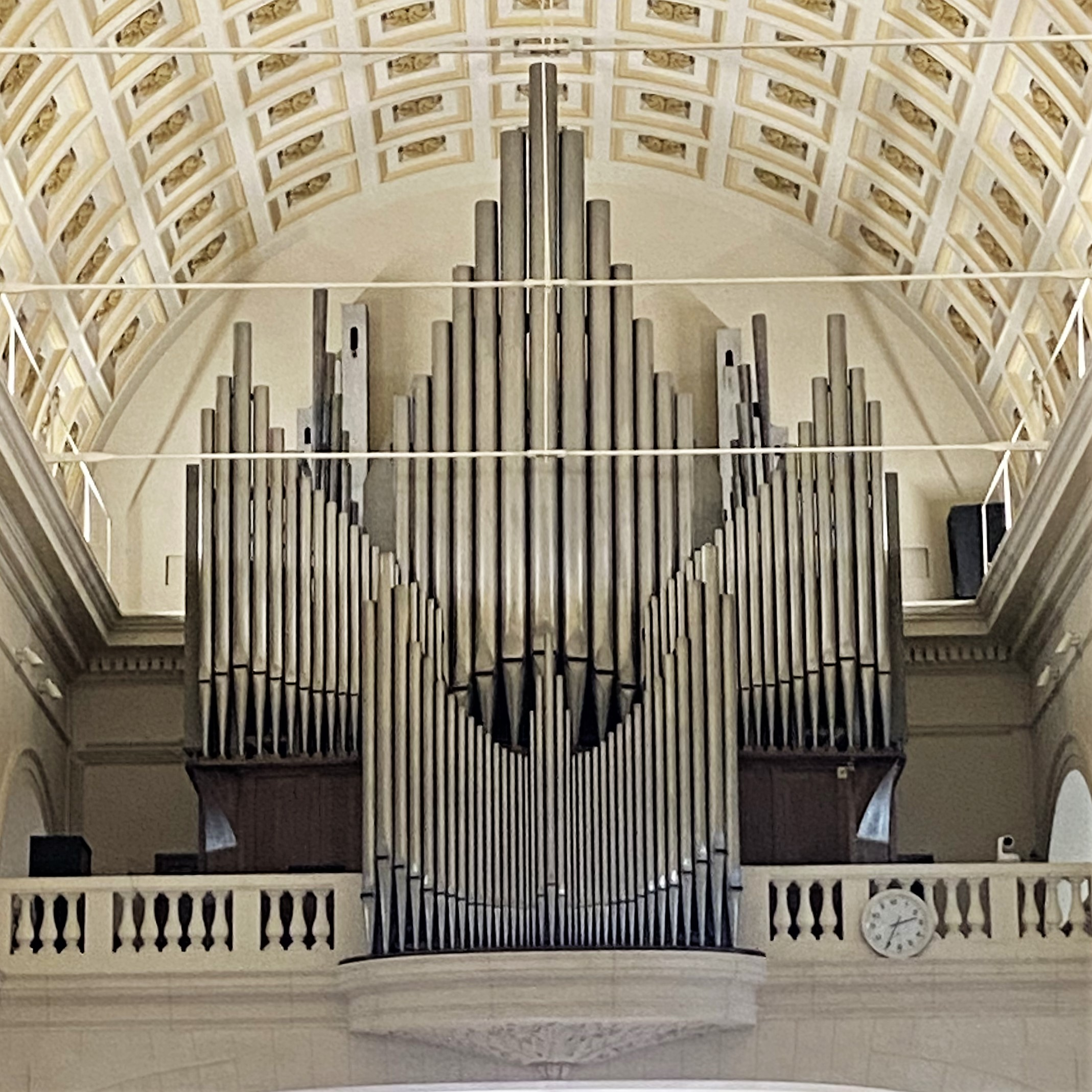
The great organ over the portal

The interior is decorated with classical order. The vaulted ceiling of the nave is composed of panels with sculpted roses, and is lined with rows of Doric pillars supporting curved arches. There is no lateral chapel. The chapel of the Virgin behind the main altar was constructed in 1871.

The decoration of the nave includes the original bell of the church, called "Louise-Sophie" made in 1826. A statue of the Virgin Mary with child is placed to the right of the altar.

== Chapel of the Virgin, or Chapel of the Messe ==
The Chapel of the Virgin or Chapel de Messe, built in 1971, makes a striking contrast to the more traditional nave. It is extremely modern in design, in the style of the 1970s, with right angles predominant. Its decoration includes vine=like abstract sculpture creeping along the walls, and very vivid modern stained glass windows in abstract geometric forms.

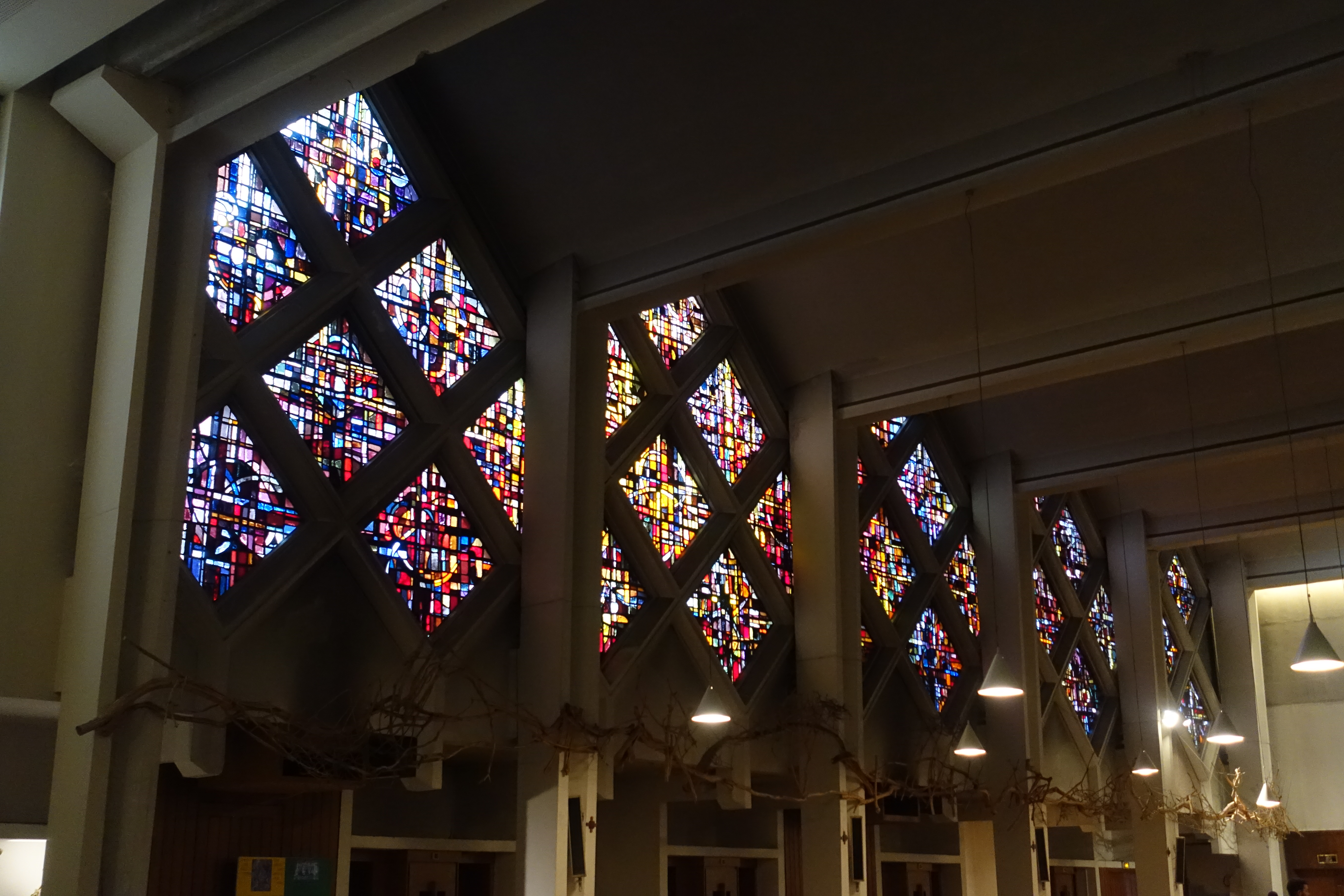
Stained glass in the Chapel of the Messe

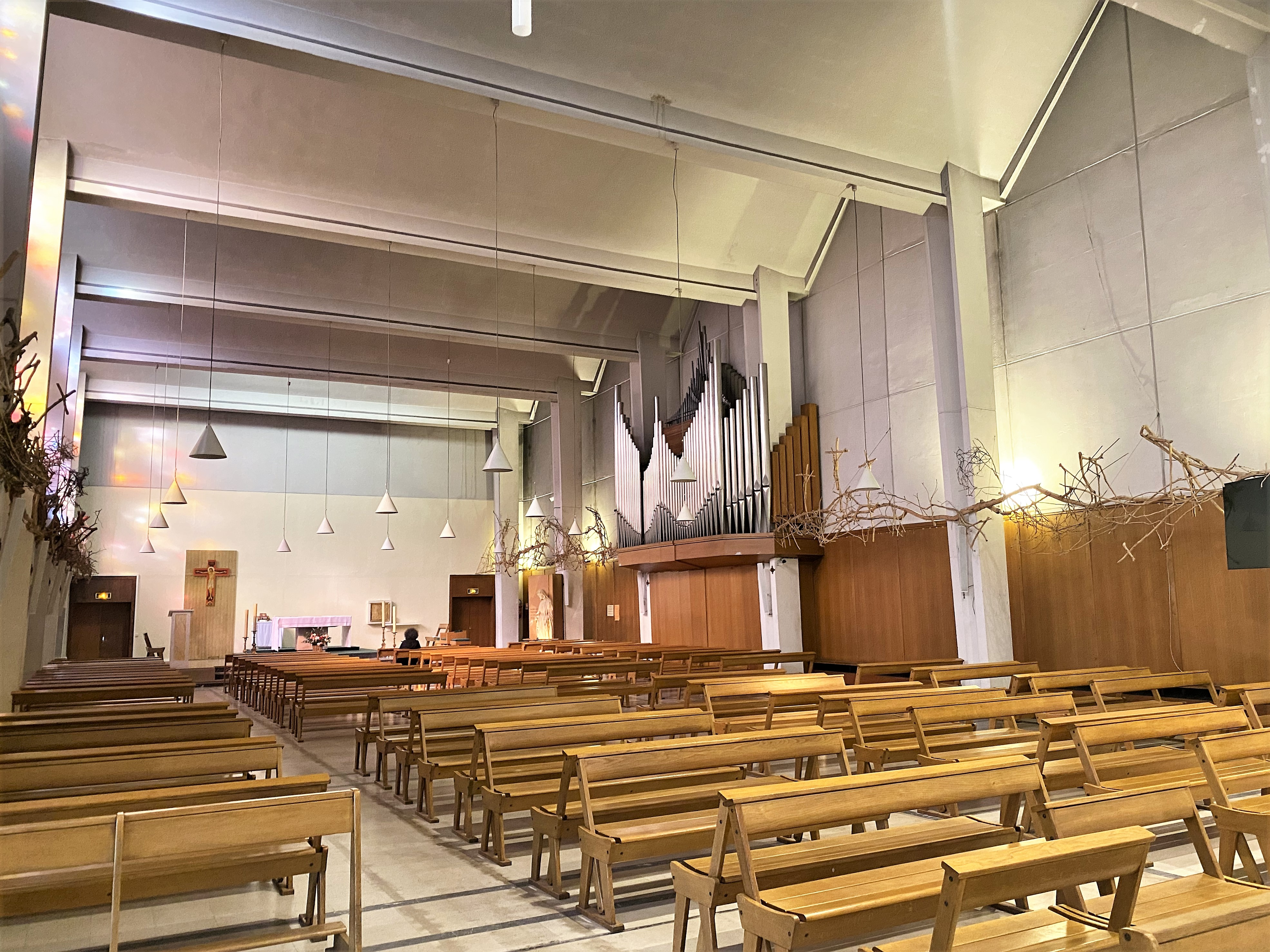
The chapel

== Art and stained glass ==
The most interesting painting in the church is the painting of Saint Francis praying, made by Jean Batiste Marie Pierre in 1747. He became the court painter for King Louis XVI. The painter died a few days before the French Revolution.

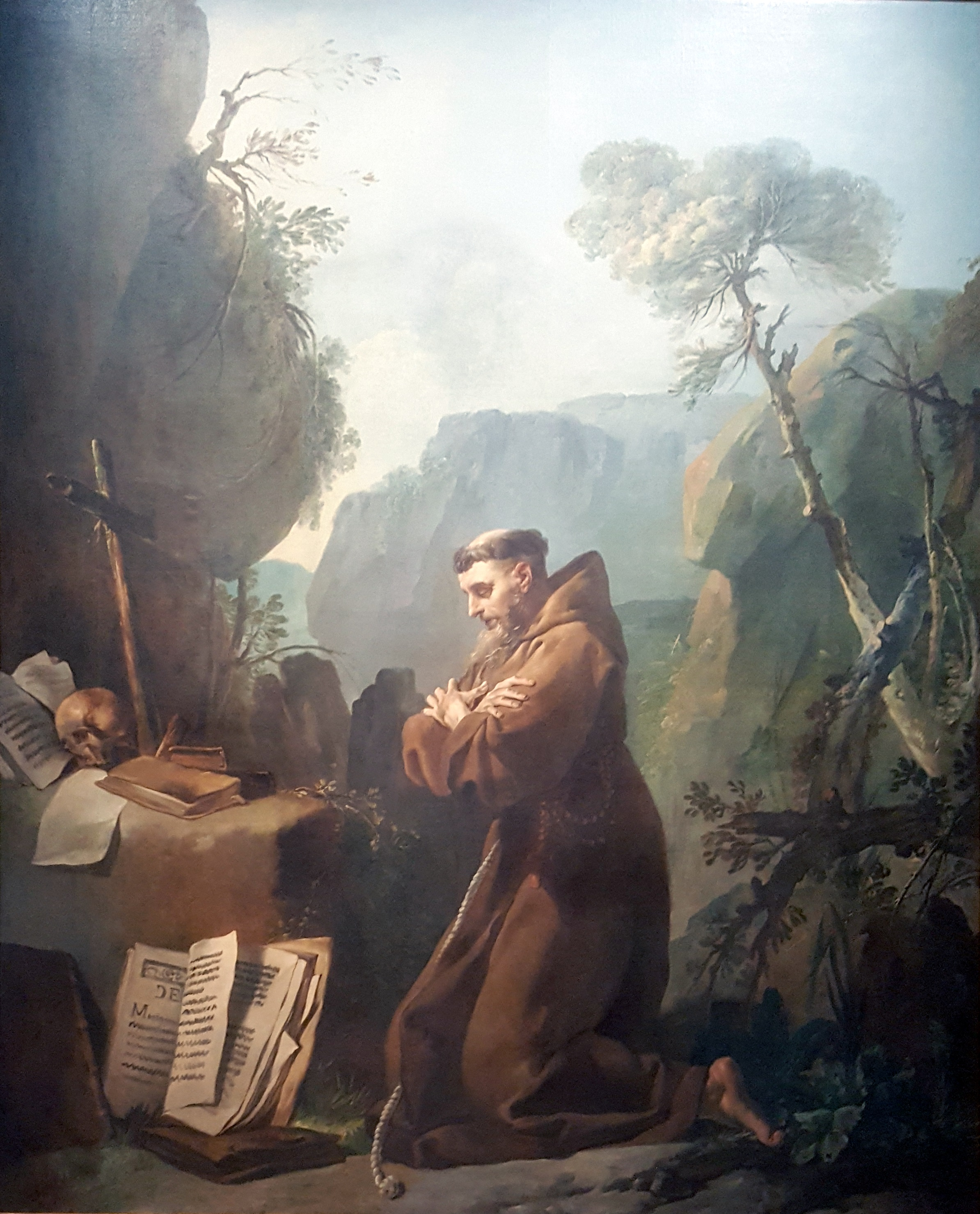
Saint Francis Meditiating. by Jean-Baptiste Marie Pierre (1747]

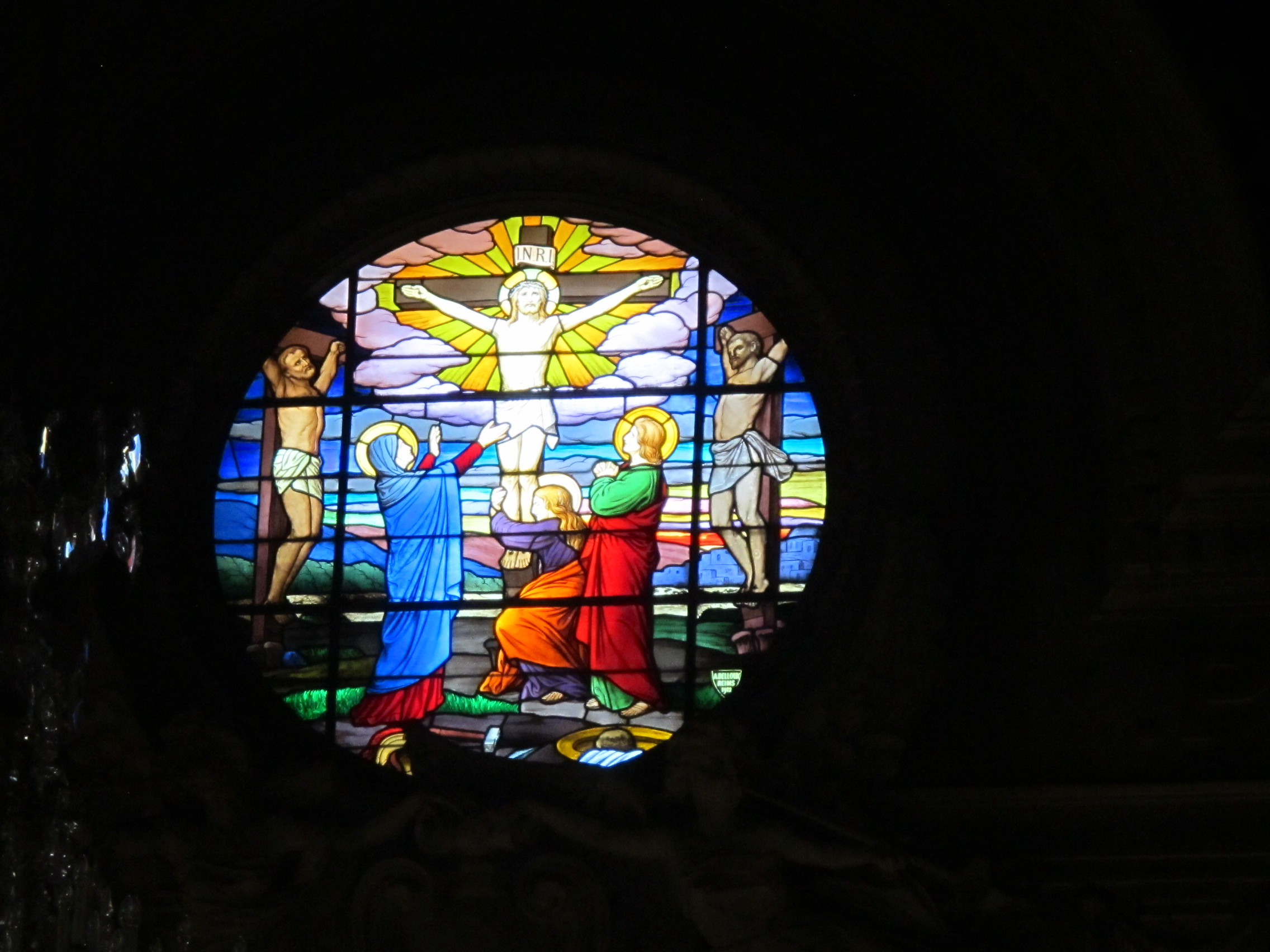

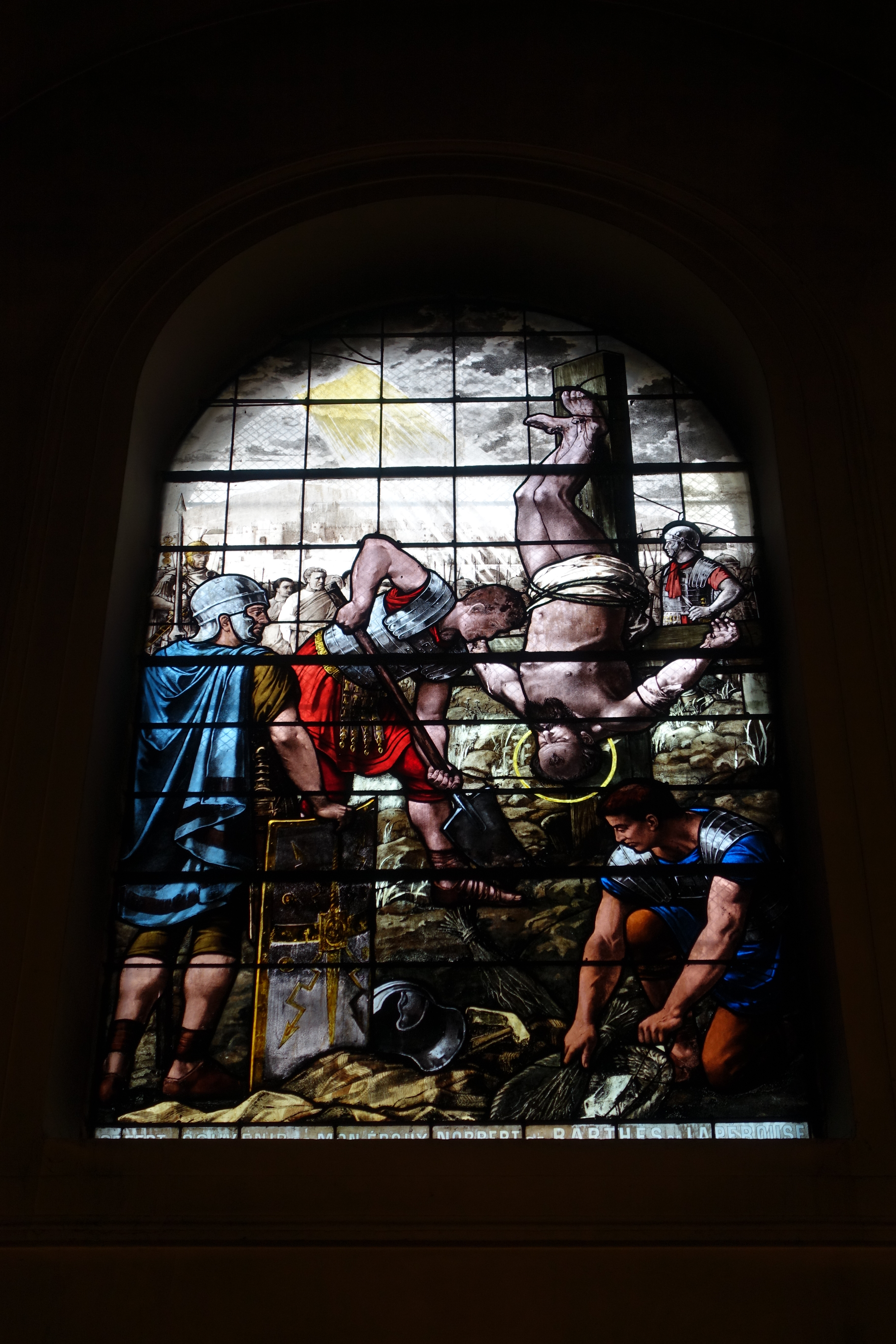

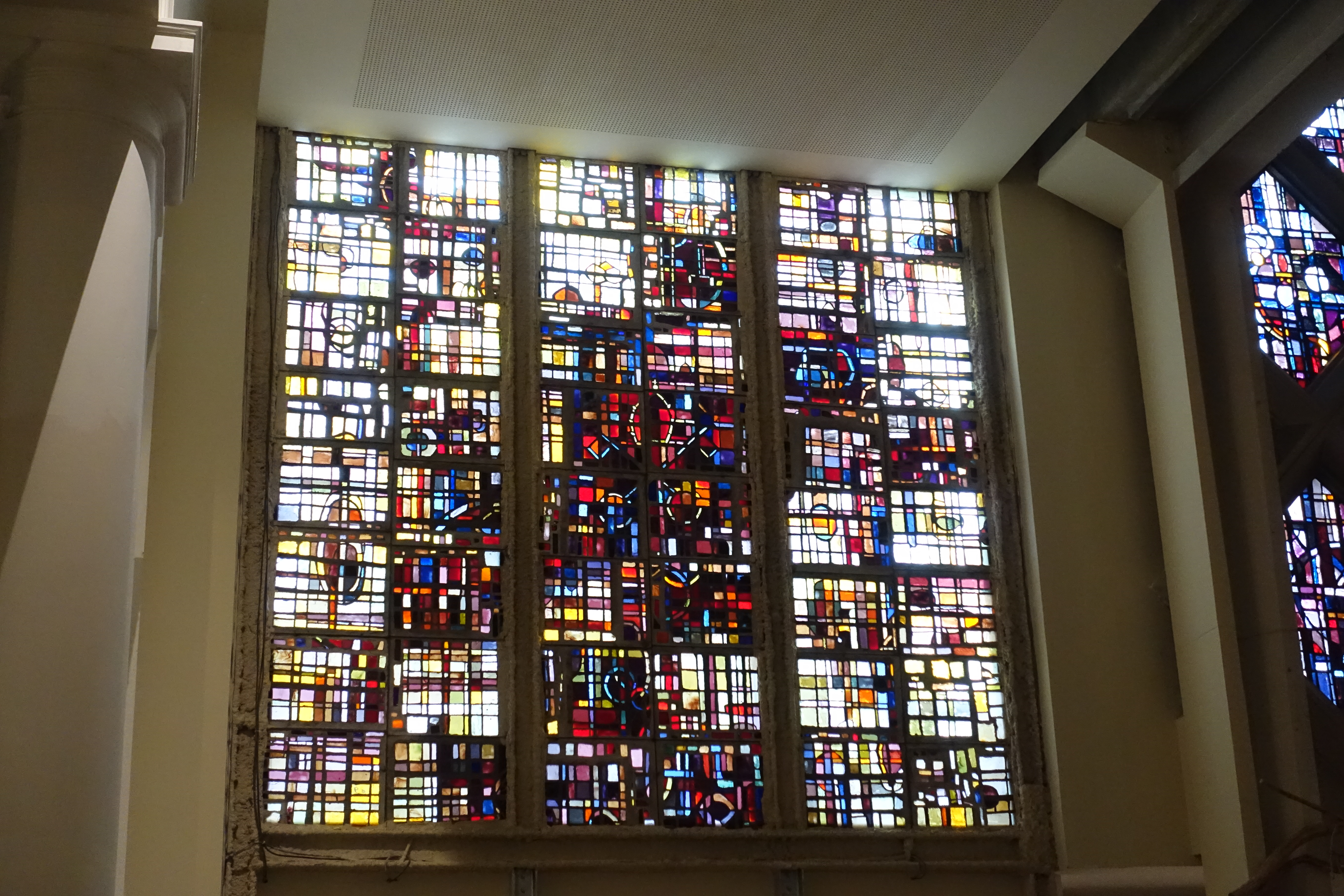
