= Saint-Denis de La Chartre =

Destroyed church in Paris, France

- Église Saint-Denis-de-la-Chartre
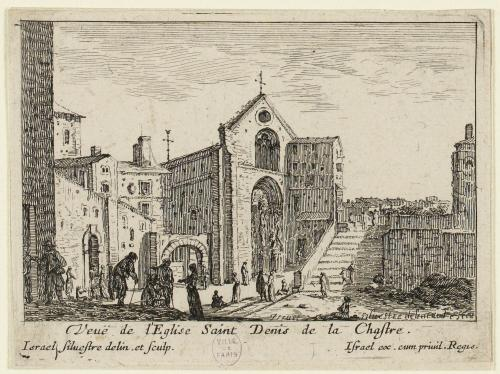
- The church around 1650 (drawing by Israël Sylvestre)

- Location within Paris

Religion
- Affiliation: Archdiocese of Paris (Roman Catholic)

Location
- Location: Île de la Cité, Paris
- Country: France
- Interactive map of Saint-Denis de La Chartre
- Coordinates: 48.85519°N 2.34865°E

Architecture
- Demolished: 1810

Saint-Denis de La Chartre (French: église Saint-Denis-de-la-Chartre or église du prieuré Saint-Denis-de-la-Chartre) was a Roman Catholic church building located on the Île de la Cité in Paris, France. It was demolished in 1810.

== Location ==
The church was situated on Rue de la Lanterne-en-la-Cité at the northern corner of Rue du Haut-Moulin-en-la-Cité, in front of Rue de la Pelleterie. It stood at the beginning of the Pont Notre-Dame in the corner of today's Quai de la Corse and Rue d'Arcole

== History ==
Even though the church may have existed in the beginning of the 11th century, the current building was built in the 12th or 13th century in the alignment of the northern part of the former Gallo-Roman walls. It was surrounded by a small feudal plot. The church was the seat of one of the 14 parishes of La Cité that were founded in the mid-eleventh century.

The population of the parish was evaluated at 1,060 around 1300.

The parish was transferred to Saint Symphorien's in 1618 and merged with the parish of Sainte Madeleine in 1698.

The church was re-built in the 14th century and demolished in 1810.

== Bibliography ==
- Aubin-Louis Millin, Antiquités nationales ou Recueil de monumens pour servir à l'histoire générale et particulière de l'empire françois, tels que tombeaux, inscriptions, statues... tirés des abbayes, monastères, châteaux et autres lieux devenus domaines nationaux. Tome 1 (in French).
- Jean de La Tynna. Dictionnaire topographique, étymologique et historique des rues de Paris (in French).
- Hillairet, Jacques. Dictionnaire historique des rues de Paris (in French).
- Friedmann, Adrien (1959). Paris, ses rues, ses paroisses du Moyen Âge à la Révolution (in French). Plon.
