= Statue of Charlemagne (Aachen) =

Outdoor sculpture in Germany

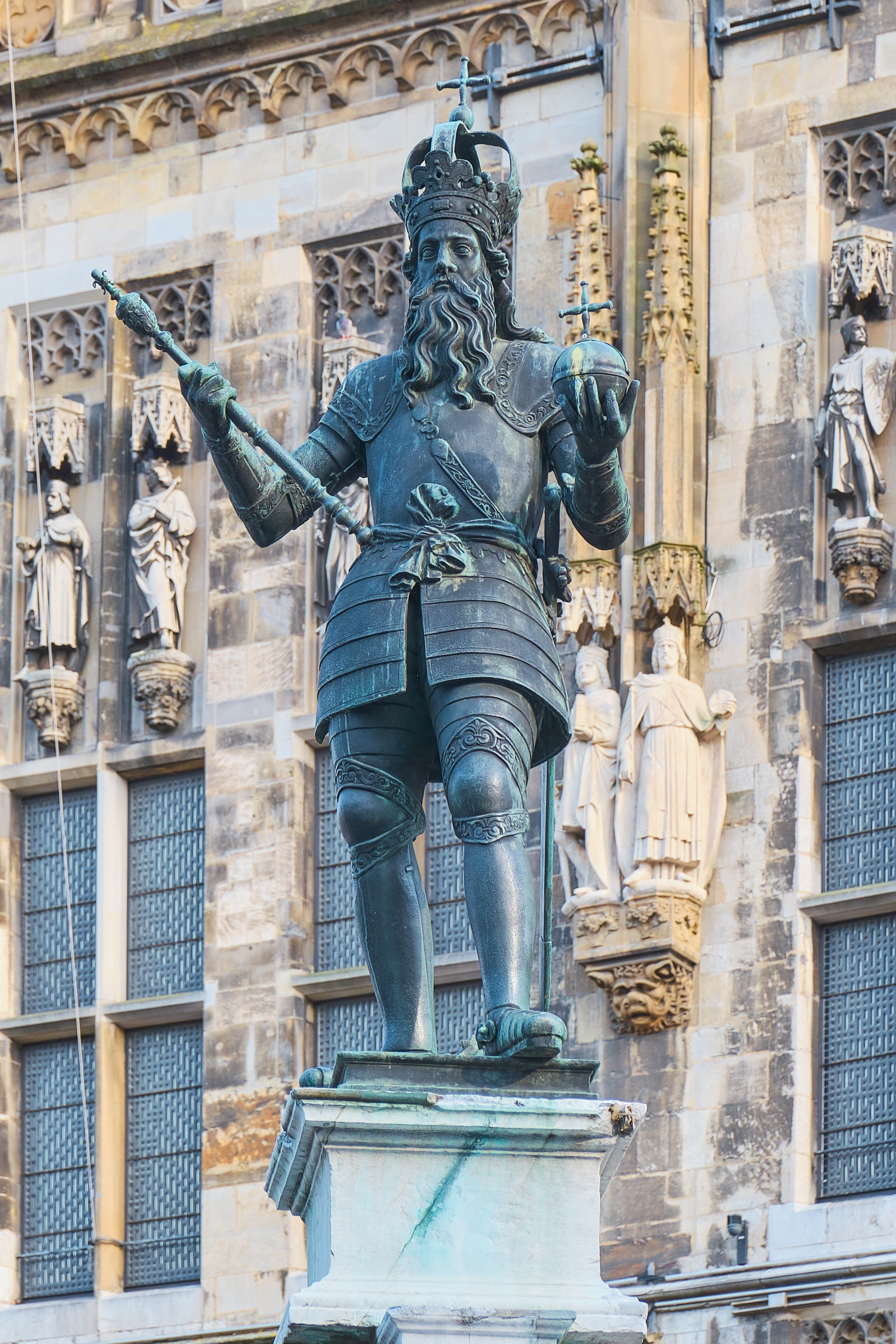
Statue of Charlemagne (1969 copy) in front of Aachen Town Hall

The statue of Charlemagne is a prominent public sculpture representing Charlemagne in Aachen. It was first erected in 1620 on the Marktplatz in front of Aachen Town Hall, as part of the monumental Karlsbrunnen fountain. The statue now standing on the Karlsbrunnen is a 1969 copy, and the original has been kept since 2014 at the nearby Centre Charlemagne museum. It has become the most popular image of Charlemagne in the monarch's chosen capital of Aachen.

== History ==
A medieval fountain was erected on the Marktplatz around 1334. The current statue was cast in Dinant, on a design by Peter von Trier and his nephew Frans von Trier of the Trier family of bellfounders, whereas the 6-ton fountain basin was cast in Aachen.

The fountain was modified by Johann Joseph Couven in the 1730s. The statue was appropriated by French troops during the Rhineland Campaign of 1792 and transferred to Paris, but Napoleon gave it back to Aachen in June 1805 upon a request from Aachen mayor Johann Wilhelm Gottfried von Lommessem, who had visited Paris in December 1804 and attended Napoleon's coronation ceremony. It was removed again during World War II for protection and kept in the town hall's basement until re-erection in 1948.

in 1969, the statue was deposed on preservation grounds and replaced by the current copy. The original was exhibited in the town hall's Coronation Hall (Krönungssaal) until the creation of the Centre Charlemagne on the Katschhof, where it has been kept since 2014, the 1200th anniversary of Charlemagne's death.

== Gallery ==
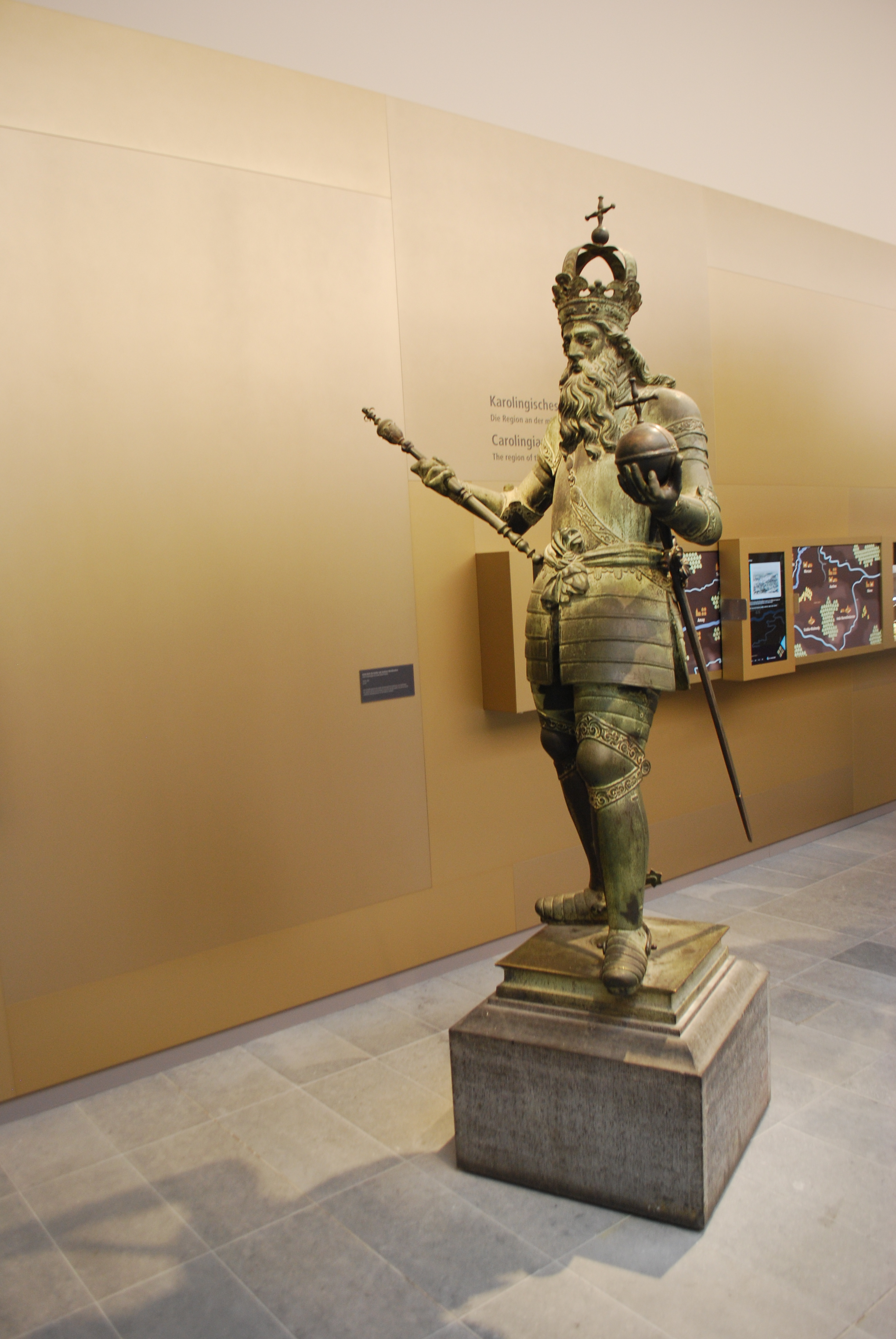
The statue as displayed in Centre Charlemagne in 2014

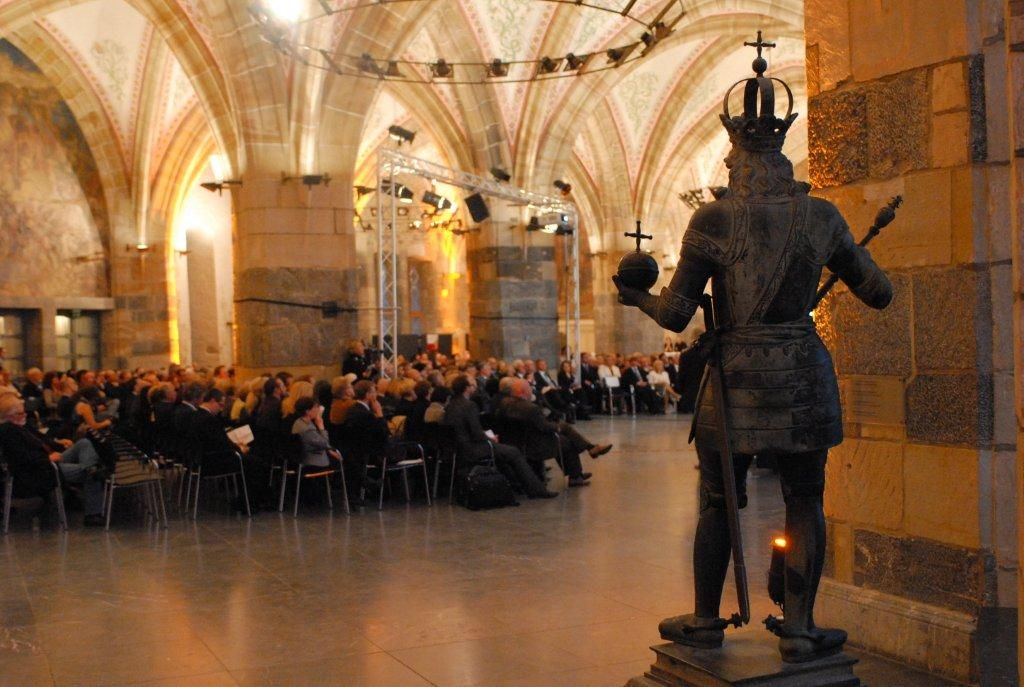
The statue in Aachen Town Hall, in 2013 before its transfer to the current location

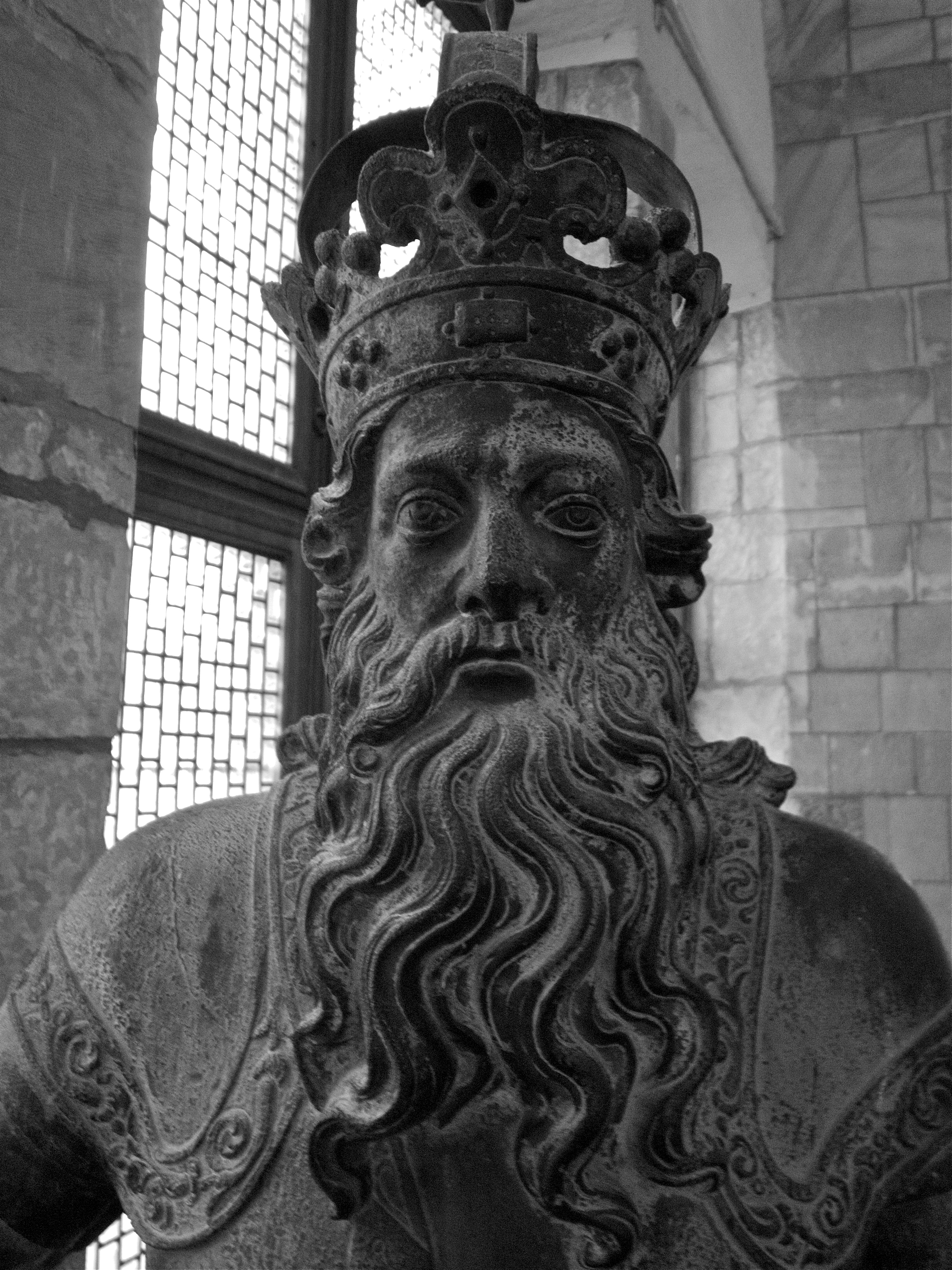
Detail of head

== See also ==
- Equestrian statue of Charlemagne (Cornacchini)
- Alte Brücke (Frankfurt)
- Statue of Charlemagne (Liège)
- Charlemagne et ses Leudes
- Iconography of Charlemagne
