= Statue of Charlemagne (Liège) =

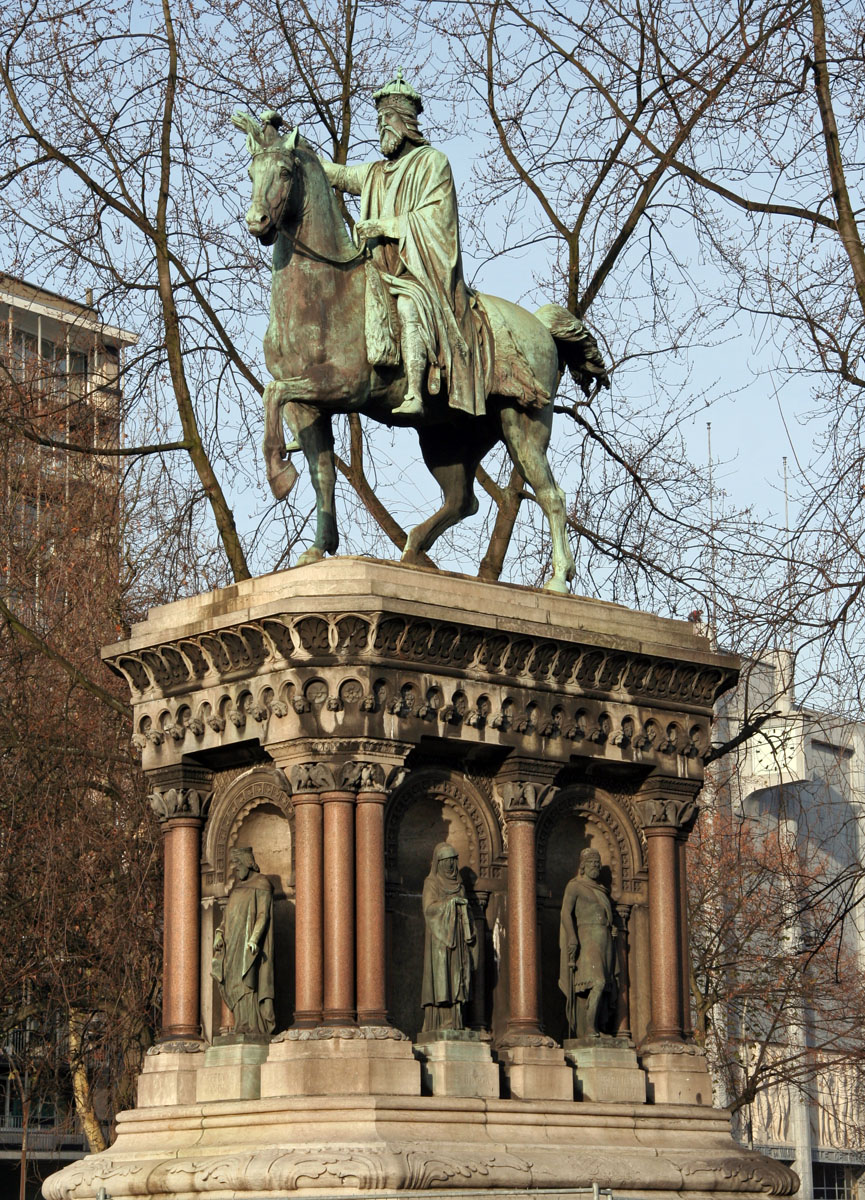
Statue of Charlemagne

The statue of Charlemagne is a prominent public monument topped by an equestrian statue of Charlemagne in Liège, created by sculptor Louis Jehotte in 1867.

== History ==
Louis Jehotte suggested the idea of the monument to the city of Liège in 1855 based on his lifelong interest on Charlemagne, about whom he would later coauthor an essay jointly with his friend André van Hasselt, published in 1880. In this, Jehotte echoed a broader aspiration for national heroes in the young Belgian nation. But his effort was complicated by uncertainty about the exact location of Charlemagne's birthplace, with Liège being only one of the contenders.

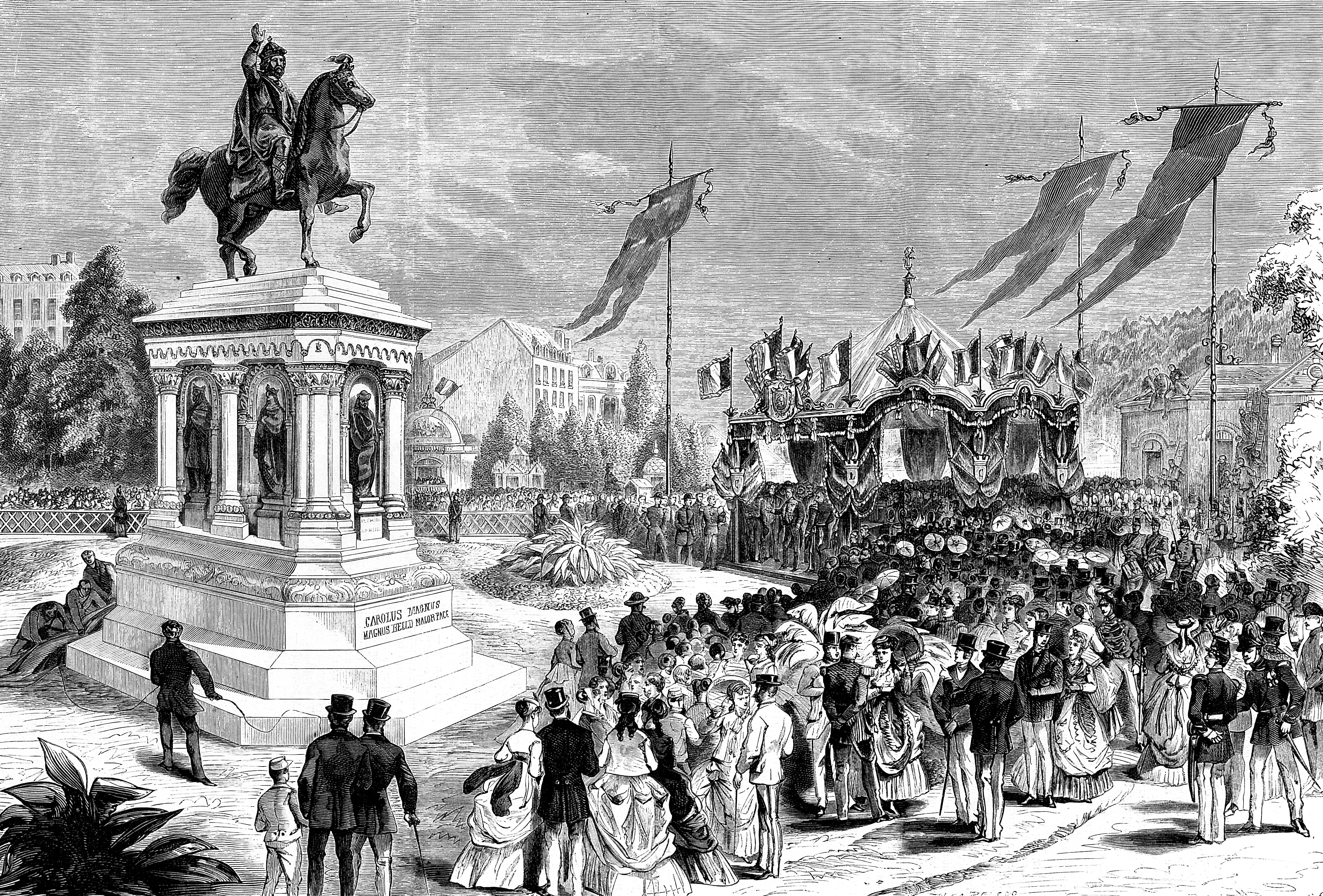
Inauguration of the statue on 26 July 1868 as depicted in L'Univers illustré of 8 August 1868

The city authorities endorsed Jehotte's suggestion of a Charlemagne monument in 1860, and in 1862 also agreed to locate it on Jehotte's recommendation on the central Place Saint-Lambert, where the Cathedral of Saint Lambert had stood until its demolition in the late 18th century. The latter decision was modified in 1863, however, when the municipality opted for the current spot, on a square at the crossing of Boulevard d'Avroy and Boulevard Piercot, in what was then a newly developed neighborhood. Jehotte contested that decision in court, but lost; he completed the work in his Brussels workshop in 1867. The monument was inaugurated on 26 July 1868 in the presence of Charles de Luesemans, Governor of the Liège Province.

In 1888, three of the pedestal's statues were damaged by vandalism. The entire monument was renovated in 2011–2012.

== Description ==
Charlemagne is represented wearing a chlamys and tunic, with a short sword on his side, and extending his arm in a gesture of friendship and protection towards France.

On the pedestal stand depictions of his father Pepin the Short, mother Bertrada of Laon, grandfather Charles Martel, great-grandfather Pepin of Herstal, great-great-grandmother Begga and the latter's father Pepin of Landen. This choice of depicted ancestors reflects Jehotte's focus on the branch of Charlemagne's family that originated in Liège and its neighborhood.

== See also ==
- Statue of Charlemagne (Aachen)
- Equestrian statue of Charlemagne (Cornacchini)
- Alte Brücke (Frankfurt)
- Charlemagne et ses Leudes
- Iconography of Charlemagne
