= Parvis Notre-Dame – Place Jean-Paul II =

City square in Paris, France

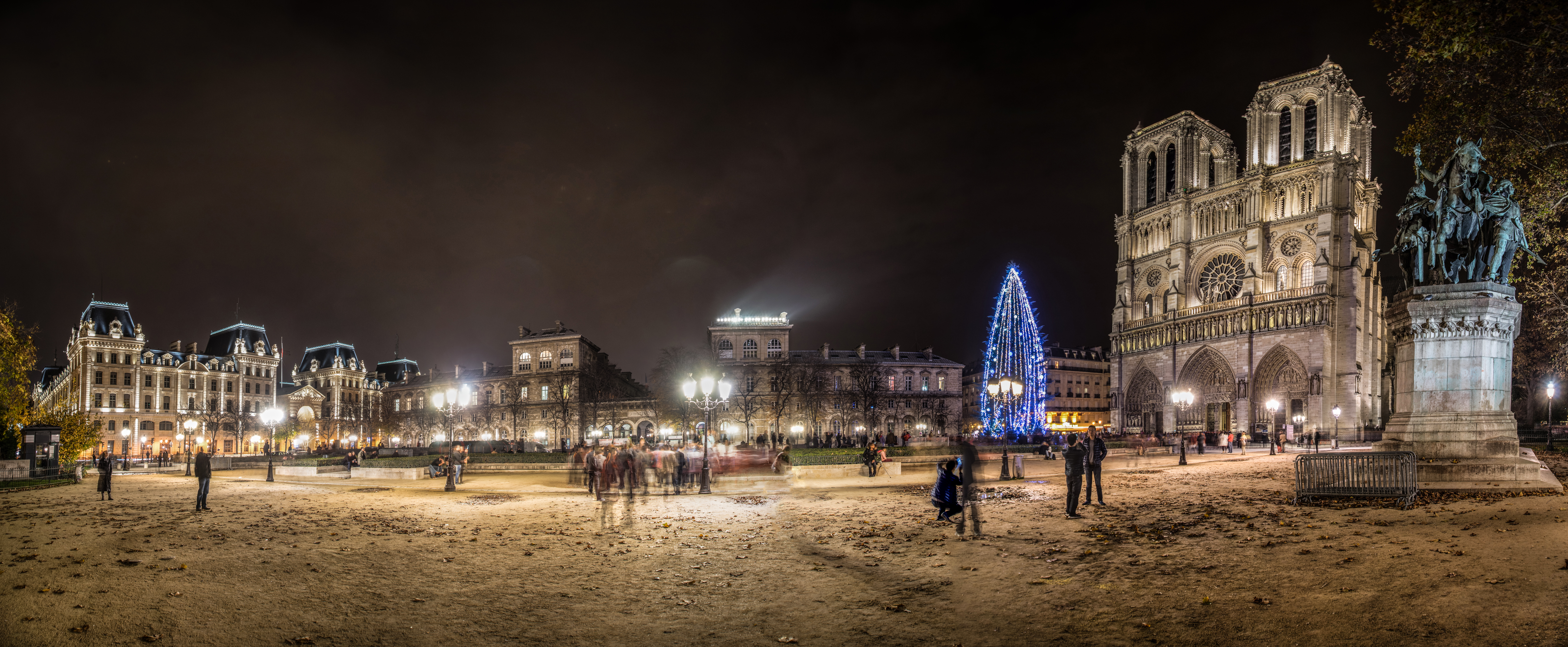
Nighttime view of the Parvis Notre-Dame in 2014

The Parvis Notre-Dame – Place Jean-Paul II is a square in the 4th arrondissement of Paris. Located on the eastern half of the Île de la Cité, the square is bordered by the Hôtel-Dieu hospital to the north, Notre-Dame cathedral to the east, the Seine to the south, and the Prefecture of Police headquarters to the west. The square contains France's point zéro marker, making it the very center of Paris for the purpose of measuring travel distance. Other points of interest include the Archaeological Crypt of the Île de la Cité and Charlemagne et ses Leudes, an equestrian statue of Charlemagne.

== Name ==
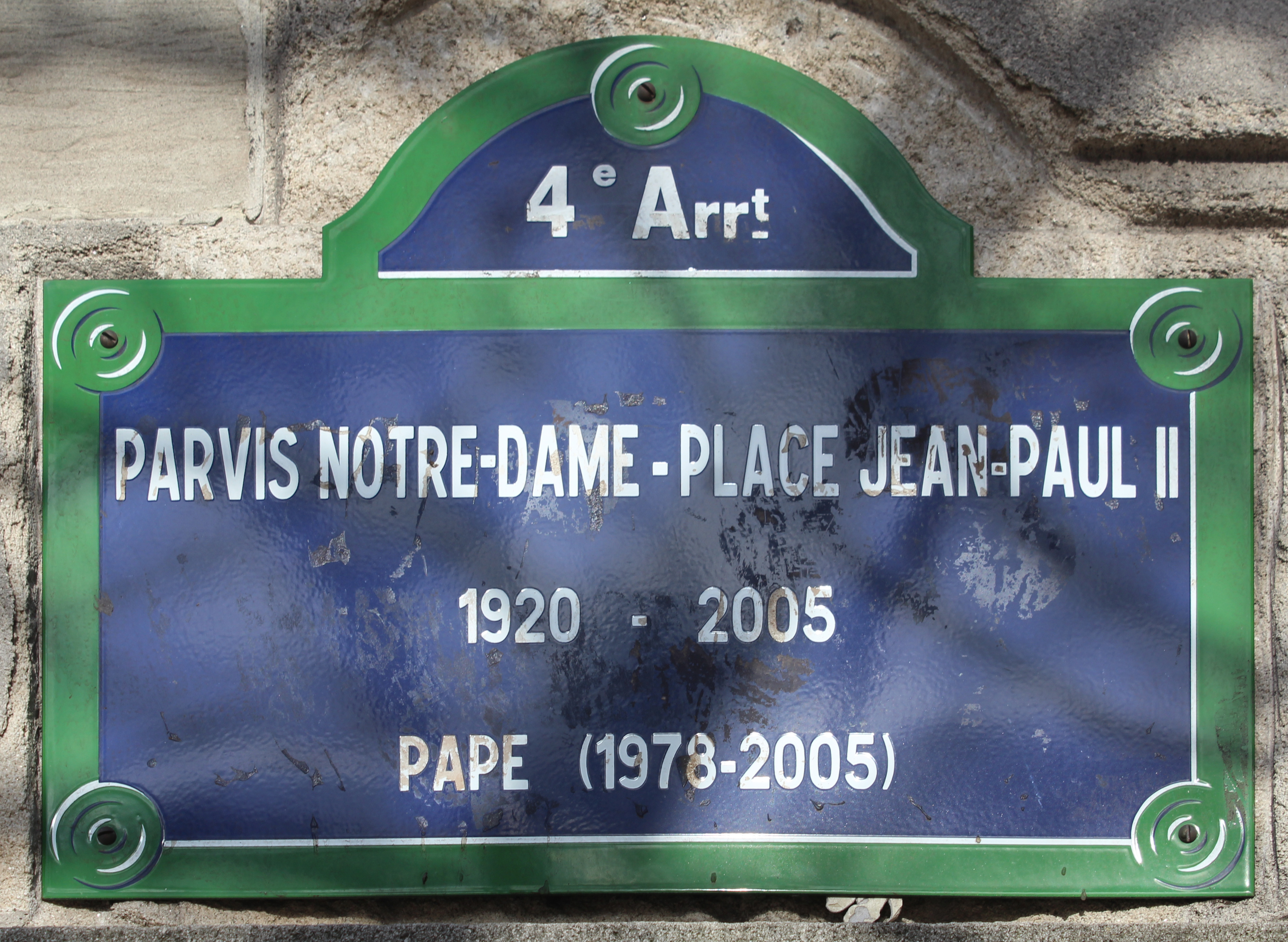
One of two plaques on the southern corners of the Hôtel-Dieu, unveiled in 2006

Historically, the square has been called the Place du Parvis Notre-Dame, or shortened to the Place du Parvis or the Parvis Notre-Dame. This is due to its historic function as the parvis of Notre-Dame de Paris.

After the death of Pope John Paul II in 2005, it was proposed to rename the square to Place Jean-Paul II. The name was intended to memorialize the late pope's visit to the square in 1980, as well as his subsequent visit to Notre-Dame in 1997 for World Youth Day. The proposal was controversial, however, eventually resulting in the square's current compound name in 2006.

== History ==
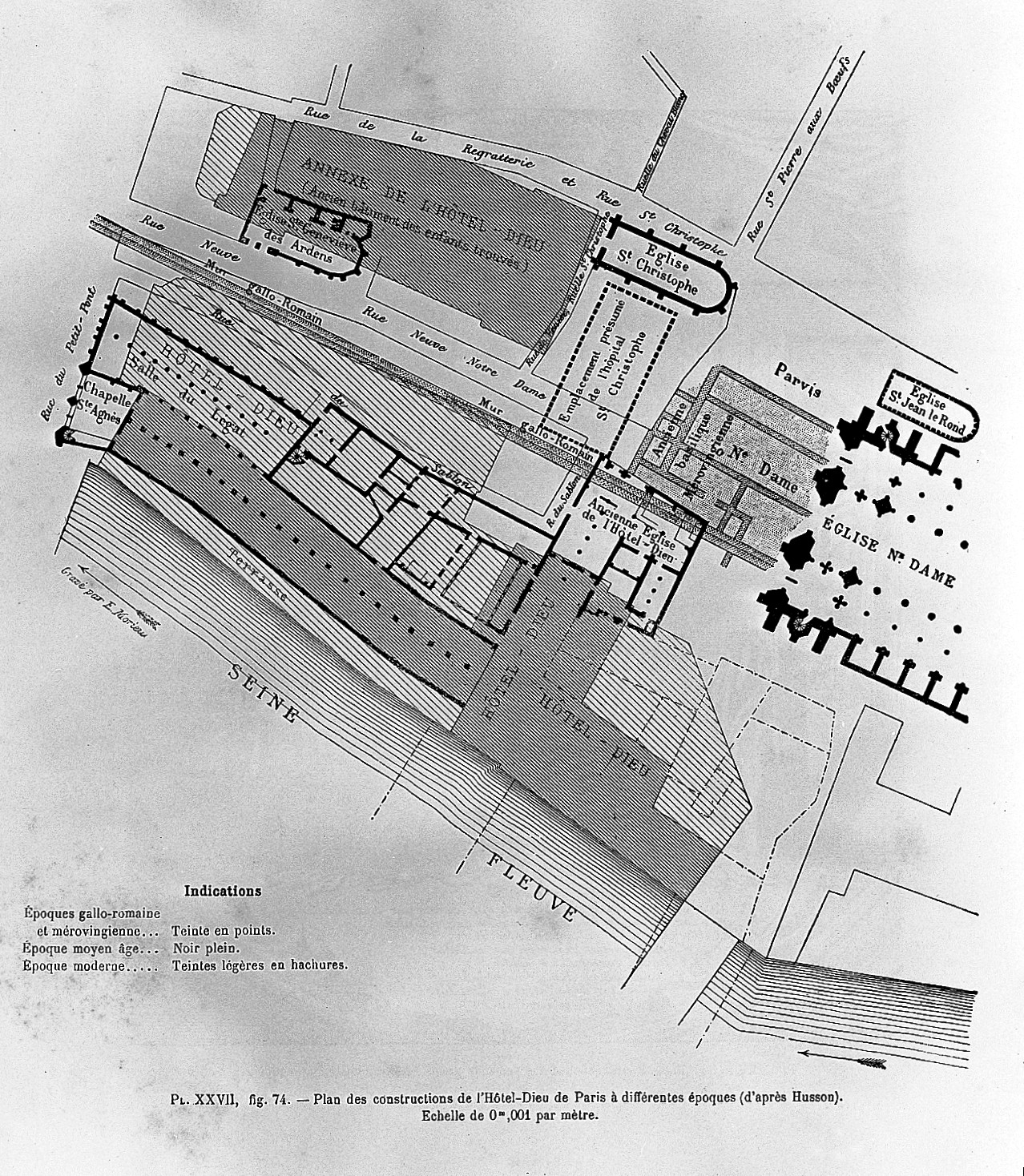
1889 map showing overlaying structures built over the parvis from Roman times to the late Middle Ages

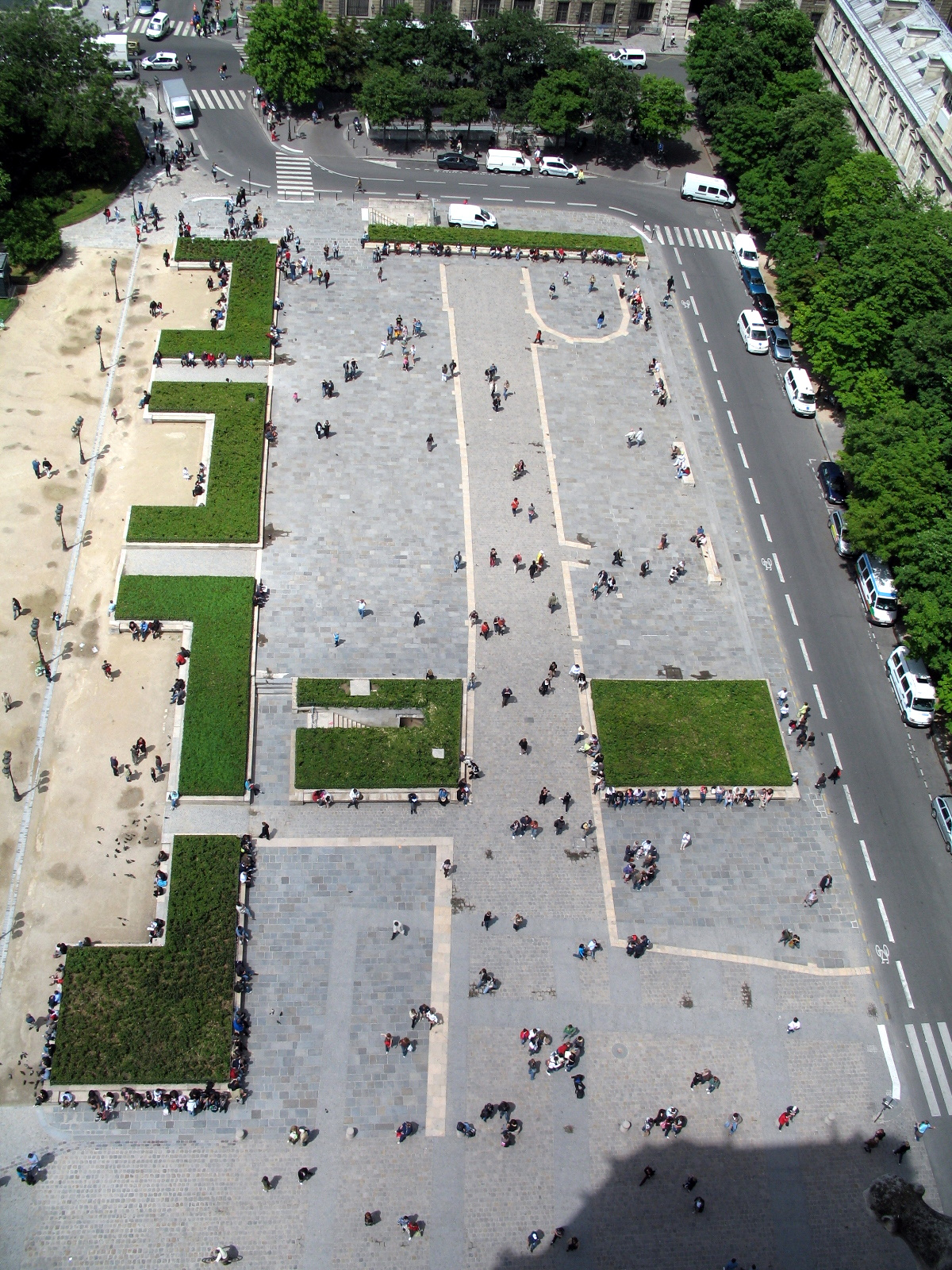
The parvis from Notre-Dame's south tower in 2008. The outline of Saint-Etienne is marked with small light-gray cobblestones in the lower part of the image. The higher contrast white stones mark the Rue Neuve-Notre-Dame (center), the church of Sainte-Geneviève-des-Ardents (upper right), and the medieval parvis (lower right) which includes the point zéro.

The topography of the parvis and its surroundings has changed over time: the surface of the current square sits about four to five meters above the ancient ground level, and the ancient bank of the river, originally located at the center of the current square, has since moved about 50 meters to the south. Many different buildings were constructed over the years, including a Roman defensive wall and Saint Etienne de Paris, an early medieval church. The remains of many of these buildings can now be seen in the Archaeological Crypt underneath the square.

The parvis was first mentioned in 1160, just before the construction of Notre-Dame began. During the Middle Ages, the square was only about 1,000 square meters, roughly one tenth of its current size. Surrounding buildings at the time included Saint-Jean-le-Rond and Notre-Dame to the east, the chapel of the Hôtel-Dieu to the south, and the Hôpital des Enfants-Trouvés and the church of Saint-Christophe de Paris to the west. During the Middle Ages, convicted criminals were often taken to the parvis before their executions to make public confession. The parvis was not used as a place of execution, however, until the Reformation, and even then this was reserved for those convicted of religious crimes. Examples of this include Jean Vallière in 1523 as the first Lutheran in France to be sentenced to death, Jacques Belon in 1548 and Jean Thuret in 1550, both of whom attacked a statue of the Virgin inside Notre-Dame, and François Sarazin in 1670, who murdered a priest inside Notre-Dame.

The first major expansion took place in the early 18th century when the church and hospital of Saint-Christophe were demolished. The size of the square was doubled and a fountain was added on the western side. Drawings made at the time show that a short wall was built around the western and northern sides of the square to control traffic. A short series of steps led down into the parvis, which was about half a meter below the surrounding streets.

The first archaeological digs in the parvis were done in the eastern side of the square in 1842. Workers at that time discovered the original western steps of Notre-Dame, which had been covered over by centuries of repaving. Jean-Baptiste Lassus and Eugène Viollet-le-Duc referenced this recent discovery in their written proposal to restore Notre-Dame in 1843. Later in 1847, Lassus and Viollet-le-Duc oversaw further excavations in the parvis, during which the foundations of the Roman wall and Saint-Etienne were found.

During the 1853 to 1870 renovation of Paris by Baron Haussmann, many buildings on the Île de la Cité were demolished, including all the buildings between the Rue de la Cité and the Rue d'Arcole. Between 1867 and 1878, the current Hôtel-Dieu building to the north of the square was built, and the hospital's old building to the south was demolished, at which point the parvis took on its current size and shape. The expansion of the parvis was intended to better display Notre-Dame's architecture. Although the change was not without its drawbacks, as American authors Richard and Clara Winston noted: "Something has been gained, something lost, by the creation of the vast open square in front. Distance diminishes size but provides a greater sense of the graciousness of the whole."

For about 100 years from the renovation of Baron Haussmann until the 1960s, the parvis was a major traffic thoroughfare, including a double tram line. The north and south sides of the square have remained largely unchanged since this time, besides the landscaping. On the north side is a wide walking path lined with horse chestnut trees. On the south side is a green space along the river planted with horse chestnut and plane trees. A promenade was built along the river, which has since been named for the Belgian poet Maurice Carême.

The statue Charlemagne et ses Leudes was installed in 1882 on the southside of the square. The statue's current pedestal dates to 1908.

The point zéro medallion was installed in 1924. The marker was used as a starting point for measuring distance on the National Route system. It was temporarily removed in 1966, and the same medallion was then replaced in 1972. In 2006, the location of the medallion was measured at 48°51′12.24845″N 2°20′55.62563″E to an accuracy of one centimeter. The usage of the parvis for measuring travel distance is a tradition originating in the Middle Ages by pilgrims travelling to Notre-Dame visiting a pre-Roman age statue commonly referred to as Monsieur Legris (Mister Grey), which was destroyed in 1748 when the square was enlarged and the medallion installed in its place. There are beliefs that the statue was the Greek god of medicine, Asclepius. In 1625, a fountain was built next to the statue with an inscription written in Latin on the statue reading, translated; “Approach those of you who are altered, and if by chance my waters are not enough, go to the temple and the goddess you invoke will prepare eternal waters for you”, with some believing the inscription references the Virgin Mary or a reminder to all Christians to pray and fast.

In 1965, excavation work began in the square to build an underground parking garage. In the process, ancient foundations were discovered going back to Roman times. The original plan for the garage was reduced to the west, while the ruins were rooved over by the parvis surface. The site was opened to visitors in 1980. The crypt is managed by the Musée Carnavalet, and contains a large exhibit, detailed models of the architecture of different time periods, and how they can be viewed within the ruins. The main feature still visible is the under-floor heating installed during the Roman period.

In 1972, the square received much of its current appearance. To make the space more pedestrian-friendly, vehicle traffic was diverted to a one-way street on the west and north of the square, while regular vehicle traffic from the Pont au Double was closed off. The square was repaved with its current paving stones which show the locations of some of the historical structures which once stood on the parvis. Benches and raised shrubbery beds were also added.

On 30 May 1980, Pope John Paul II celebrated Mass in Notre-Dame and also made an appearance on the parvis. It was the pope's first official visit to France and the first visit of any pope to France since 1814. The square was given its current name in 2006, after the death of the pope.

In 2017, an Algerian student attacked a police officer on the parvis resulting in a two-hour lockdown.

Since the 2019 Notre-Dame de Paris fire, the eastern half of the parvis has been closed off and used as a working space by the restoration team.

== Gallery ==
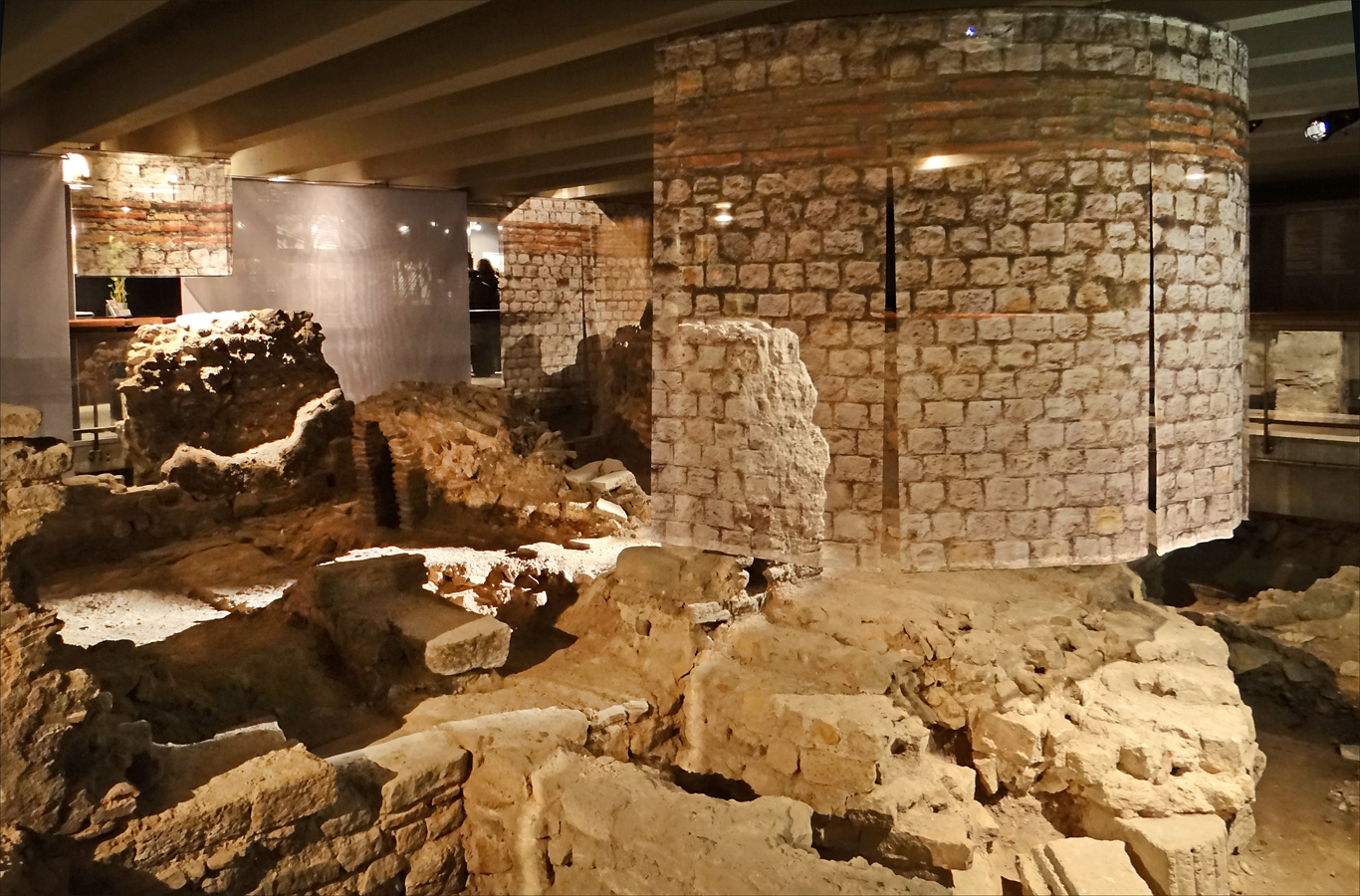
Ruins of 4th century hot baths built on the site of the future parvis, seen in the Archaeological Crypt of the Île de la Cité

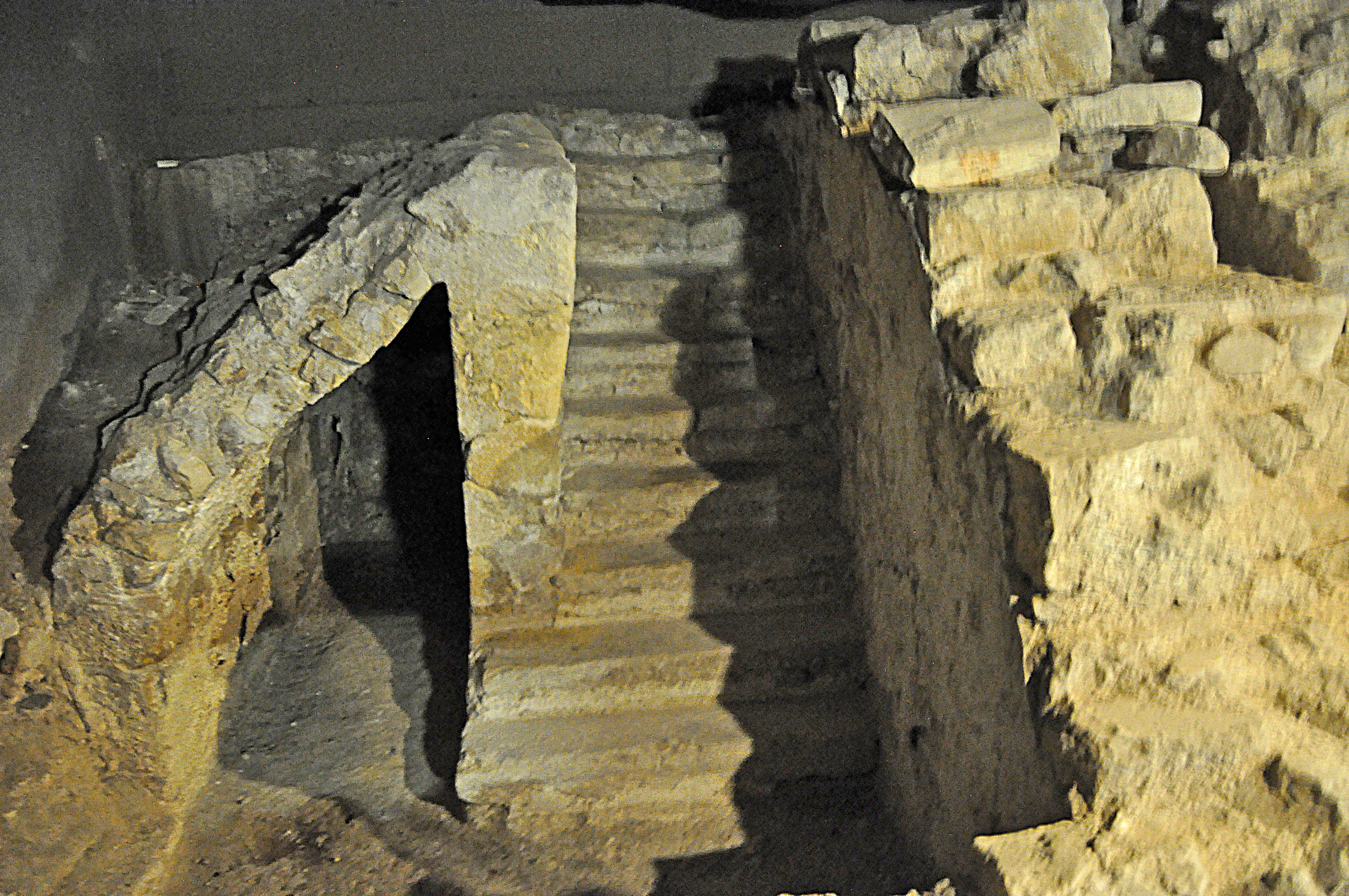
Stairs leading to an ancient wharf on the Seine, now almost 50 meters from the current riverbank

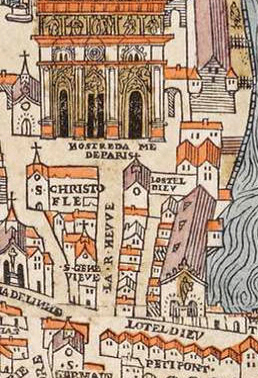
Detail of a 1550 map of Paris showing the extent of the parvis in the Middle Ages

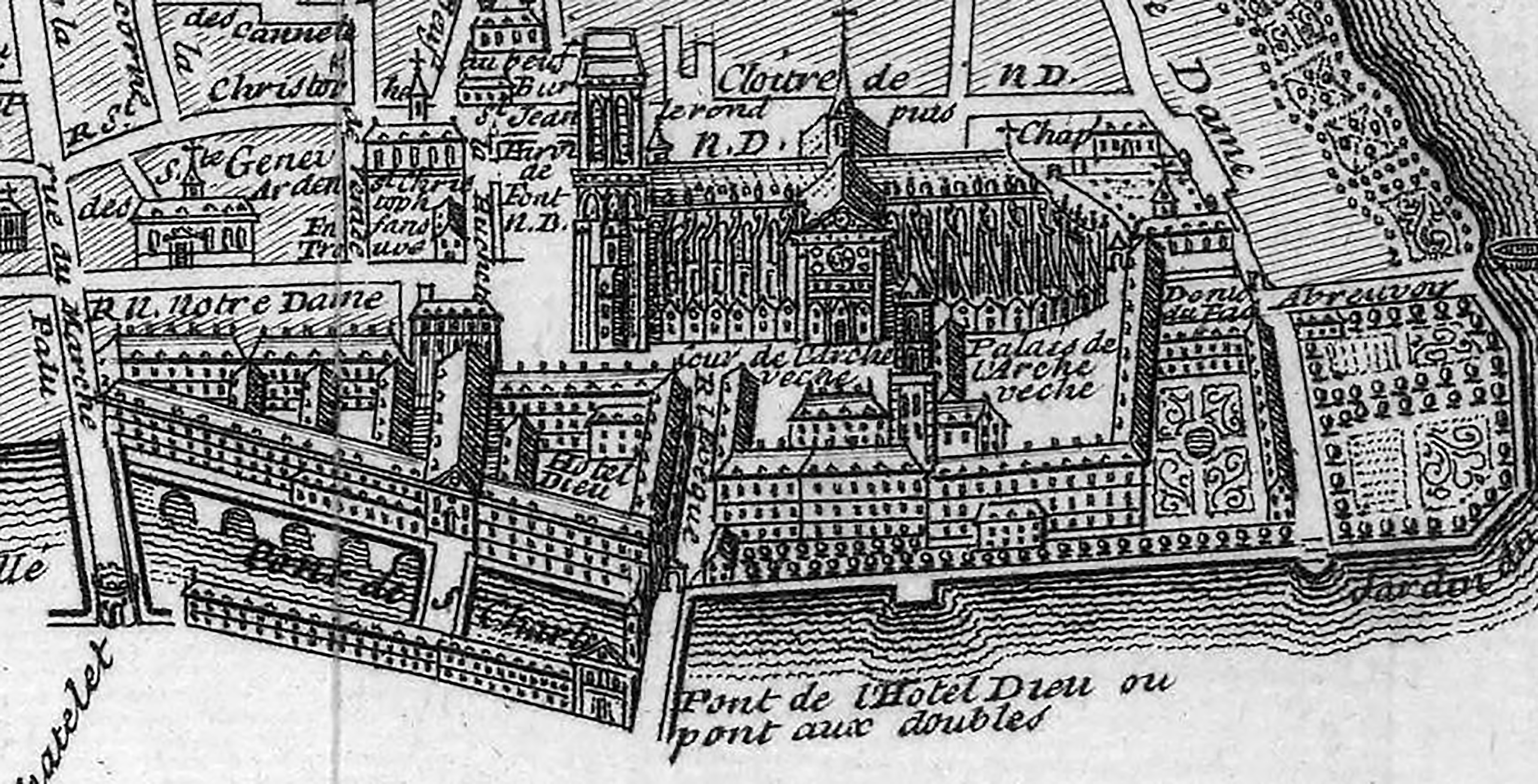
The parvis (left of center), pictured about 1711, still maintained much of its medieval size and shape.

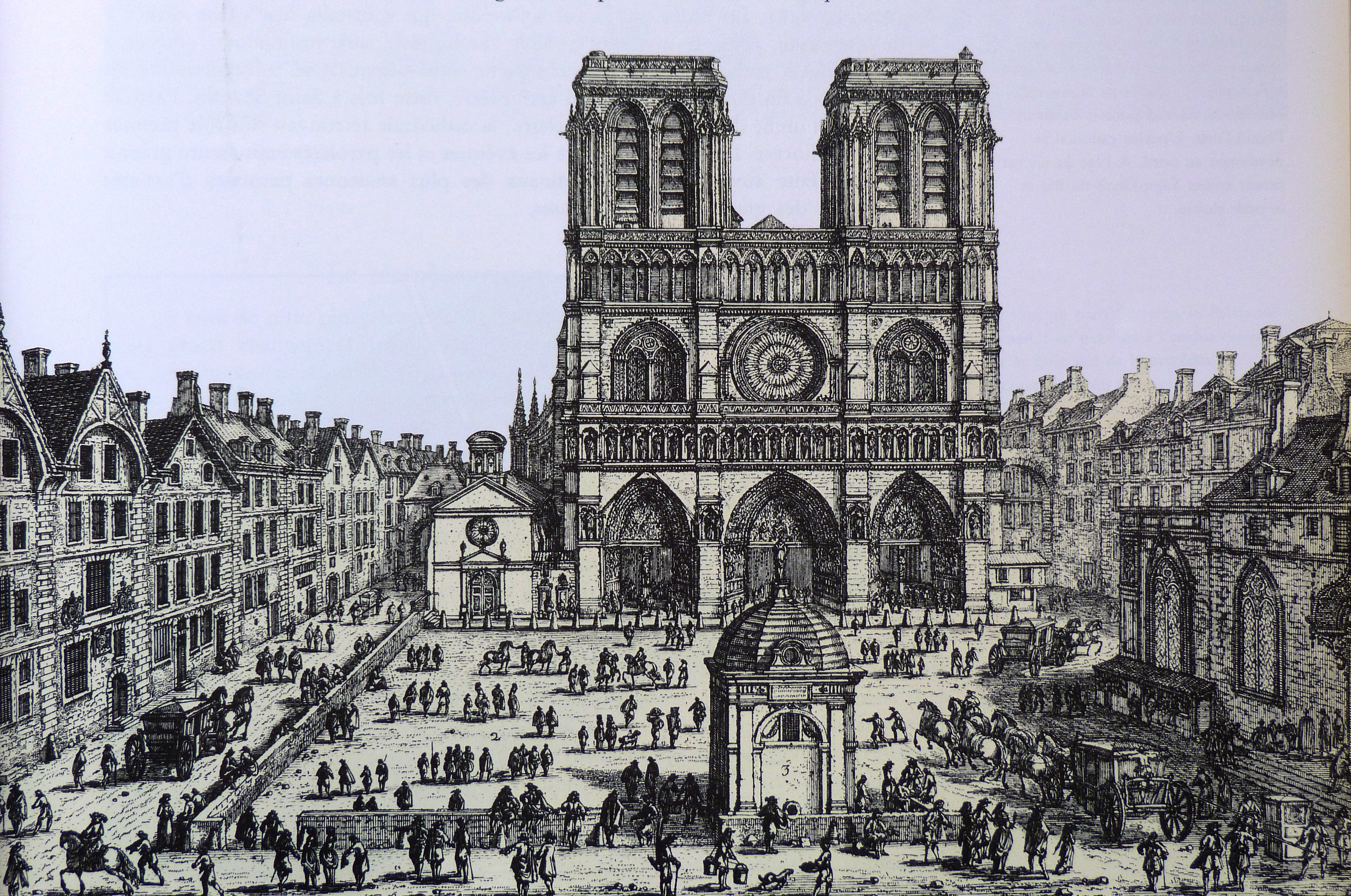
The parvis about 1735 after its first expansion. In the foreground is the parvis fountain.

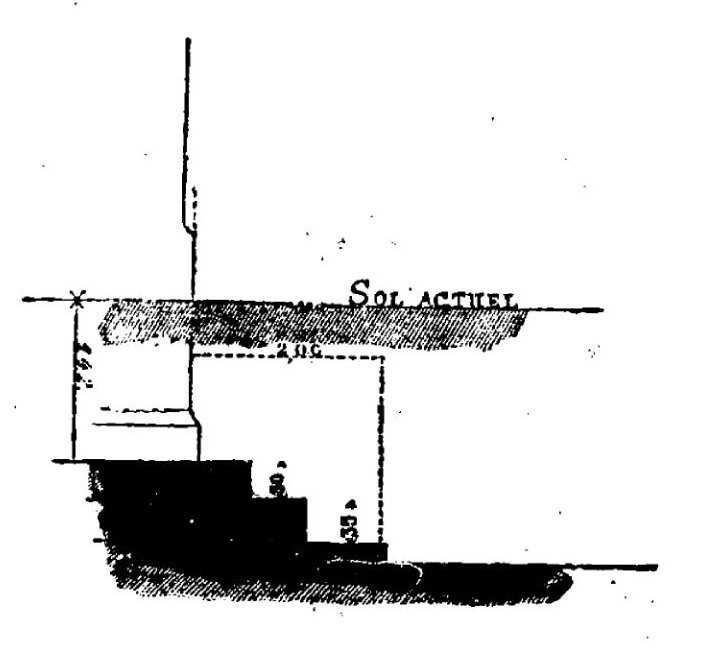
1843 diagram by Lassus and Viollet-le-Duc documenting the street level rise since the construction of Notre-Dame

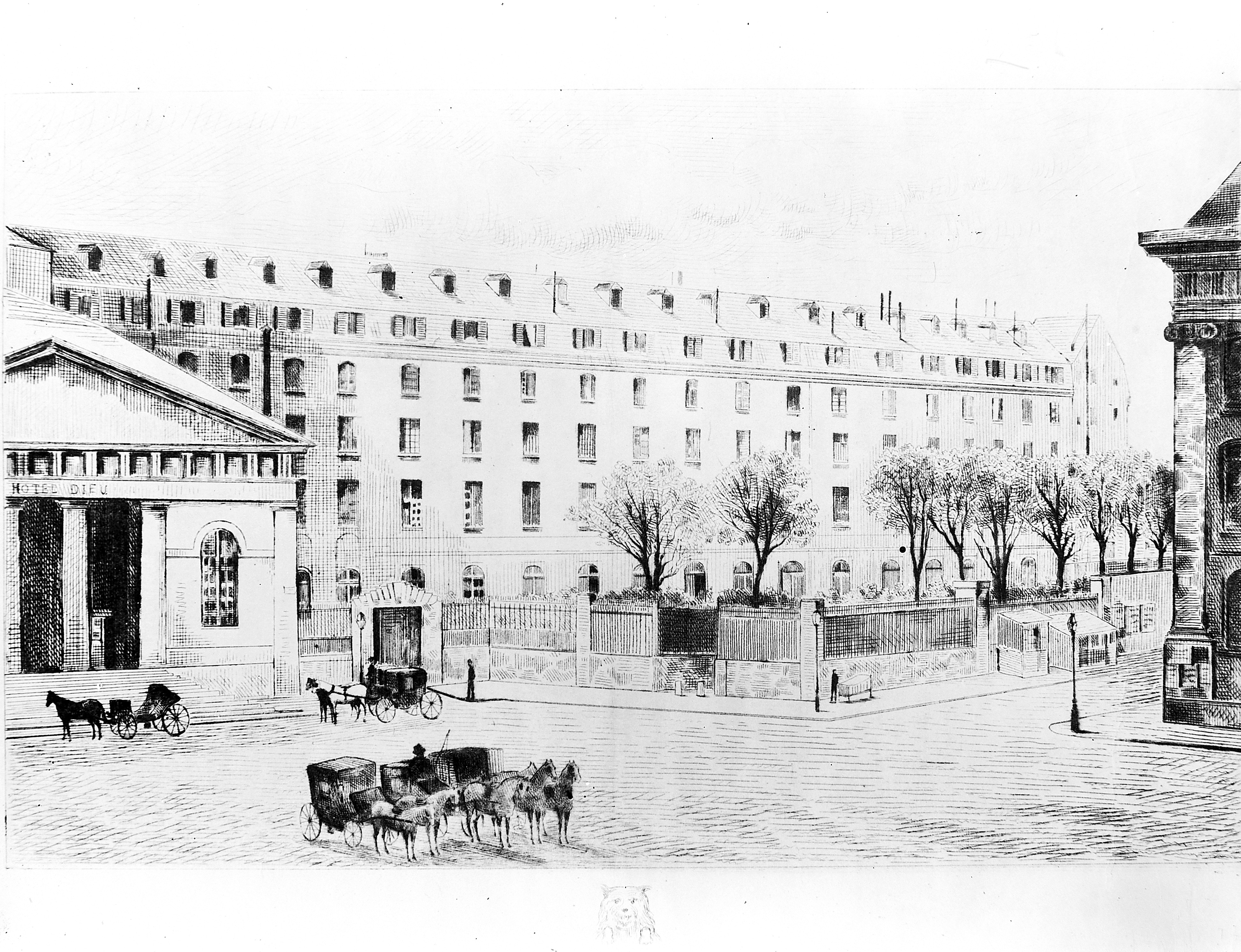
View of the parvis in 1852 facing southwest. Pictured is the Hôtel-Dieu in its old location along the river.

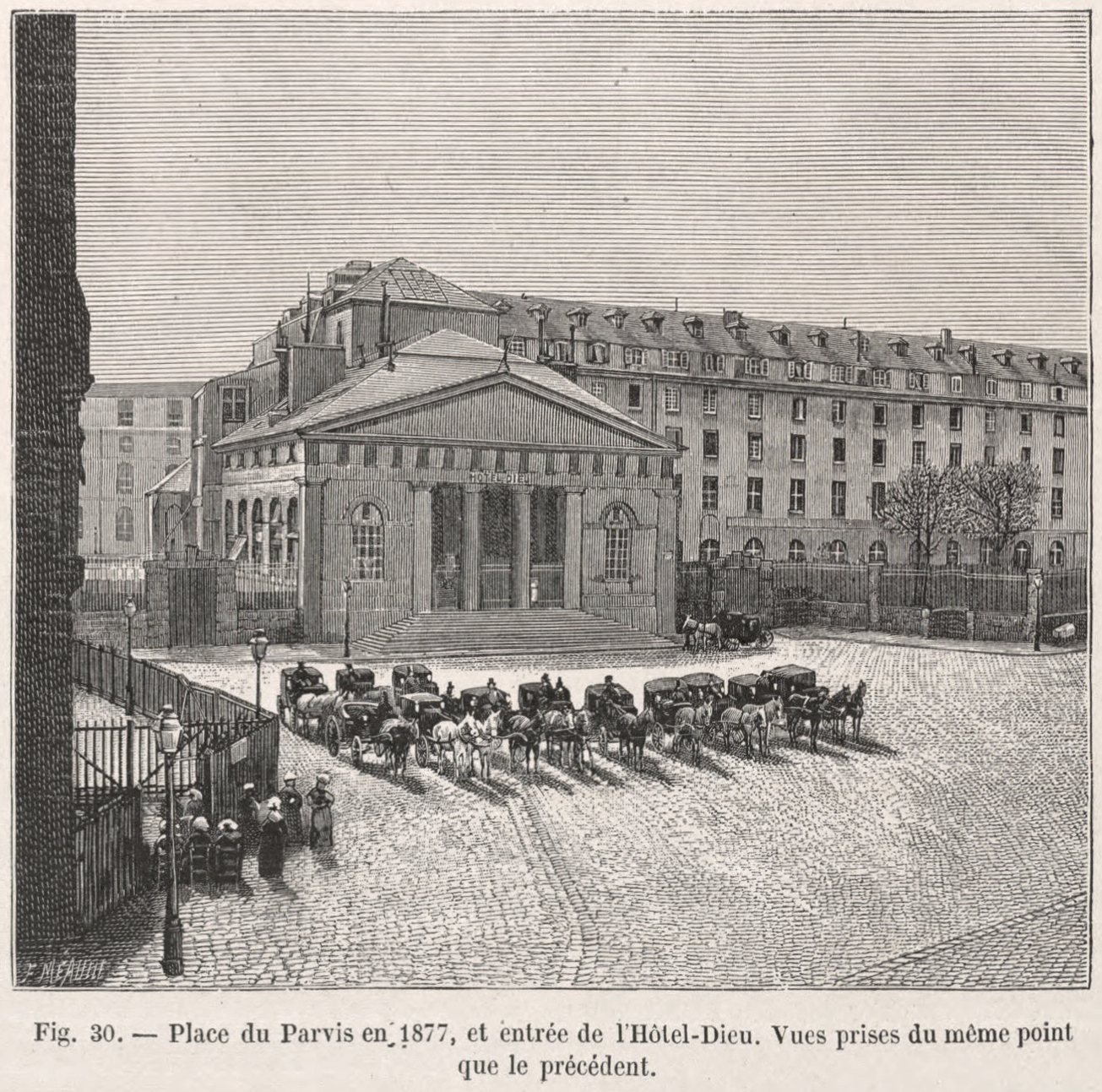
View of the parvis in 1877 facing south

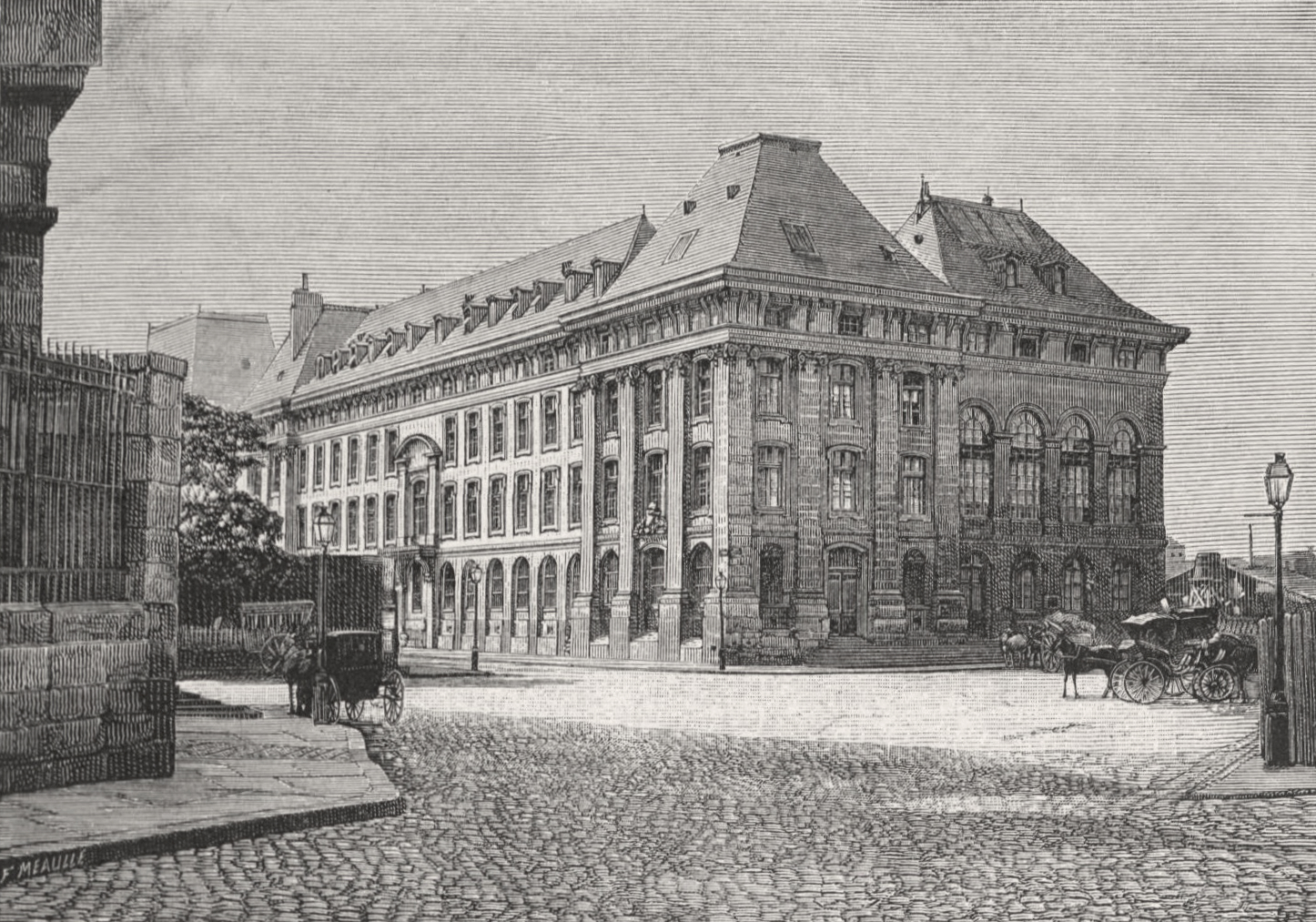
View of the parvis in 1877 facing northwest. Pictured is the Montyon building which was demolished by Haussmann.

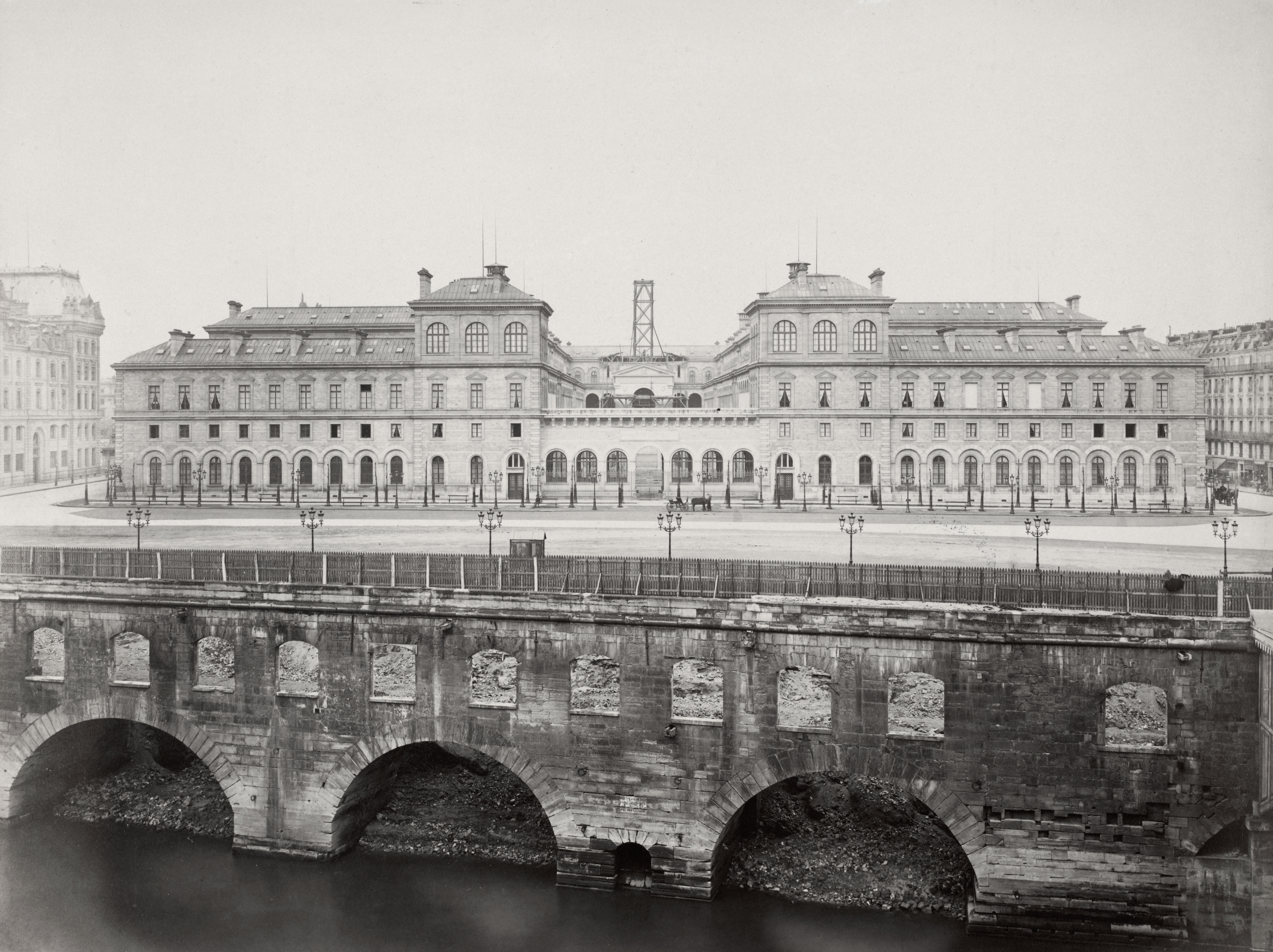
View of the parvis from the left bank facing north showing the newly constructed Hôtel-Dieu

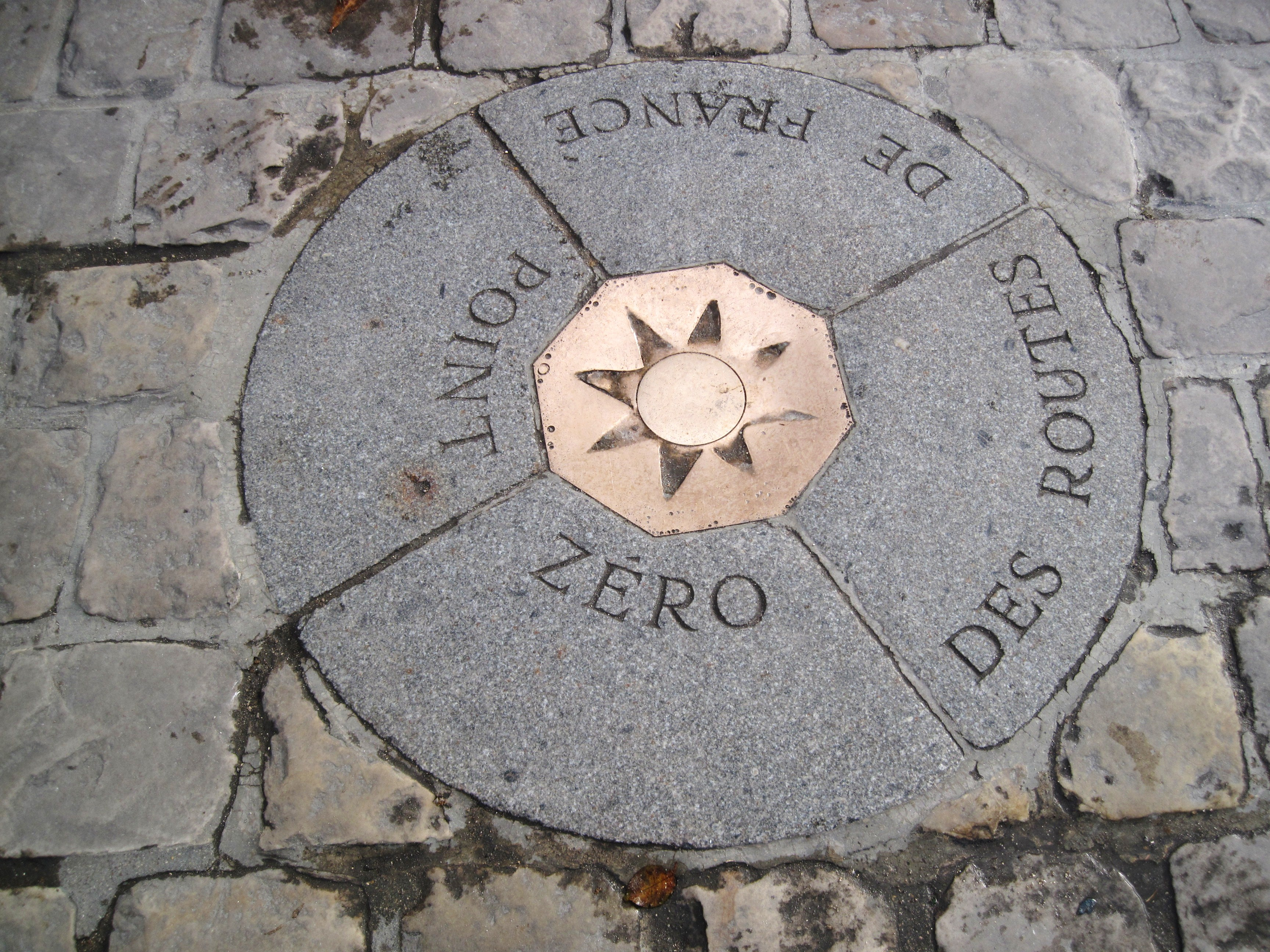
Medallion indicating the Kilometer zero of the French highways, installed in 1924

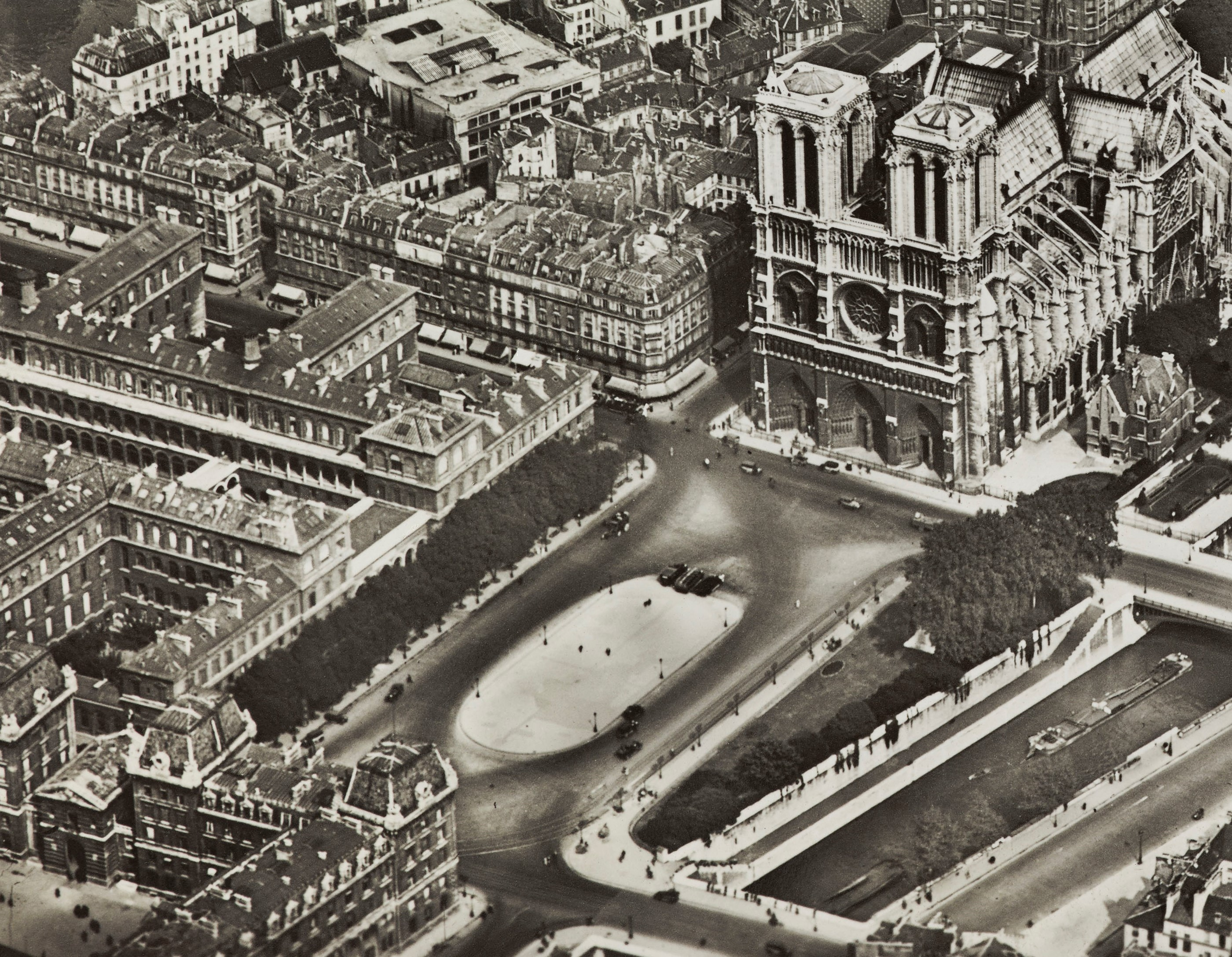
Aerial photo of the parvis taken in 1944. For much of the 20th century, the parvis was a major thoroughfare for vehicles. The tram line is visible on the south side of the square.

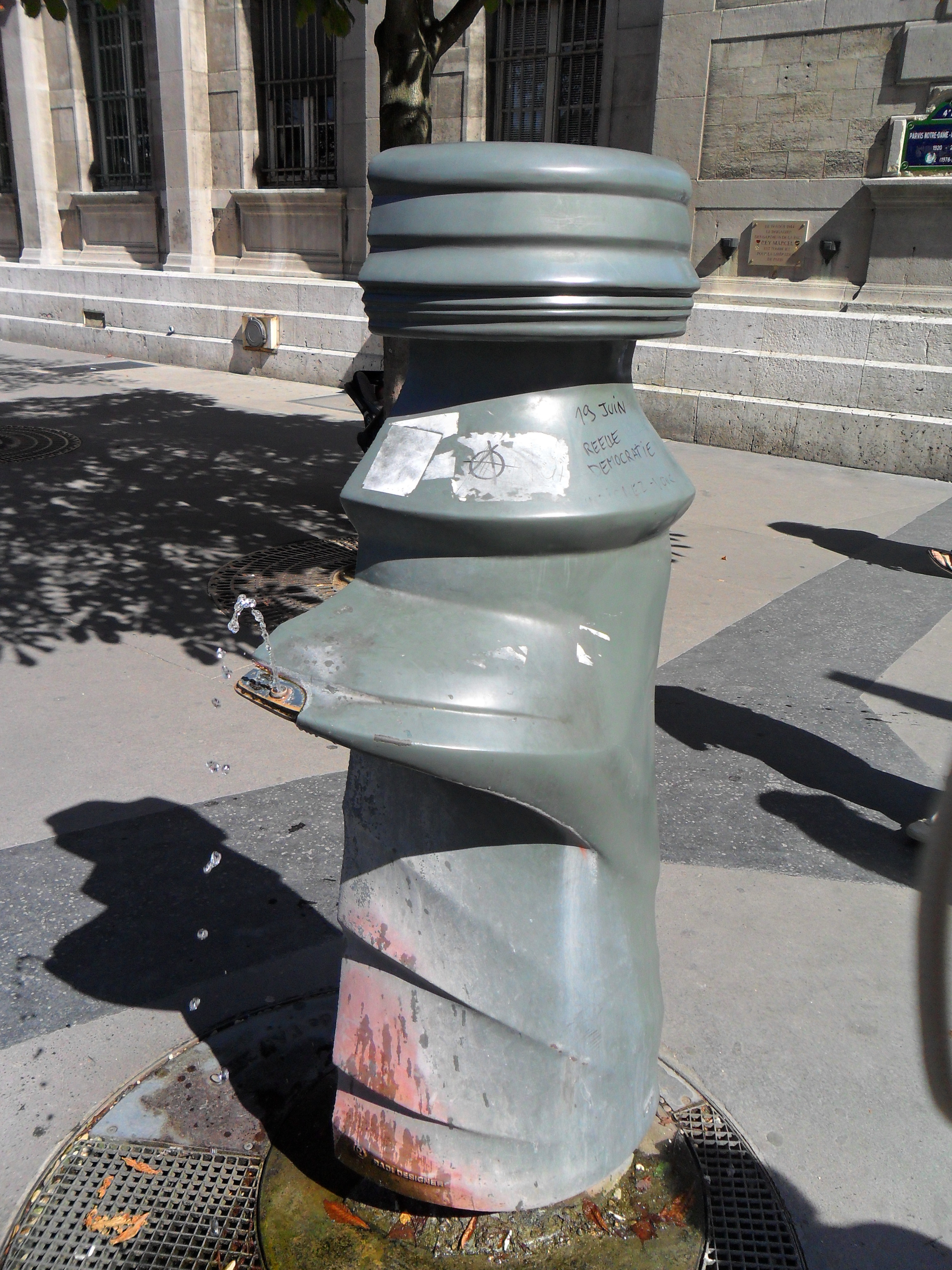
One of the five Millenium fountains installed throughout Paris in 2000. This fountain is situated on the corner of the Rue d'Arcole and the parvis.

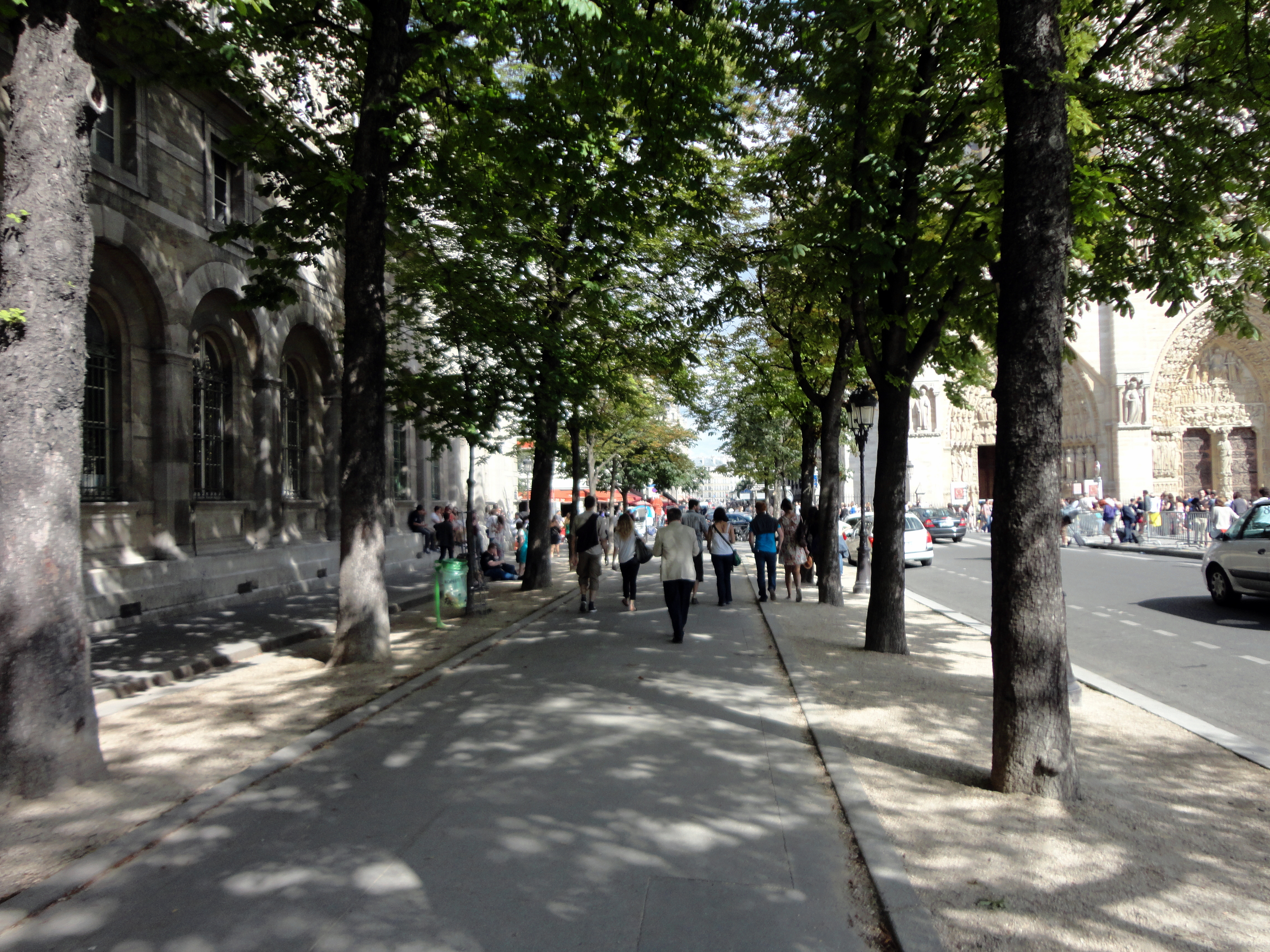
2012: The north side of the square has a walking path lined with horse chestnut trees.

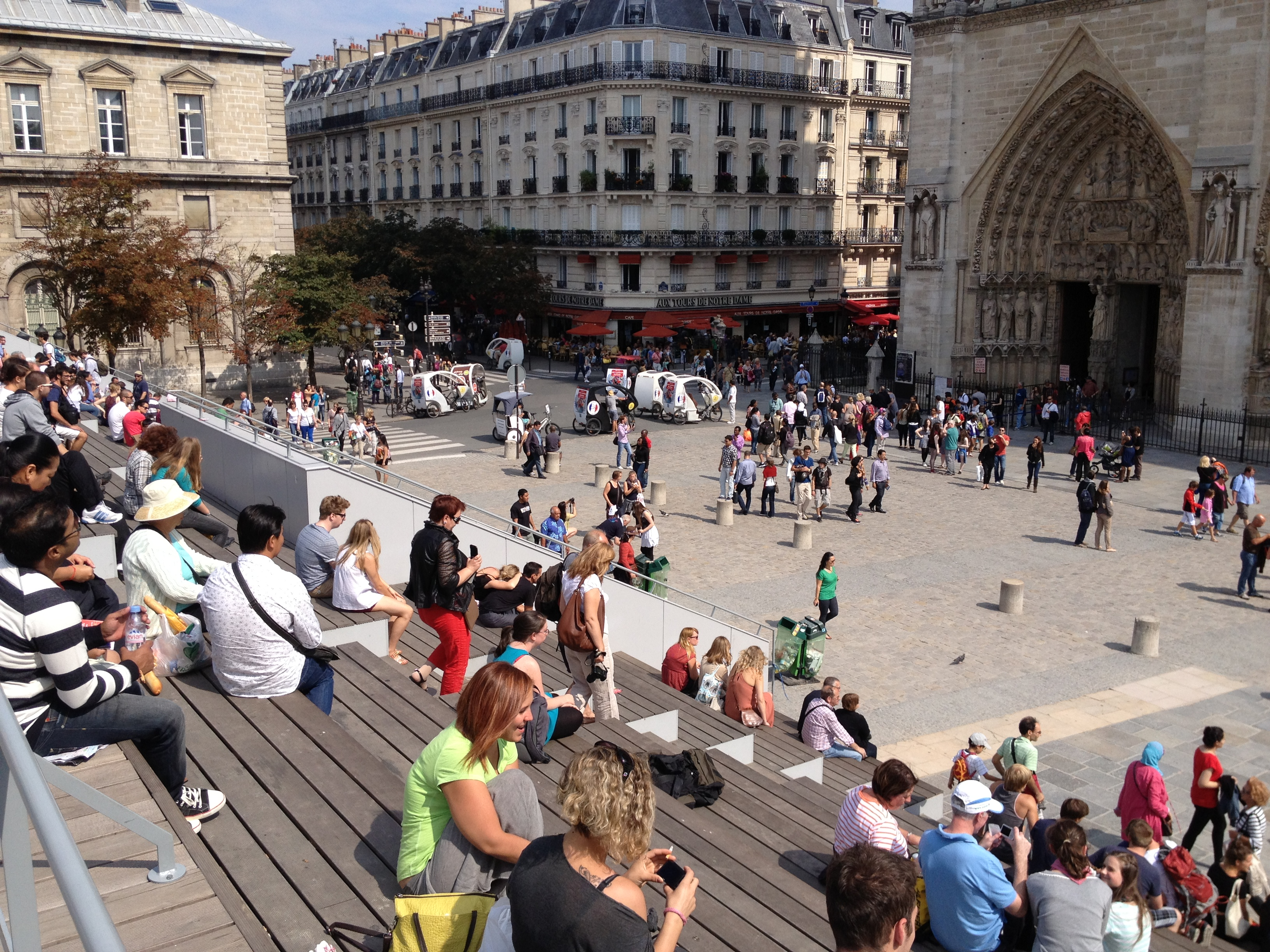
Bleachers were erected on the parvis in 2013 as part of Notre-Dame's 850th anniversary.

== See also ==
- Squares in Paris
- Media related to Parvis Notre-Dame - place Jean-Paul-II (Paris) at Wikimedia Commons
