= Marguerite Putsage =

Belgian artist

Marguerite Émilie Julie Putsage
- Born: 15 November 1868; Mons, Hainaut, Belgium
- Died: 22 September 1946 (aged 77); Brussels, Brabant, Belgium
- Known for: Painting, Sculpture

Marguerite Émilie Julie Putsage (1868–1946) was a Belgian artist, particularly known for her portraits and flower paintings.

== Biography ==
Putsage was born on 15 November 1868 in Mons, the daughter of Jules Maximilien Joseph Putsage and Marie Thérèse Philippine De Puydt. Her father was director of the Union du Crédit in Mons. She was a student of Auguste Danse, and was also artistically influenced by Louis Devillez, a family friend, and by Eugène Carrière, whose work she greatly admired. She taught an art history course at the École des Mines (which later became the Faculté polytechnique de Mons).

She died in Brussels on 22 September 1946. Her work is in the collection of Beaux-Arts Mons (BAM), as well as public museums in Ghent and Ixelles.

== Gallery ==
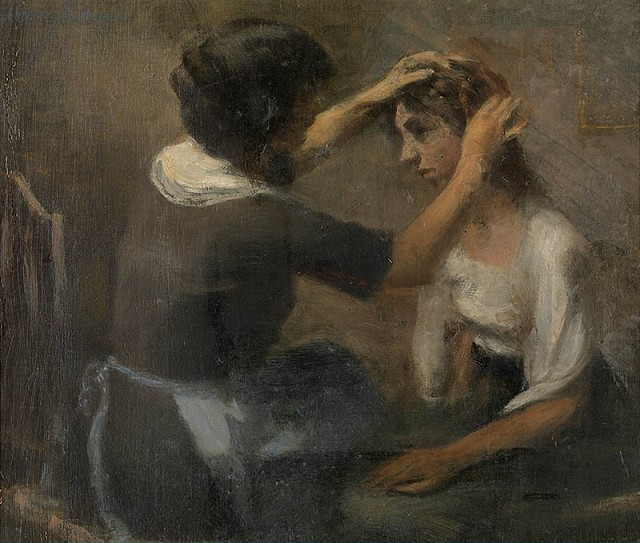
The Hairdresser

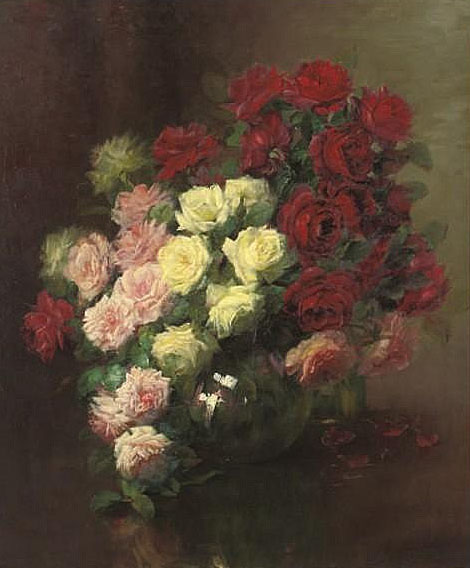
Roses in a bowl

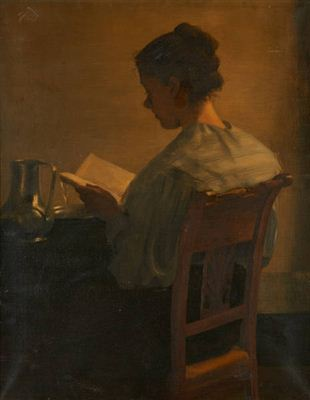
Reading
