= Louis Jehotte =

Belgian sculptor (1803/4–1884)

Louis Jehotte

Louis Jehotte (7 November 1803 or 1804 – 3 February 1884) was a Belgian sculptor working in a realist tradition that was inflected, responsible for the bronze equestrian monument to Charlemagne erected on the Boulevard d'Avroy in Liège, Belgium, in 1867. His bronze Cain Cursed stands outside the Academy Palace, and his statue of Prince Charles Alexander of Lorraine on the current Place du Musée/Museumplein, both in Brussels.

His father Léonard Jehotte (Herstal, 1 August 1772 – Maastricht, 1 August (!) 1851) was an engraver at the mint, in Liège. Louis was born in Paris. and studied at the Académie de dessin at Liège under François Joseph Dewandre. He taught sculpture at the Brussels Académie Royale des Beaux-Arts.

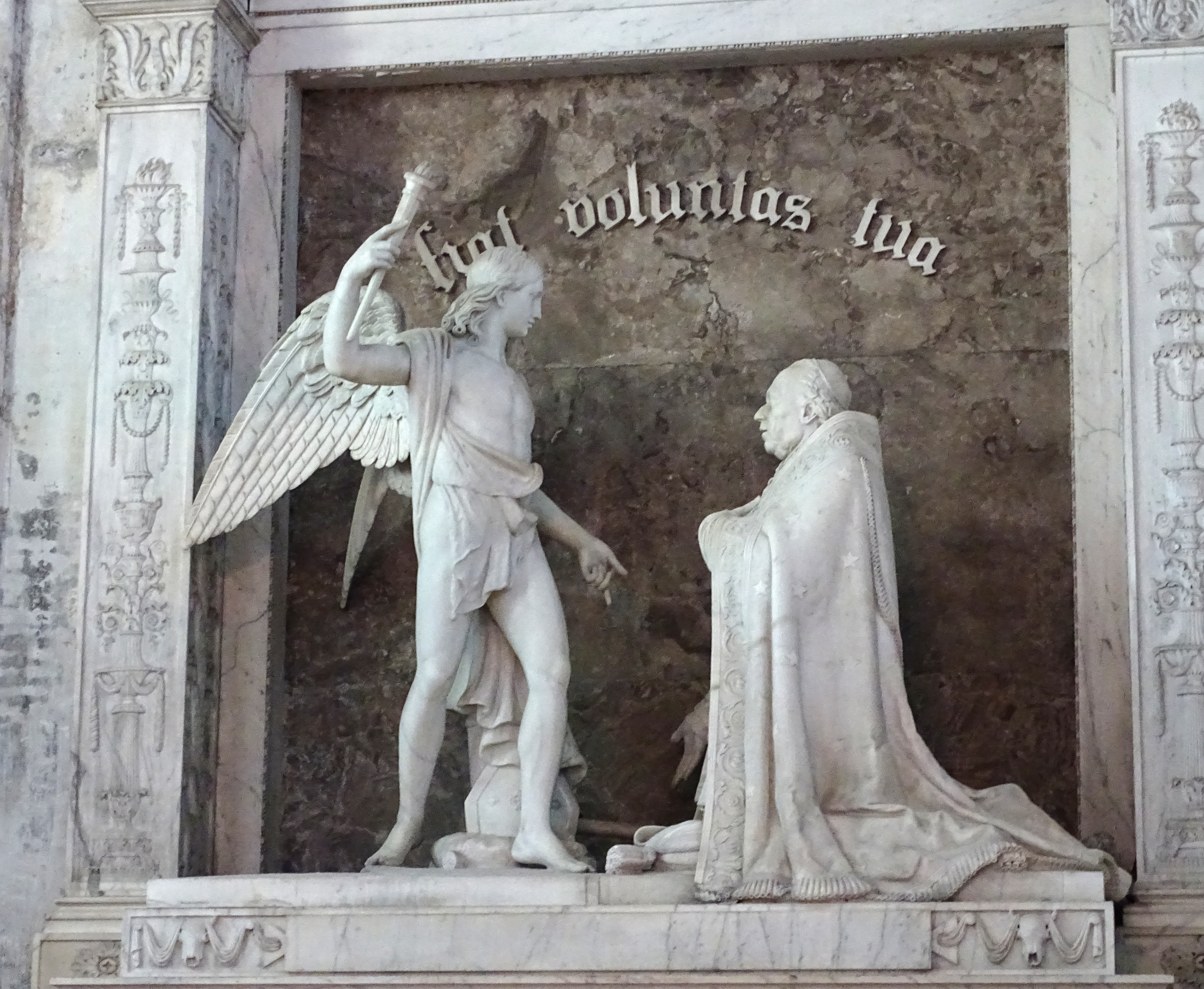
Monument for Franciscus de Méan in Mechelen

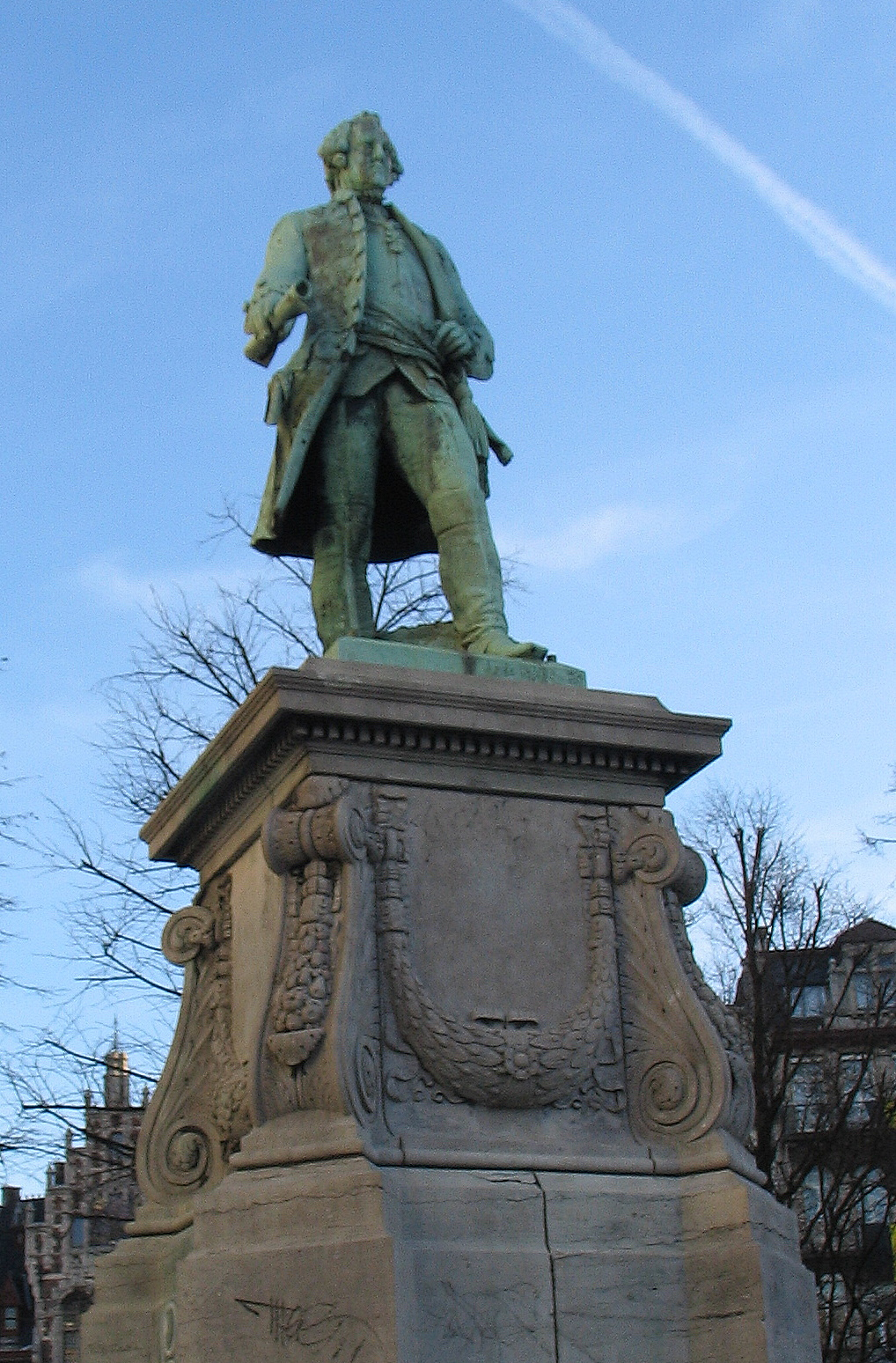
Prince Charles Alexander of Lorraine (1848, Brussels)

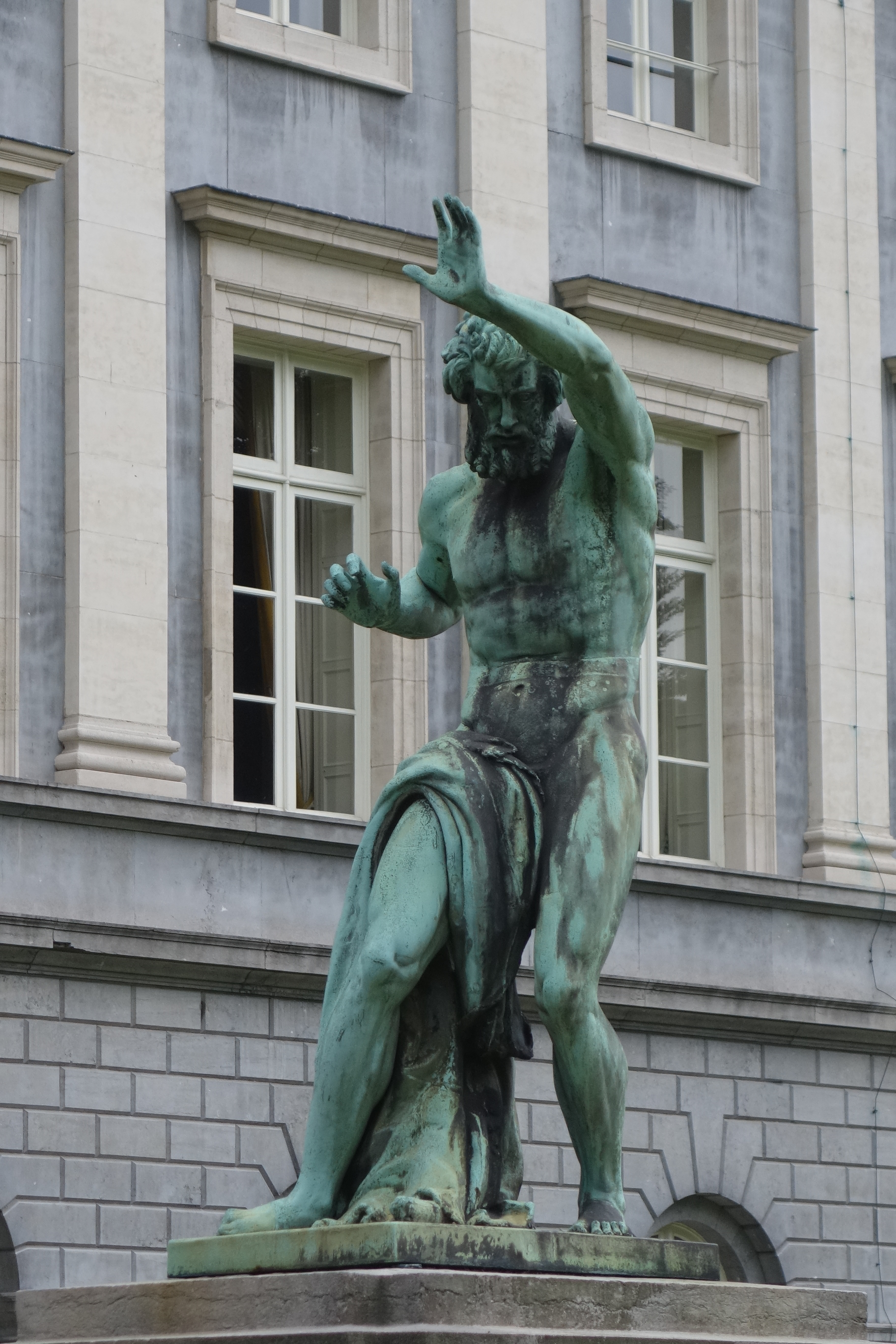
Cain cursed in Brussels

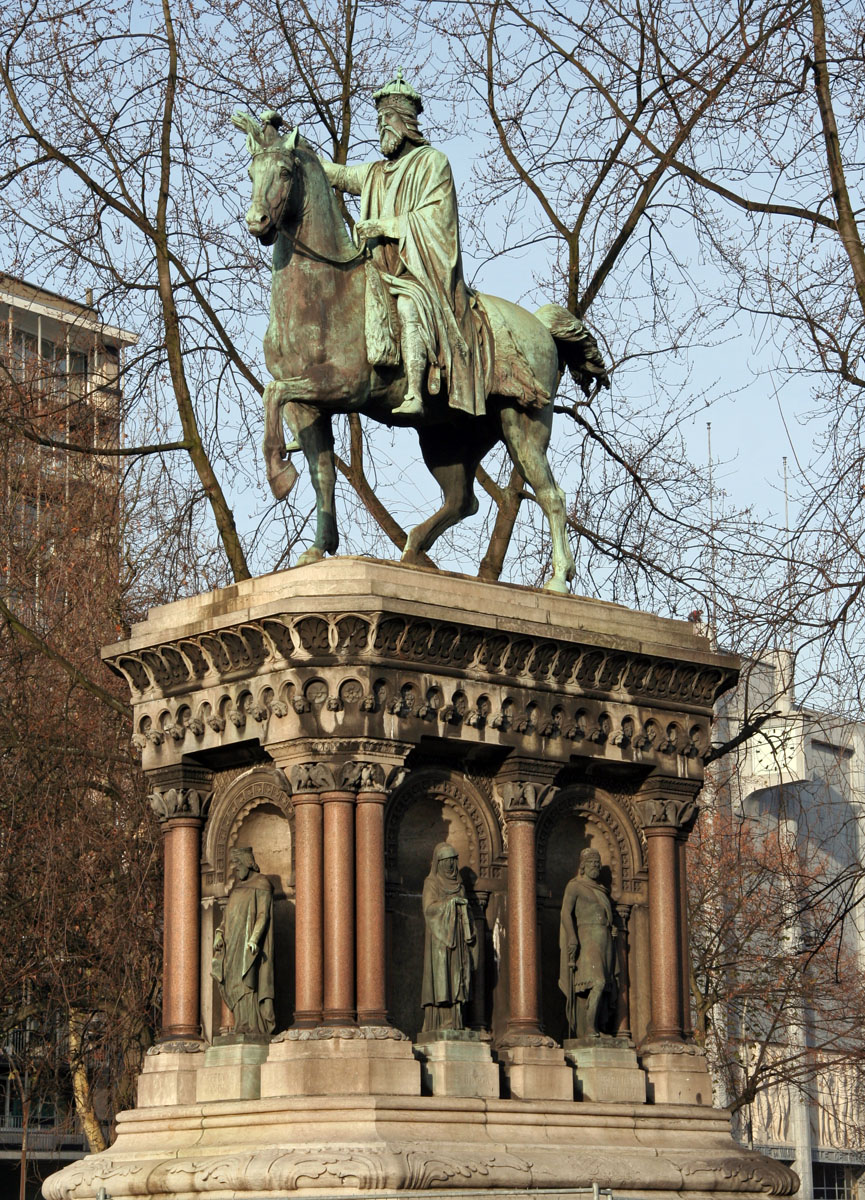
Statue of Charlemagne in Liège
