= Charlemagne et ses Leudes =

Monumental sculpture in Paris, France

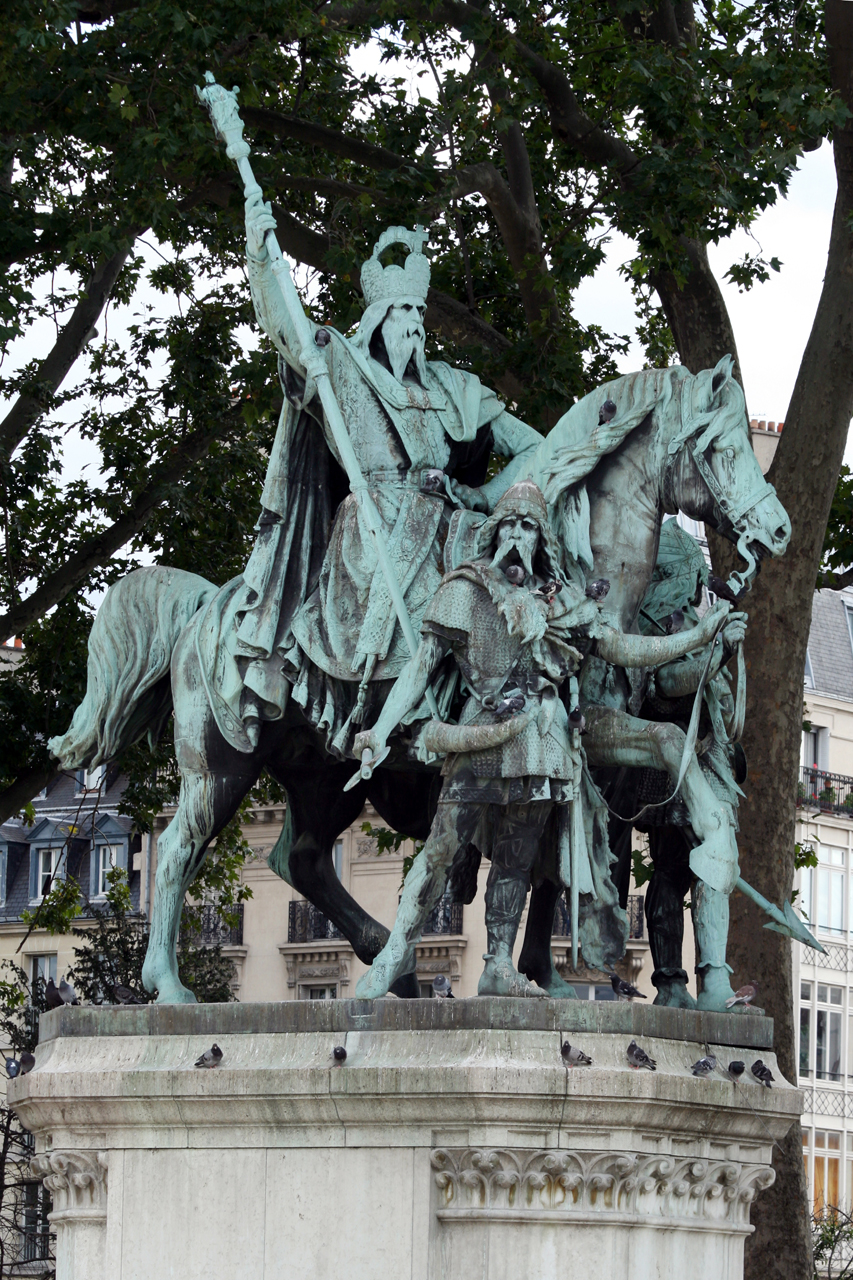
- View of the statue from the Notre-Dame plaza
- Interactive map of Charlemagne et ses Leudes
- Location: Paris, France
- Coordinates: 48.8531°N 2.348215°E
- Designer: Louis and Charles Rochet
- Type: Equestrian statue
- Completion date: 1878

Charlemagne et ses Leudes, generally translated as Charlemagne and His Guards or Charlemagne and His Paladins, is a monumental bronze statue situated on the plaza (parvis) in front of Notre-Dame, in the 4th arrondissement of Paris, France. A joint work by the brothers Louis Rochet (1813-1878) and Charles Rochet (1815-1900), it was cast at the art foundry Fonderie Thiébaut Frères.

== Name ==
Leude is a word associated with the Merovingian era, referring to a Frankish aristocrat who has pledged fidelity to the monarch and belongs to his retinue. It is synonymous of antrustion.

== History ==
The Rochet brothers first conceived the project of a monument to Charlemagne in 1853. They initially intended it for Aachen. They presented a plaster version at the Universal Exposition of 1867.

The completed bronze group was exhibited at the Universal Exposition of 1878 shortly after the death of Louis Rochet. By that time, however, the political climate was much less favorable to the celebration of Charlemagne given the latter's monarchical and German associations. Charles Rochet offered to cover the cost of the 15-ton group's erection in order to facilitate its location on a suitable Parisian site. On Eugène Viollet-le-Duc's recommendation and after some controversy, the Paris municipal council accepted the offer in January 1879 and endorsed the Parvis Notre-Dame as a "provisional" location. The group was erected there in 1882, on a wooden pedestal designed by Viollet-le-Duc.

Eventually the City of Paris acquired the ownership of the statue in 1895 and reimbursed the founders. In 1908 the current pedestal was built in stone. Unlike many bronze statues in Paris and elsewhere, the monument was spared by the German occupiers during World War II because of Charlemagne's salience in their own nationalistic ideology. In 1973, its replacement by the Pillar of the Boatmen and relocation to Metz were debated, but not implemented.

== Description and interpretation ==
The statue is located on the south side of the Parvis Notre-Dame – Place Jean-Paul-II, close to the river Seine on the right-hand side when facing Notre-Dame cathedral.

Charlemagne is represented in old age, wearing the Imperial Crown of the Holy Roman Empire and brandishing the Scepter of Charles V, traditionally known as "Scepter of Charlemagne". He is guarded by Oliver, who guides his horse, and by Roland, both looking out for potential enemies on the sides. Roland carries his trademark olifant, a double-headed axe (technically a labrys but known in 19th-century France as a francisca and mythically associated with the ancient Franks), and his legendary Durendal, modeled on the sword of the same name kept at the Royal Armoury of Madrid. Oliver is also heavily armed, carrying a Frankish scramasax and holding a pike. The two standing figures' watchfulness creates a sense of foreboding that presages their heroic demise at the battle of Roncevaux Pass. At the same time, Charlemagne's majestic and confident attitude points to his achievements beyond the two paladins' sacrifice, and to his enduring legacy.

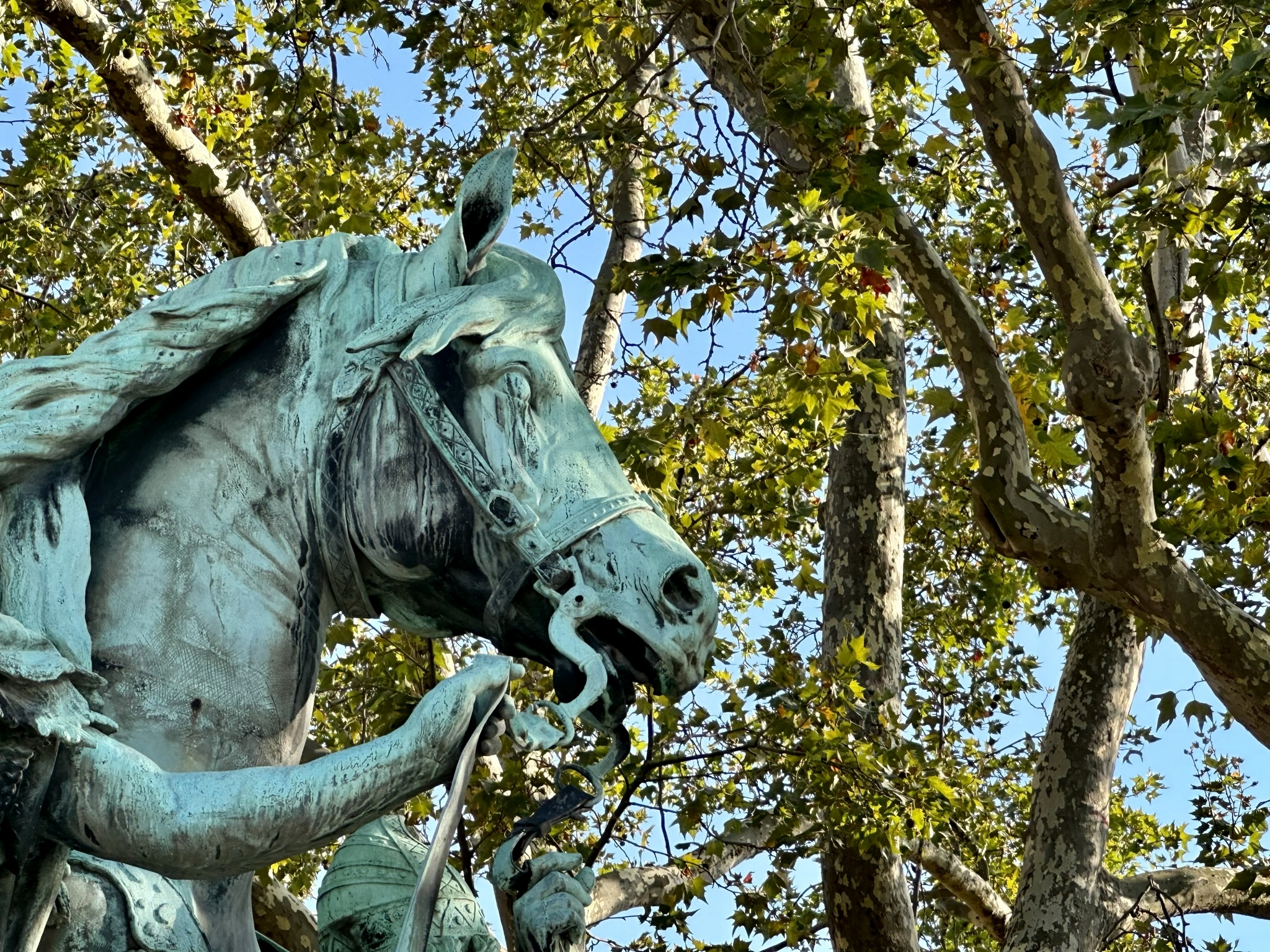
Detail of the monument's horse

The representation is fictional and anachronistic on multiple levels, which was probably intentional to emphasize its allegorical character. The two Leudes' hairstyles and clothes are those traditionally associated with Gauls or Merovingians rather than late-8th-century Franks. The legend has them both dying in 778, when Charlemagne was still young and a generation before he would be crowned Emperor. Charlemagne's insignia of power were not to be carried on the battlefield. The Imperial Crown, in any case, was not created until more than a century after Charlemagne's death. As for the scepter, it dates from the 14th century.

The composition abounds in political and nationalistic symbolism, reflecting the Rochet brothers' intent to claim Charlemagne's legacy for France and Napoleon III in alignment with the ideology of the Second French Empire. The implied claim of imperial affinity between Charlemagne and Napoleon was a way to downplay the prominence of the Capetian dynasty in the centuries in between, and thus to neuter the pretentions of the French royalist parties of the time: Orléanists with Philippe, Count of Paris, and Legitimists with Henri, Count of Chambord. Simultaneously, the presence of Roland and Oliver anchor Charlemagne in French territory and tradition against the competing claims of Belgium, then a young nation in search of iconic heroes of its own, and especially of Germany, which was starting its unification process at the same time as the statue was being designed. The theatrical gesture of Charlemagne, holding his "French" scepter above his "German" crown, can be viewed as significant along those lines.

== See also ==
- List of equestrian statues in France
- Statue of Charlemagne (Liège)
- Iconography of Charlemagne
