= Saint-Étienne-du-Mont =

Church in Paris, France

Église Saint-Étienne-du-Mont
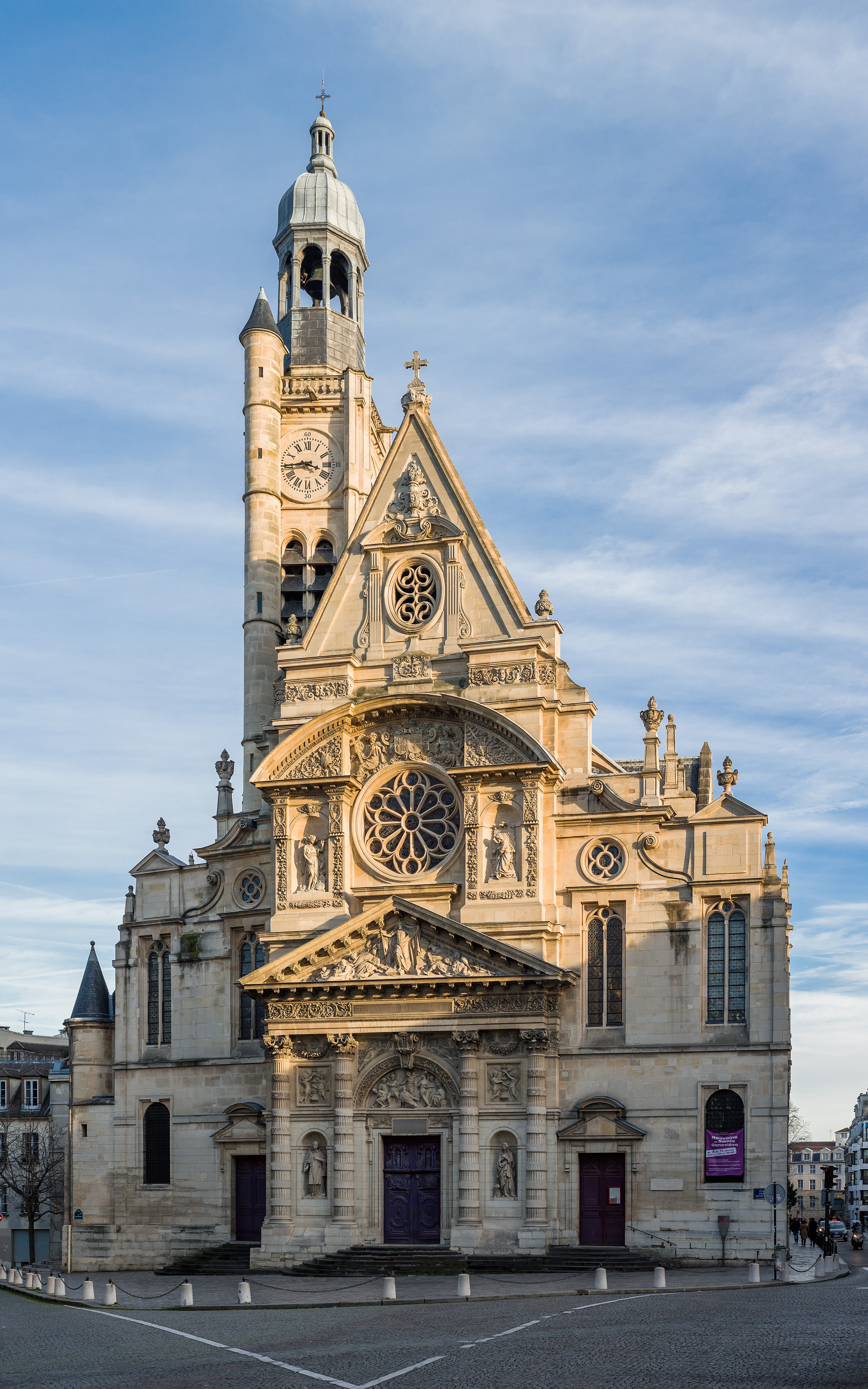
- Overview of the building

Religion
- Affiliation: Catholic Church
- Province: Archdiocese of Paris

Location
- Location: Montagne Sainte-Geneviève, 5th arrondissement of Paris
- Interactive map of Église Saint-Étienne-du-Mont
- Coordinates: 48°50′47″N 2°20′53″E

Architecture
- Type: Church
- Style: French Gothic, French Renaissance
- Groundbreaking: 1494
- Completed: 1624

Saint-Étienne-du-Mont (French pronunciation: [sɛ̃t‿etjɛn dy mɔ̃]) is a Catholic church in Paris, France, on the Montagne Sainte-Geneviève in the 5th arrondissement, near the Panthéon. It contains the shrine of St. Geneviève, the patron saint of Paris. The church also contains the tombs of Blaise Pascal and Jean Racine. Jean-Paul Marat is buried in the church's cemetery. Maurice Duruflé was titular church organist from 1929 to 1975.

== History ==
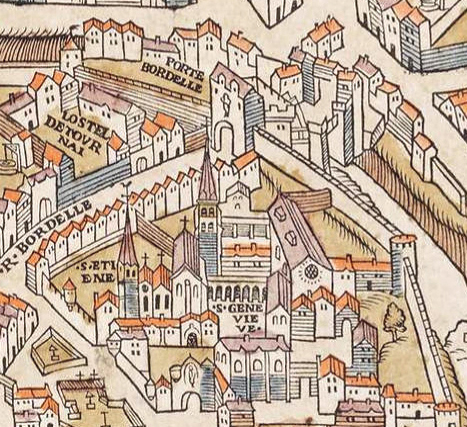
The early church (left) on the 1550 map of Paris

During the Gallo-Roman era, the Parisii tribe of Lutetia gradually settled a hill on the left bank of the Seine, called Mount Lucotecius. This land was less marshy than their earlier settlement by the river, and became the site of a theatre, baths and villas. In the 6th century, Clovis, the King of the Franks, built a basilica at the top of the hill, dedicated to the Apostles Peter and Paul. Clovis was buried there, along with his wife Clotilde, and several kings of the Merovingian dynasty. Saint Genevieve, the patron saint of the city, who had defended the city against a barbarian invasion, was also buried there. The Abbey of Sainte-Genevieve was founded next to the church in 502, and the church became part of the abbey.

In 1222, as the population of the neighbourhood grew, and particularly to serve the masters and students of the new College of Sorbonne, Pope Honorius III authorized the establishment of an autonomous church, which was devoted this time to St Etienne, or Saint Stephen. The new church was constructed just to the north of Abbey church.

As more colleges were founded and the neighbourhood continued to grow, the church authorities decided to construct an entirely new and larger church, in the new flamboyant Gothic style. In 1492, the nearby Génovéfain monks donated a portion of their land for the site. Construction proceeded very slowly. The architect Stephen Viguier planned the apse and the bell tower in 1494, and the first two bells were cast in 1500. The choir was completed in 1537, and the altars of the apse chapels were blessed in 1541. but as the work continued, styles also changed. In the same year, contracts were awarded to artisans to complete the windows and sculpture, which were now to be in the new Renaissance style. The nave, also in the Renaissance style, was not finished until 1584. The erection of the façade did not begin until 1610, with the first stone placed by Marguerite de Valois. The church was finally consecrated on 25 February 1626 by Jean-François de Gondi, first archbishop of Paris; the ornate carved pulpit was installed in 1651.

During the 17th and 18th century, the church of Saint-Etienne-du-Mont enjoyed great prestige. It was the starting point of an annual procession, carrying the shrine of Saint Genevieve to Notre Dame de Paris, and back. The remains of a number of prominent scientists and artists were interred there, including Pierre Perrault, the painter Eustache Le Sueur and Blaise Pascal. Those of Racine were transferred in 1711 from Port-Royal in Saint-Etienne. In 1744, King Louis XV decided to replace the nearby abbey with an even larger church, which, after many modifications and changes of purpose, eventually became the Panthéon.

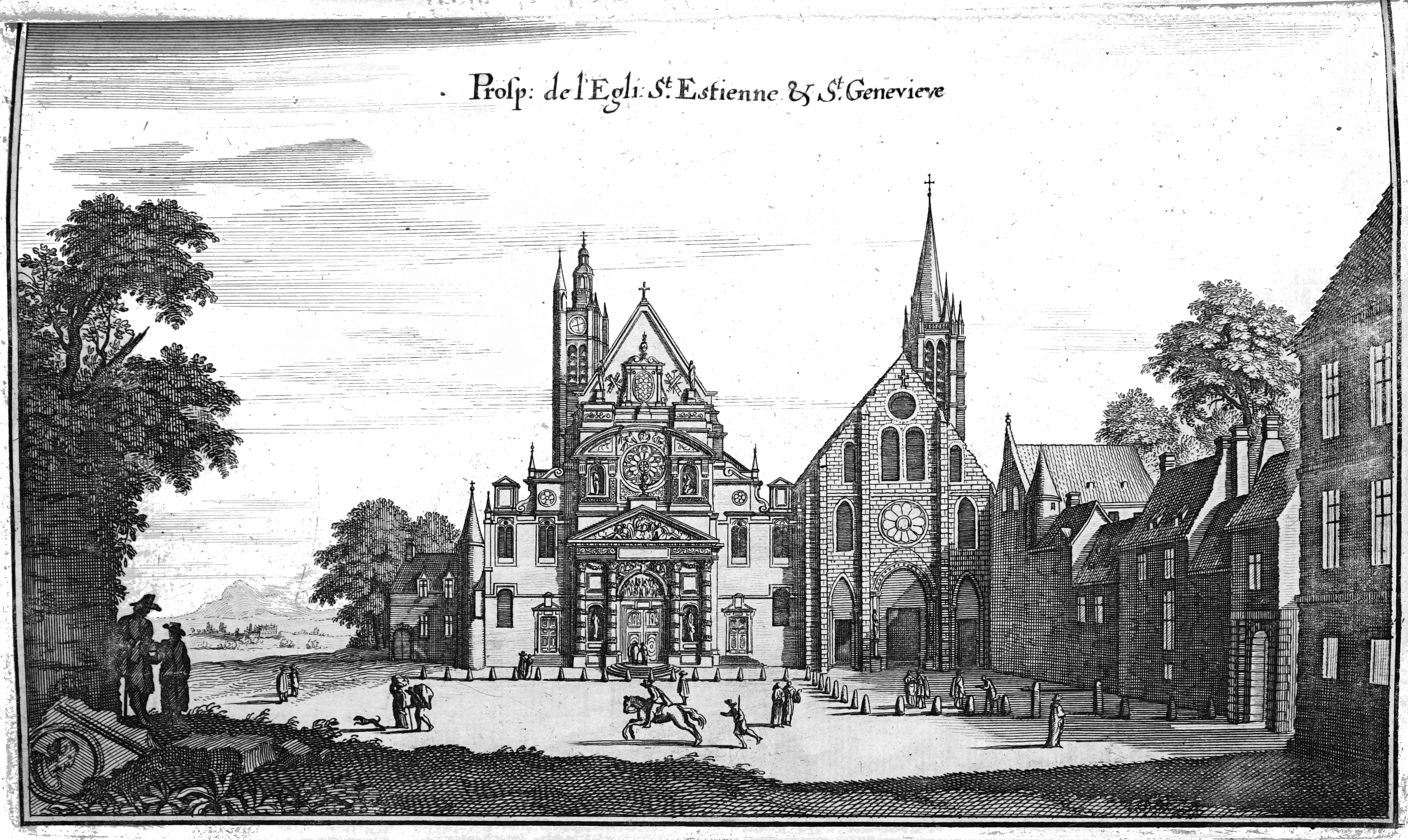
The church (left) and abbey church (right) in 1655

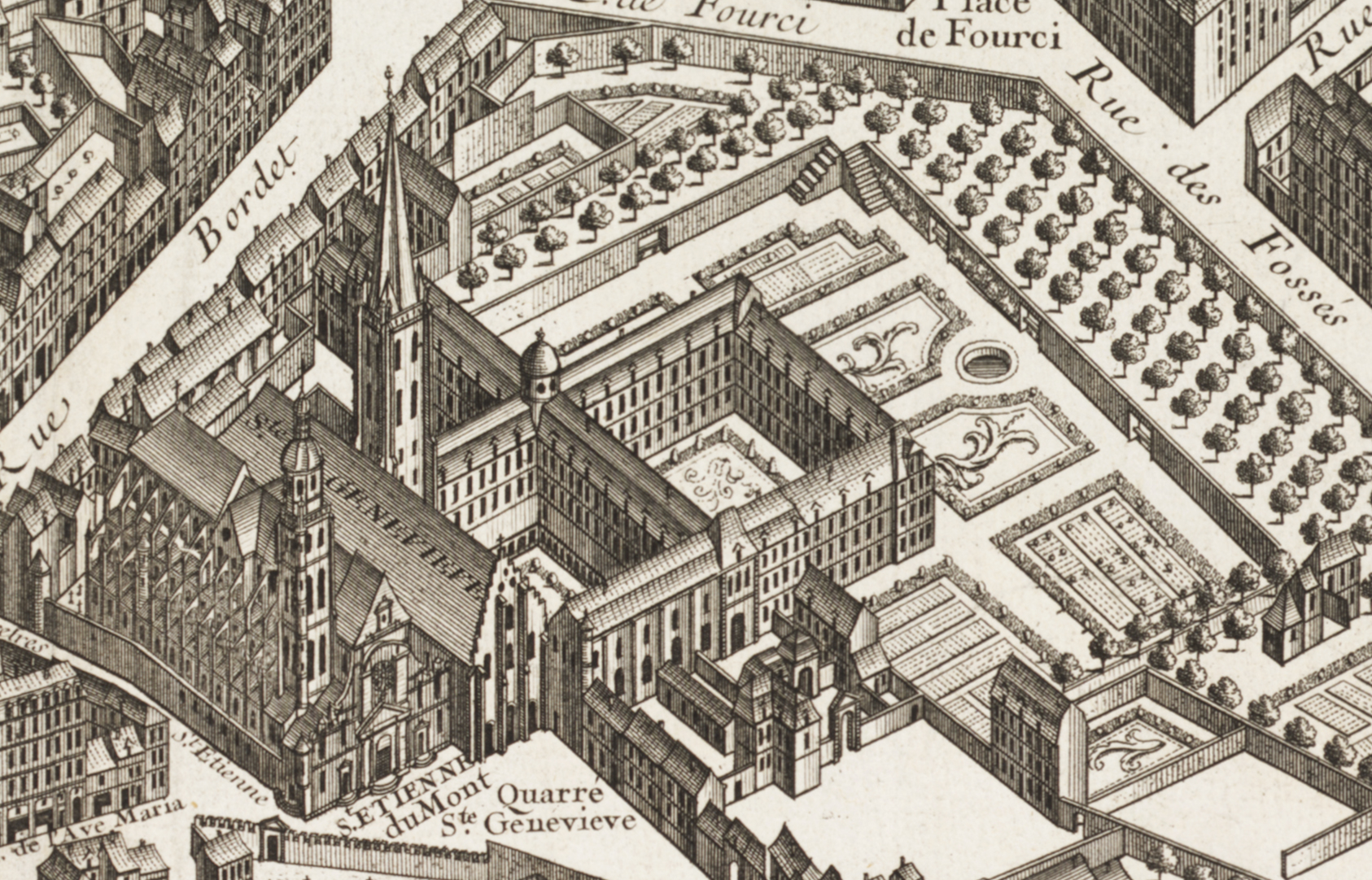
The church (left) in 1739, with the abbey (destroyed) to the right

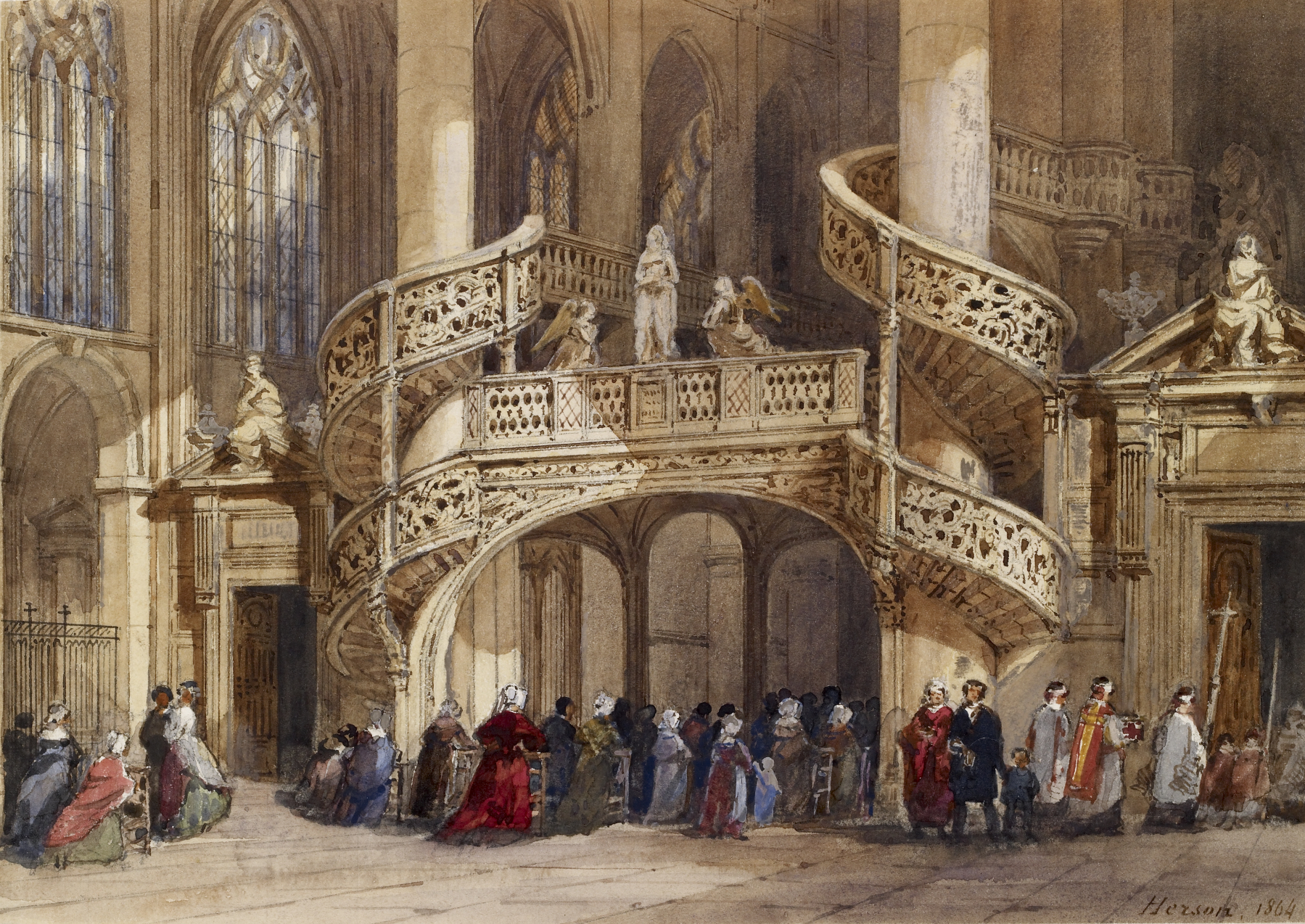
The interior in 1864, during the Second Empire

During the French Revolution, the church was first closed and then turned into a "Temple of Filial Piety." The sculpture, decoration and stained glass suffered extensive damage, and many church treasures and relics disappeared. Catholic worship was finally restored in 1803, under the Concordat of 1801. The neighbouring abbey church was demolished in 1804, and replaced by rue Clovis. Only the old bell tower survived, and is now part of the Lycée Henri IV campus.

Under the Second Empire of Napoleon III, the church was extensively restored by the Paris city architect Victor Baltard between 1865 and 1868. The façade was restored and increased in height and sculpture and stained glass destroyed in Revolution was replaced. He also added a new chapel the Chapel of Catechisms.

== Timeline ==
Building works included:

- 6th century: first chapel was formed from the crypt of St. Geneviève Abbey
- 13th century: separate church built on the north side of chapel
- 1491: bell tower was built
- 1537: chancel was built
- 1545: gallery was built (see image of church interior)
- 1580: vaults of the nave and the transept were built
- 1624: bell tower was raised
- 1807: demolition of the abbey church

== Exterior ==
The west front or façade of the church, in the Renaissance style and in the form of an elongated pyramid of three levels, was built in 1610 following a drawing by Claude Guérin. On the lowest level are four banded, grooved columns of the composite order surrounding the great door. The bas-relief of the tympanum above the door depicts La Lapidation de Saint-Étienne ("The Stoning of Saint Stephen") and above that, the bas-relief within the triangular classical pediment depicts the Resurrection of Christ. The central feature of the second level is a Gothic rose window, under a curvilinear pediment, decorated with sculpture depicting the coat of arms of France and those of the old Abbey. On the top level, the triangular gable features an elliptical rose window.

The tympanum bas-relief, The Stoning of Saint Stephen, was sculpted in 1863 by French sculptor Gabriel-Jules Thomas.

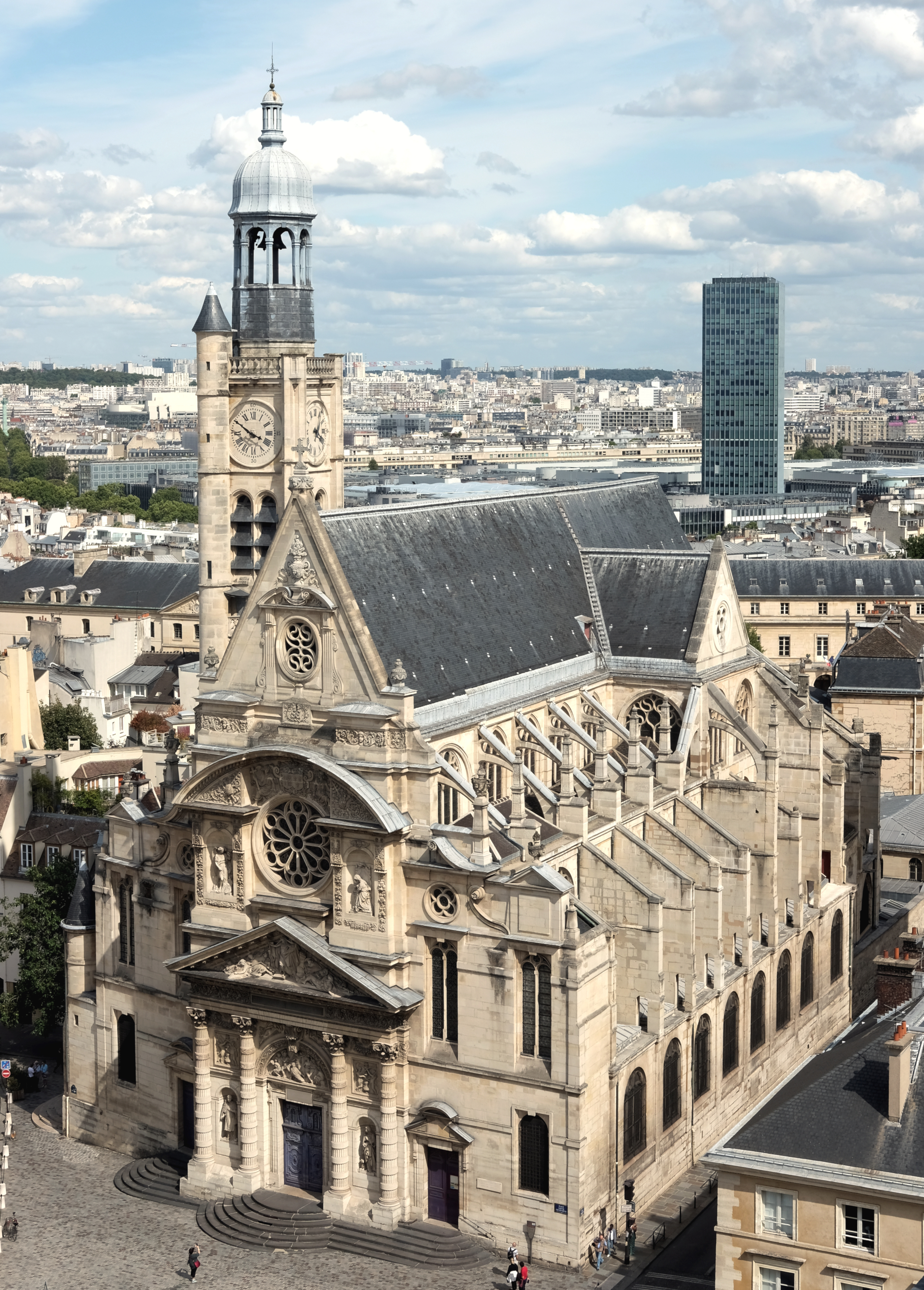
The church seen from the cupola of the Panthéon

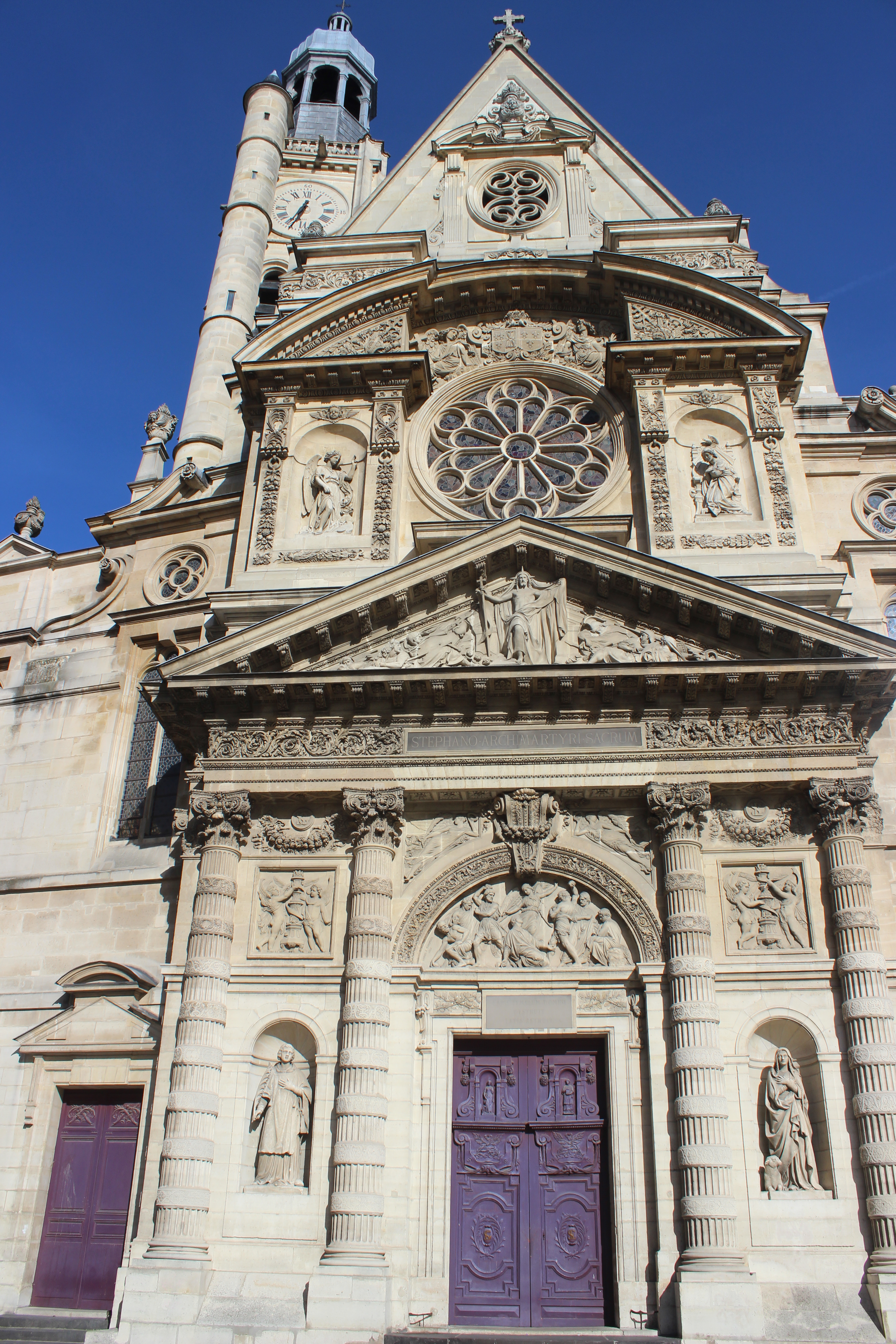
West front

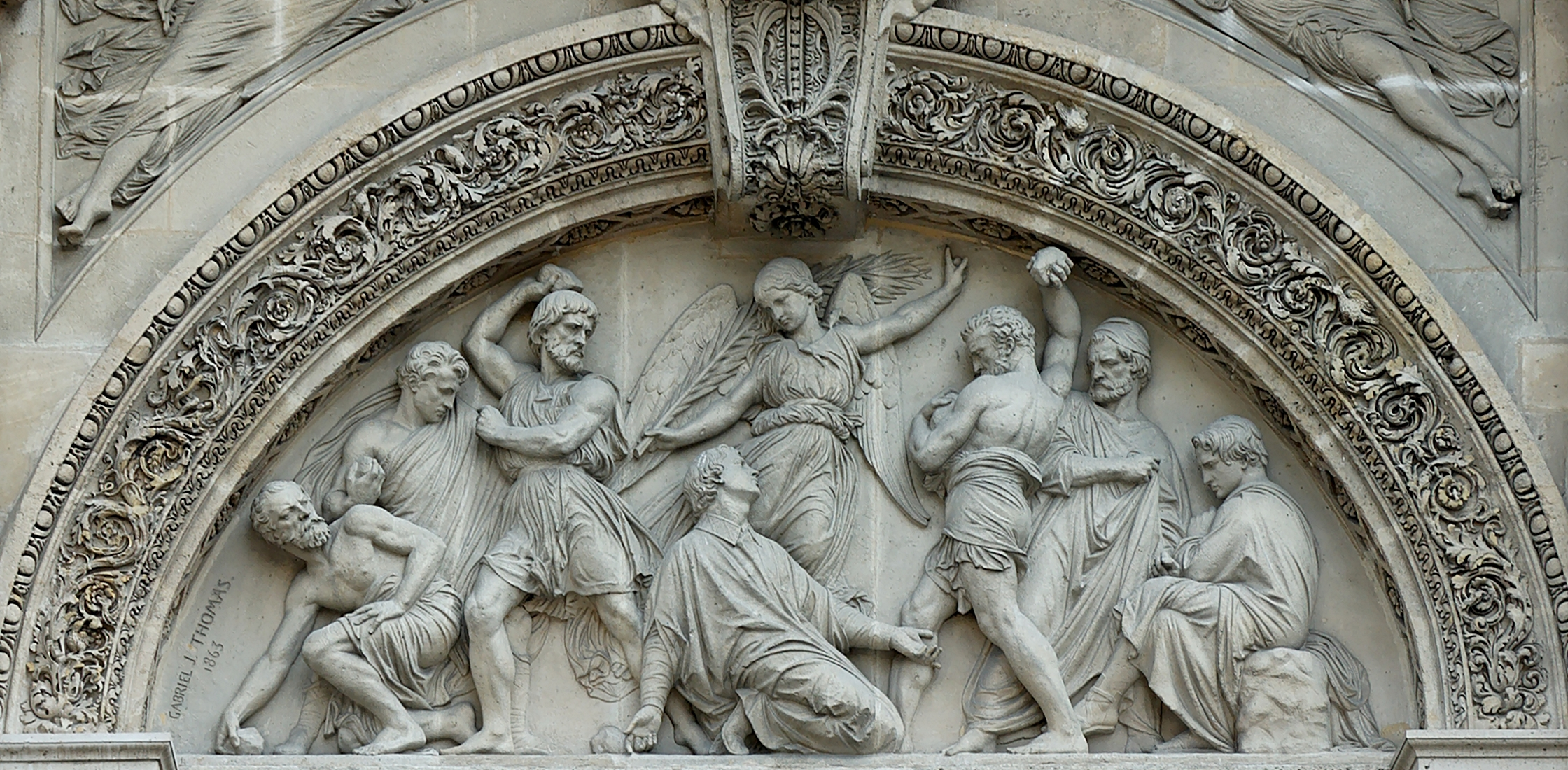
Tympanum of the west portal

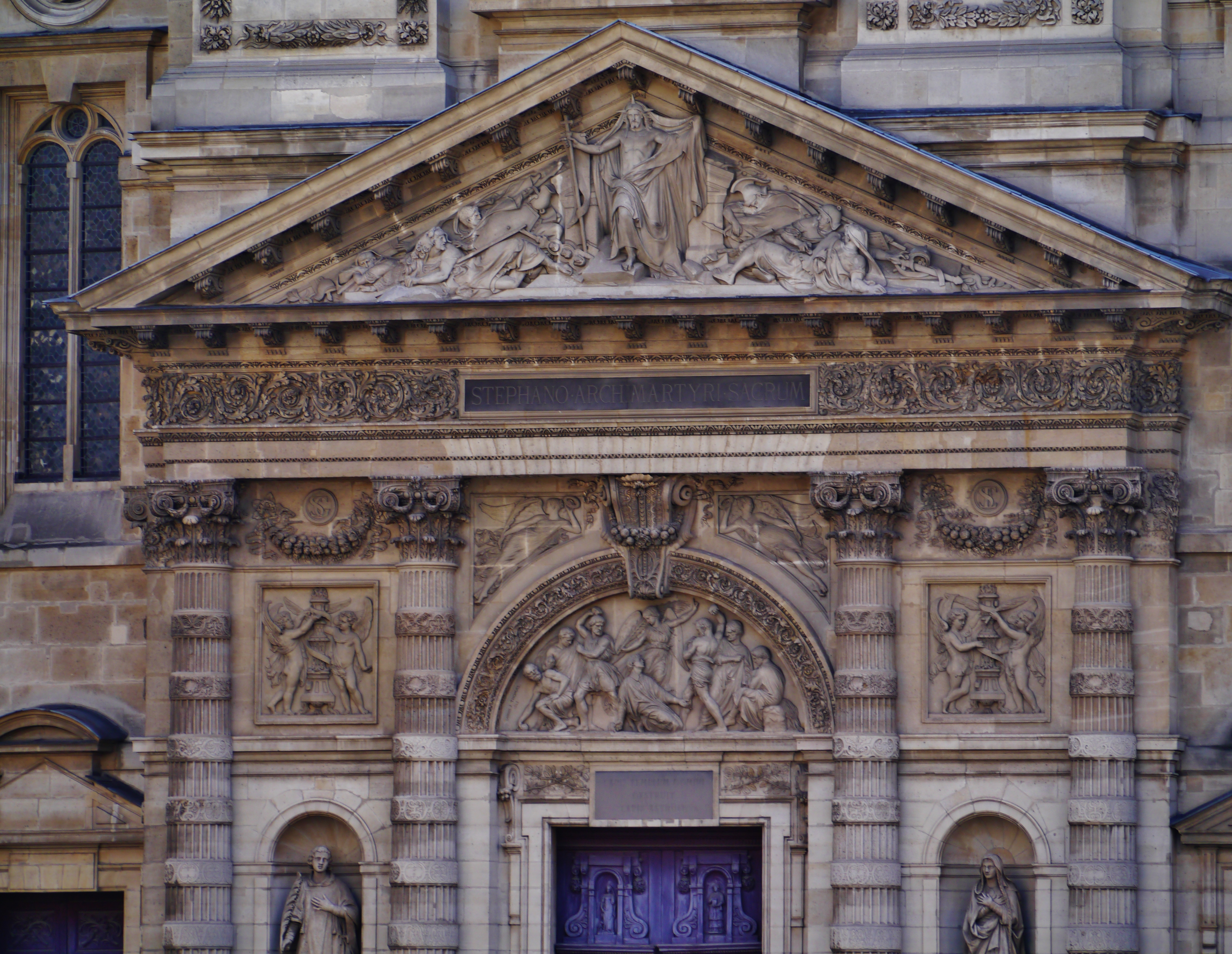
Triangular pediment on the west front

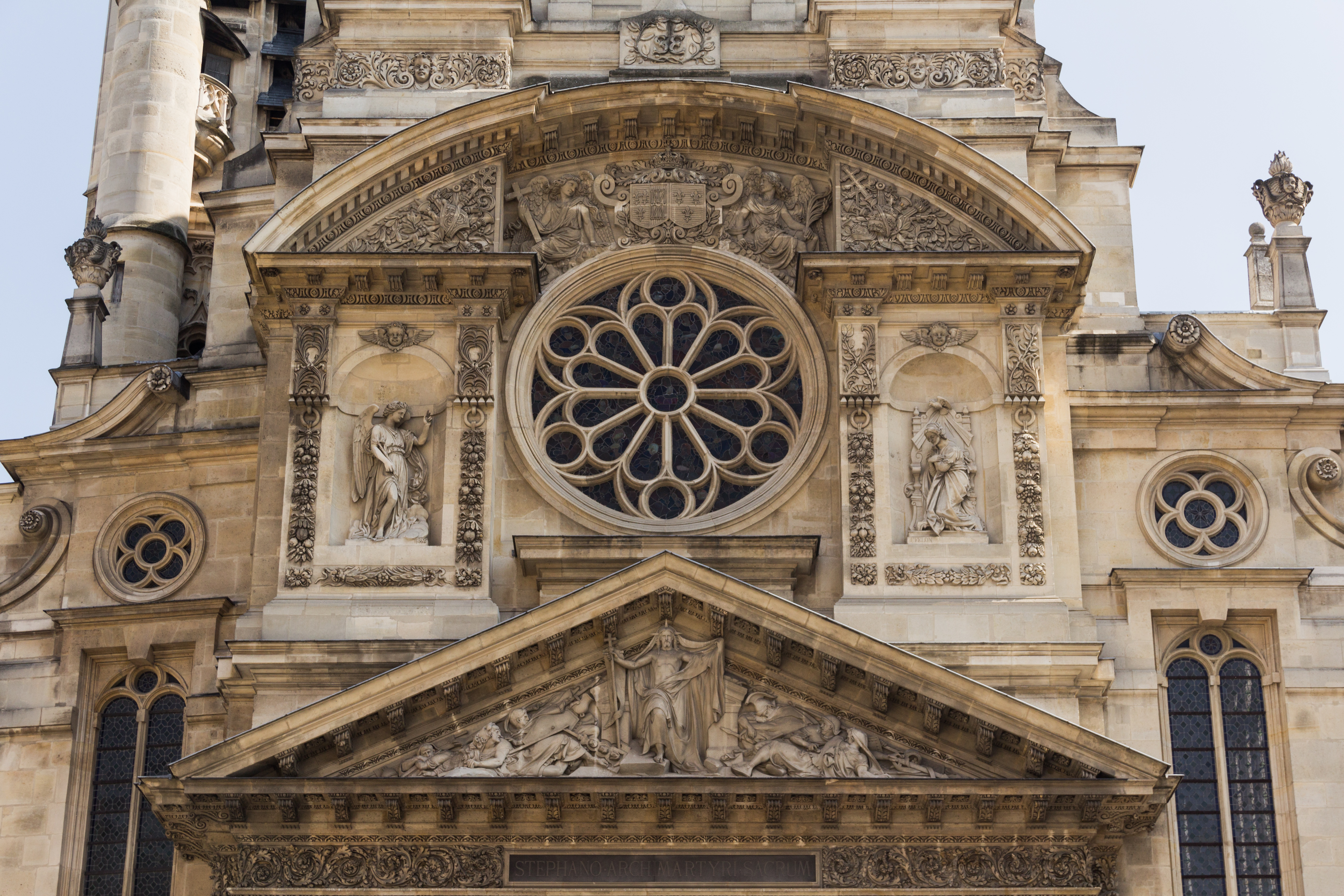
Central portion of the west front

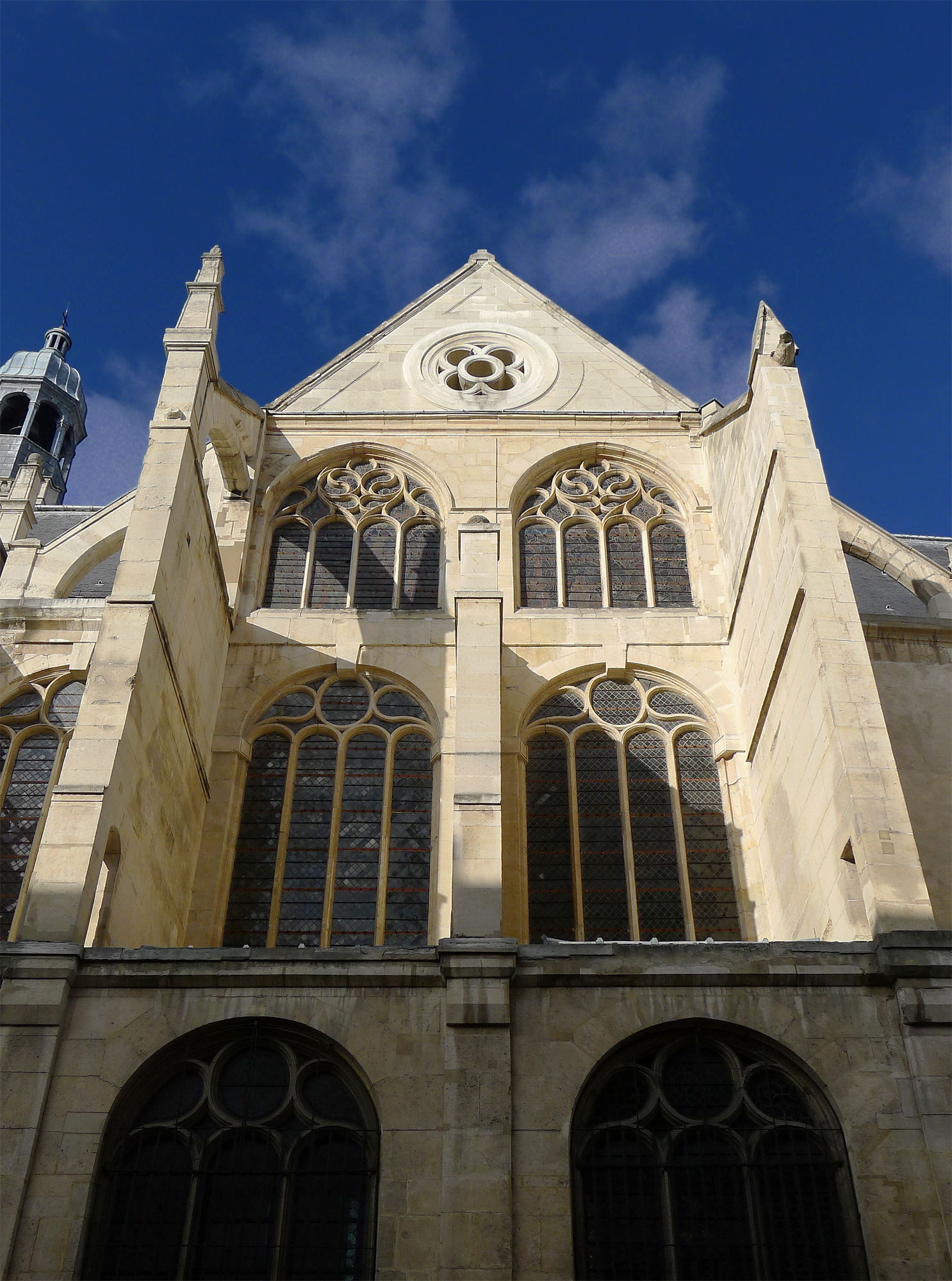
The south transept

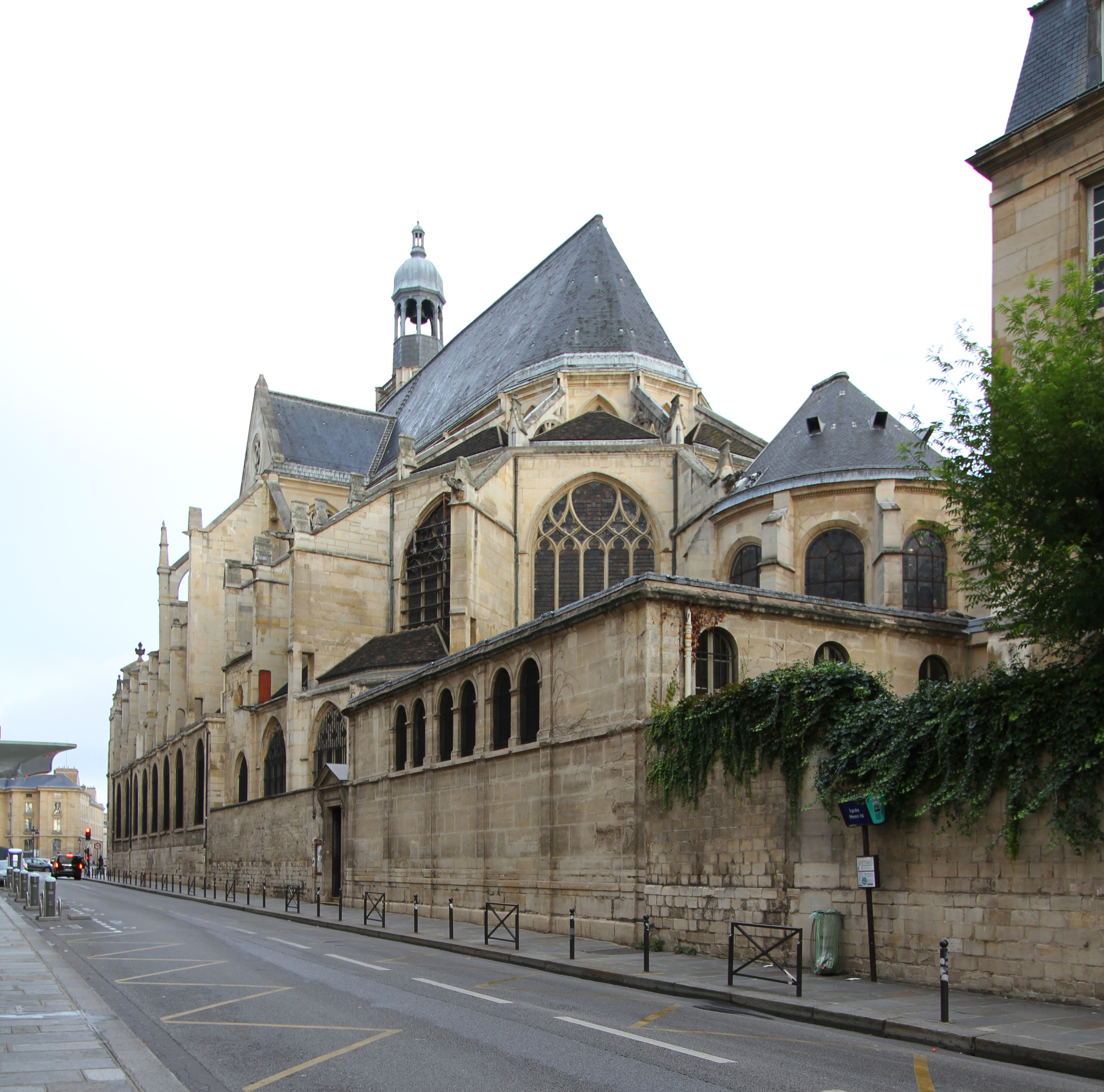
Apse at the east end

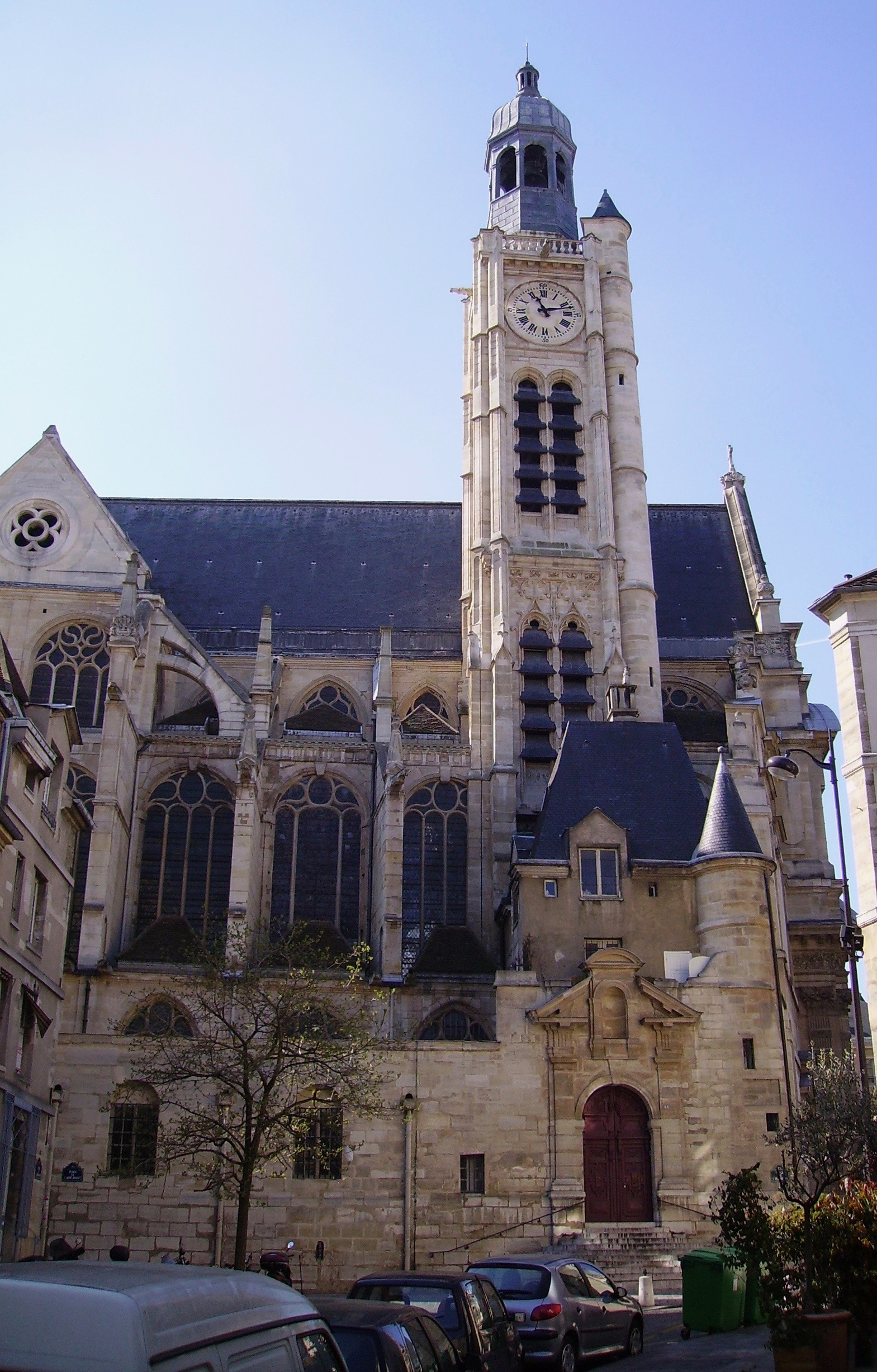
Bell tower on the north side

== Interior ==
Plan of the interior

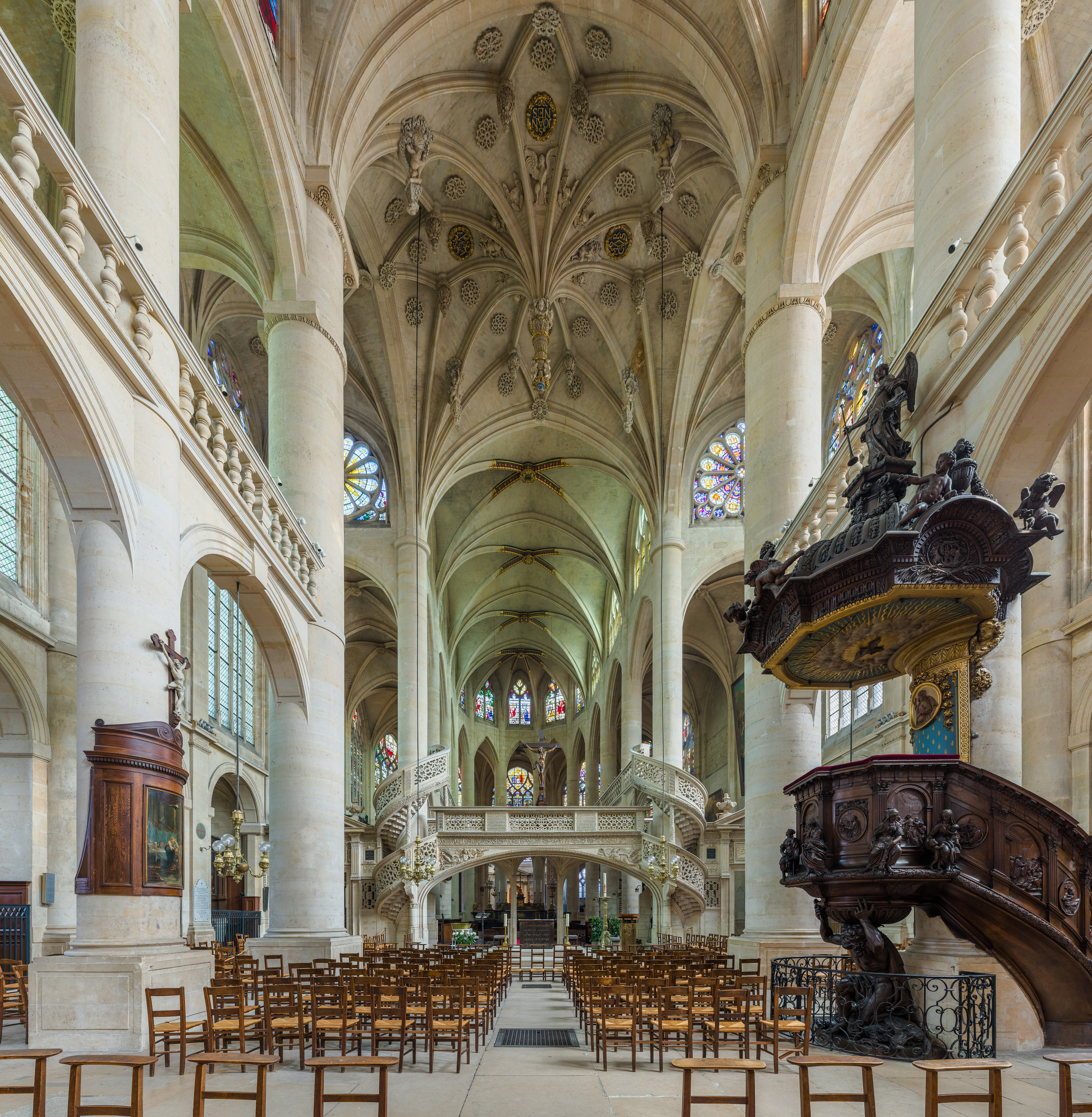
The nave, showing the rood screen, pulpit and ceiling details

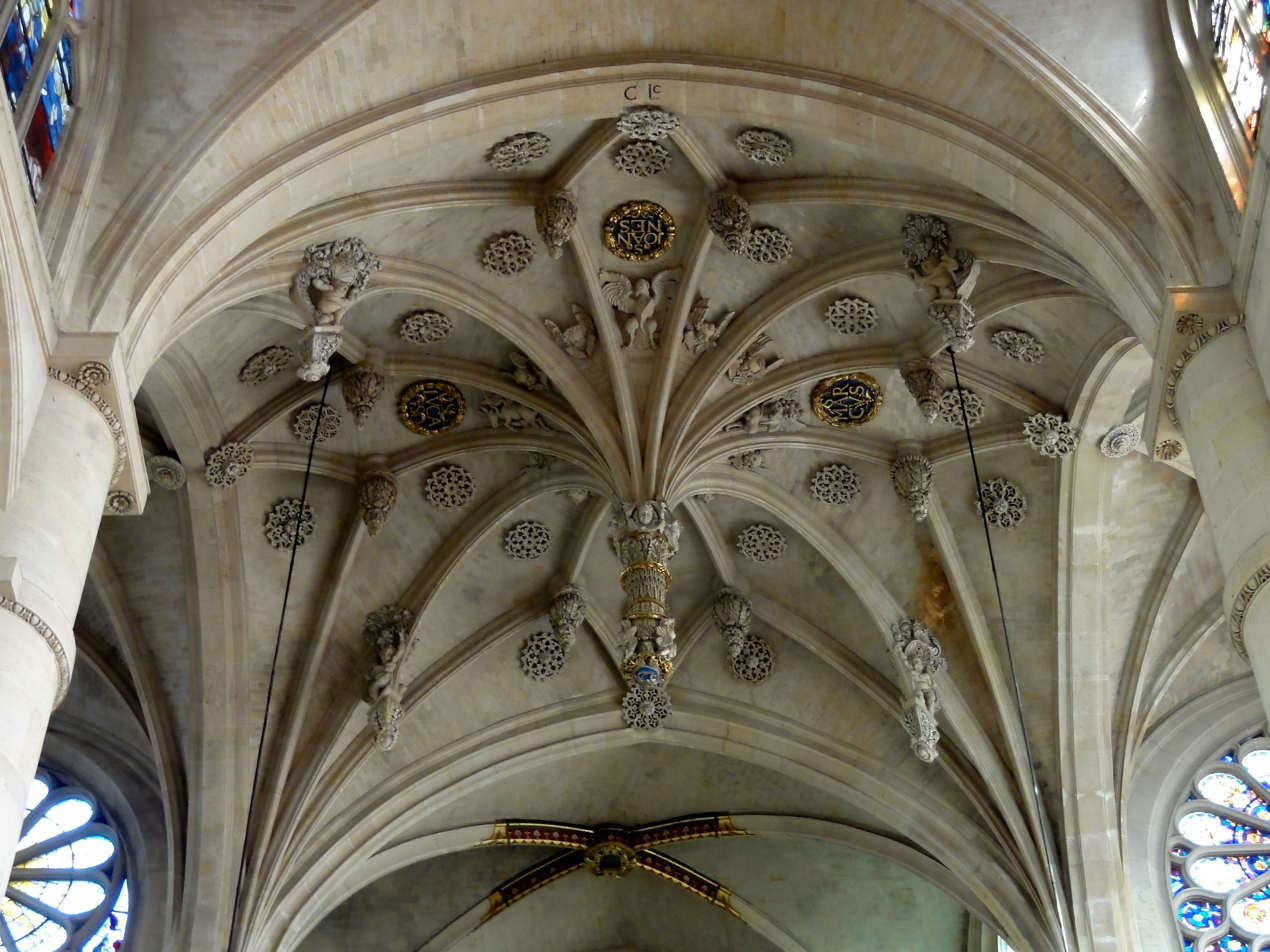
Flamboyant vault of the transept

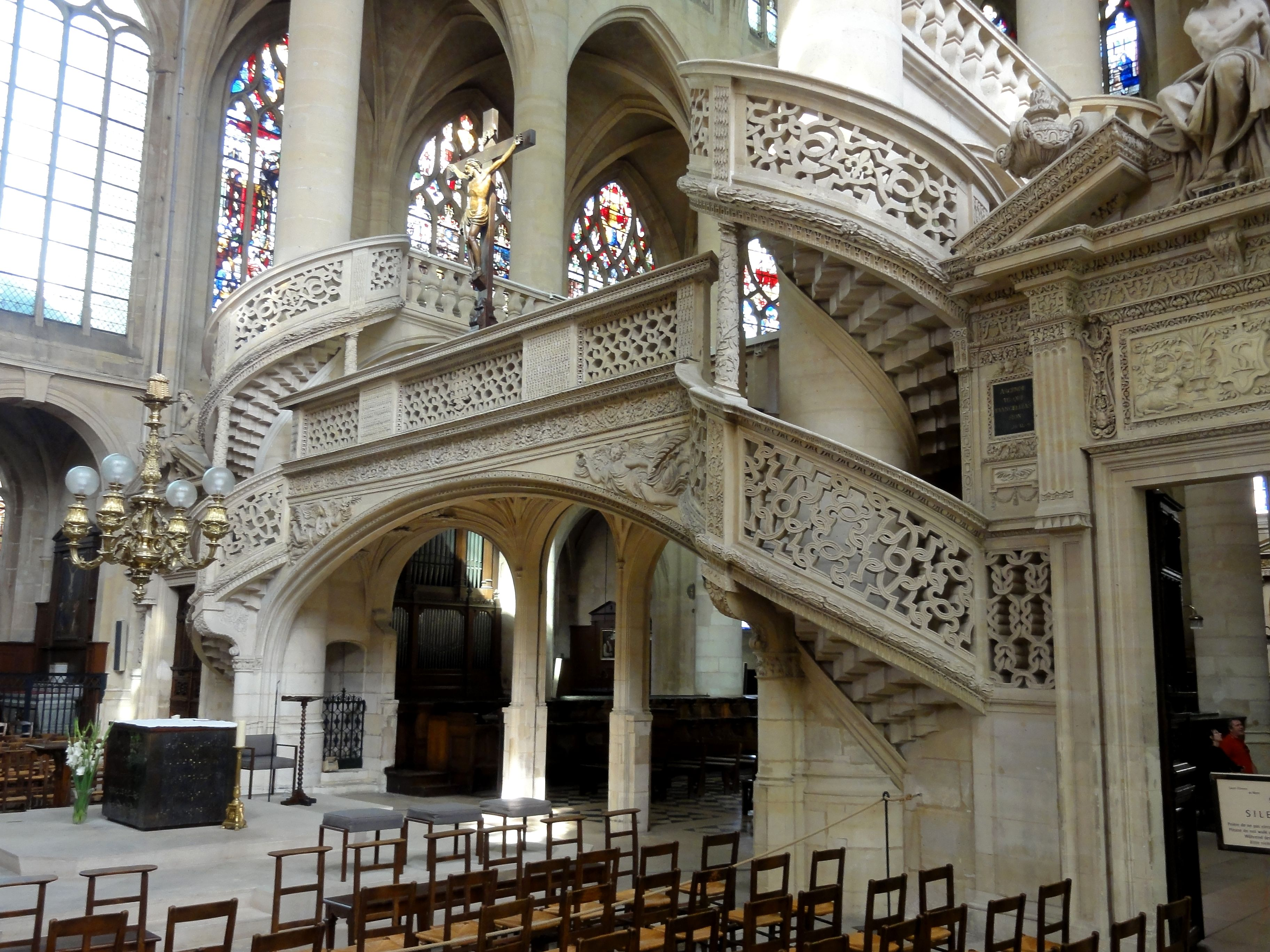
The jubé, or rood screen

The interior is a that of a hall church of large proportions, sixty-nine meters long and 25.5 meters wide. The collateral aisles on either side of the nave and choir are unusually high, and have large windows, filling the church with light. The interior of the church combines Flamboyant Gothic architecture, including elaborate rib vaults with hanging keystones, alongside elements of Italian Renaissance decoration, such as classical columns and arcades, and an abundance of sculpted heads of angels integrated into the architecture.

=== Nave and pulpit ===
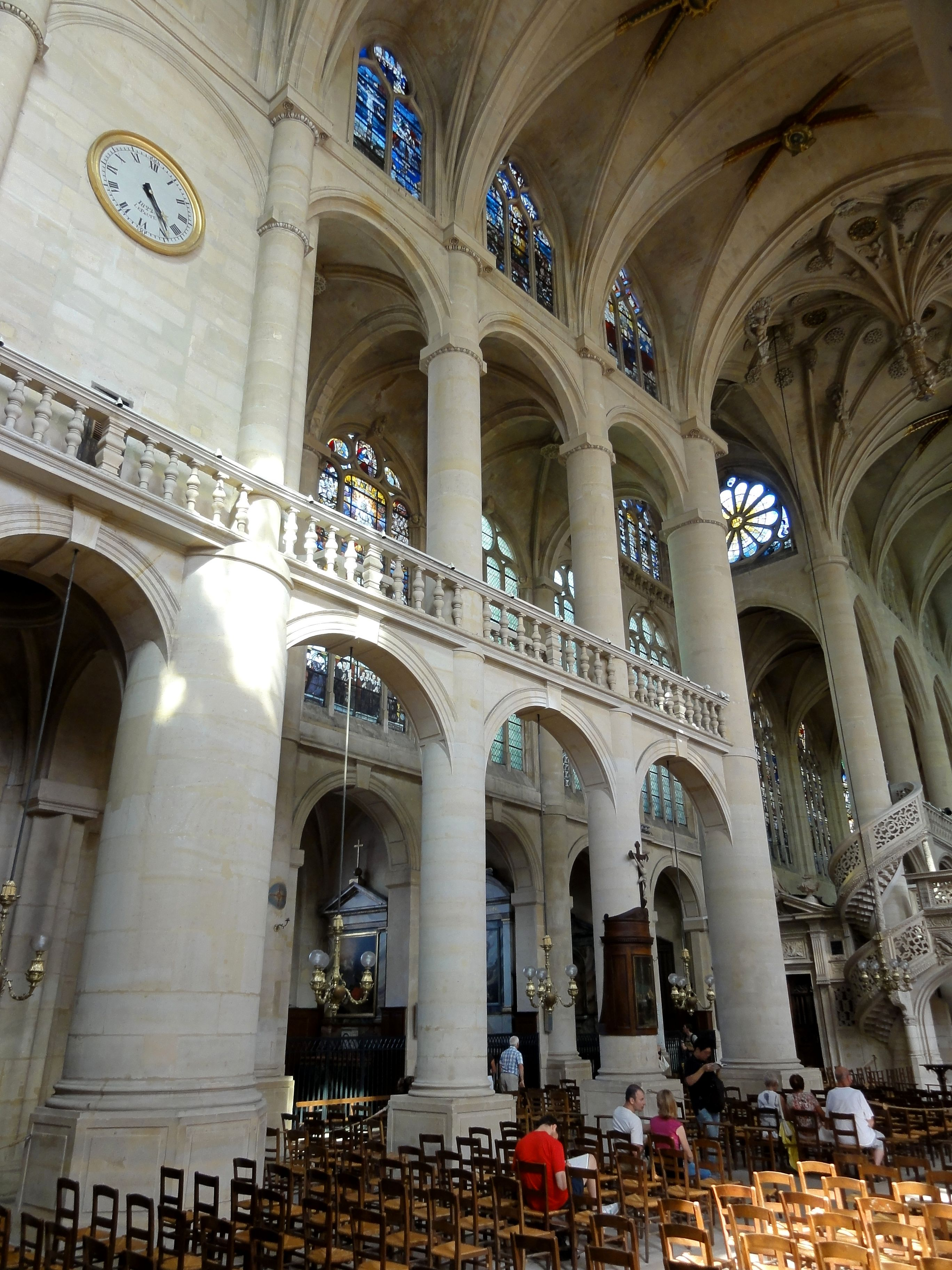
North elevation of the nave

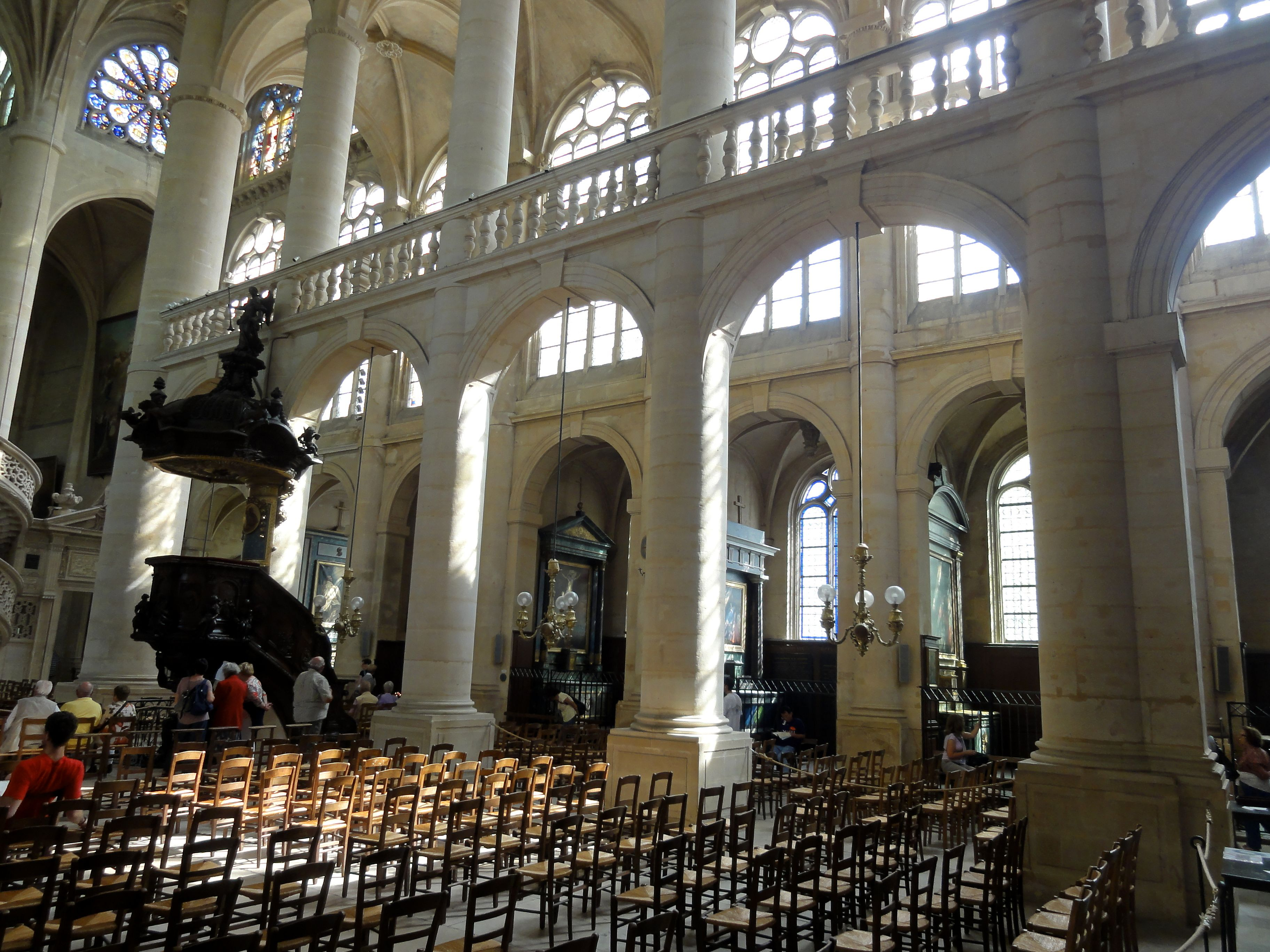
South elevation of nave, with grand arcades and pulpit

The nave has two levels of grand arcades with circular columns and rounded arches which separate the nave from the outer, or collateral aisles. These arcades have a passageway with balustrades. The balustrades are also used on special church holidays to display tapestries from the church collection. The upper walls of the collateral aisles have very large windows, which fill the interior with light.

One unusual feature of the interior is the slight curve of the axis from the nave to the transept, caused by the irregular site.

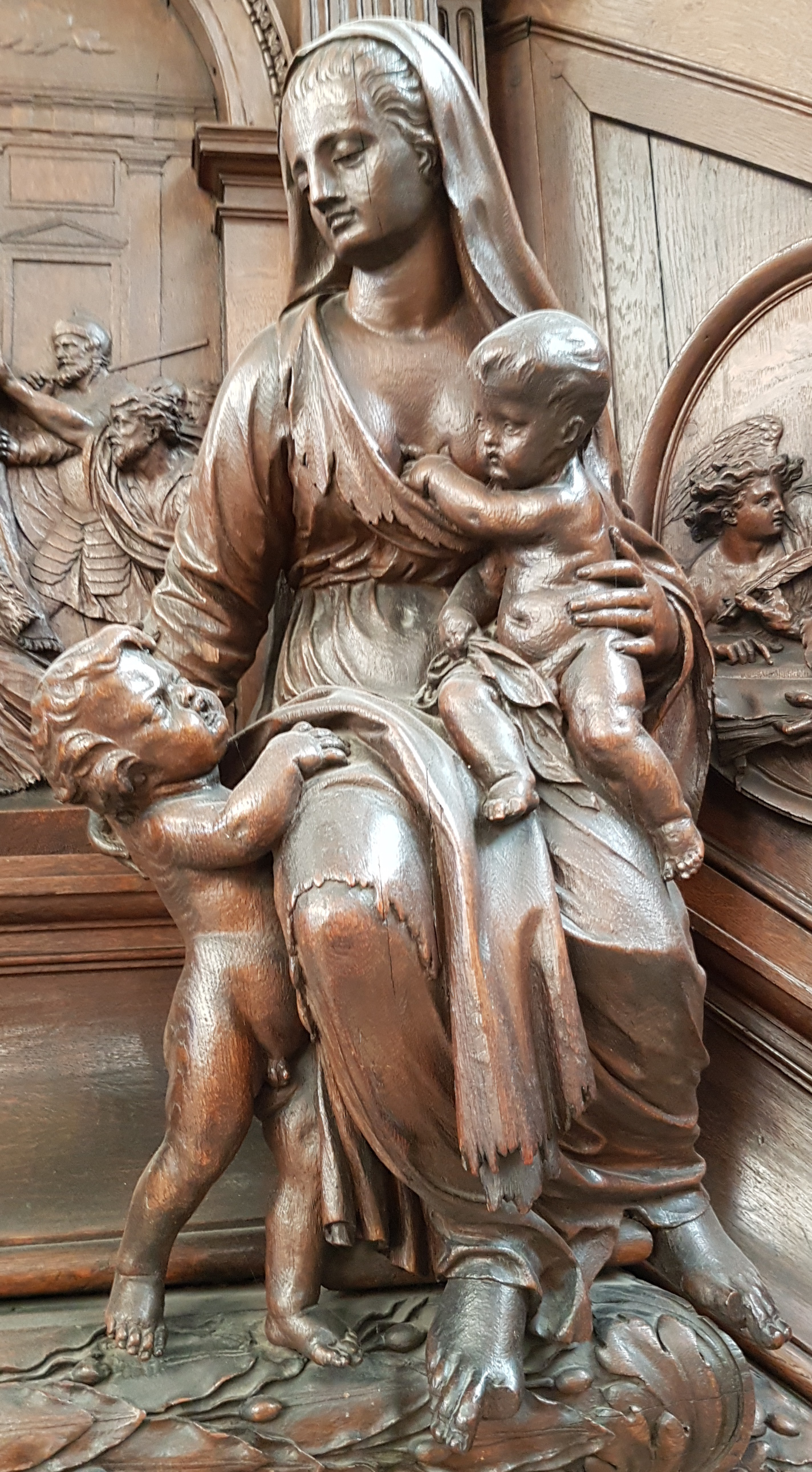
Statue of "Charity", from the pulpit (1651)

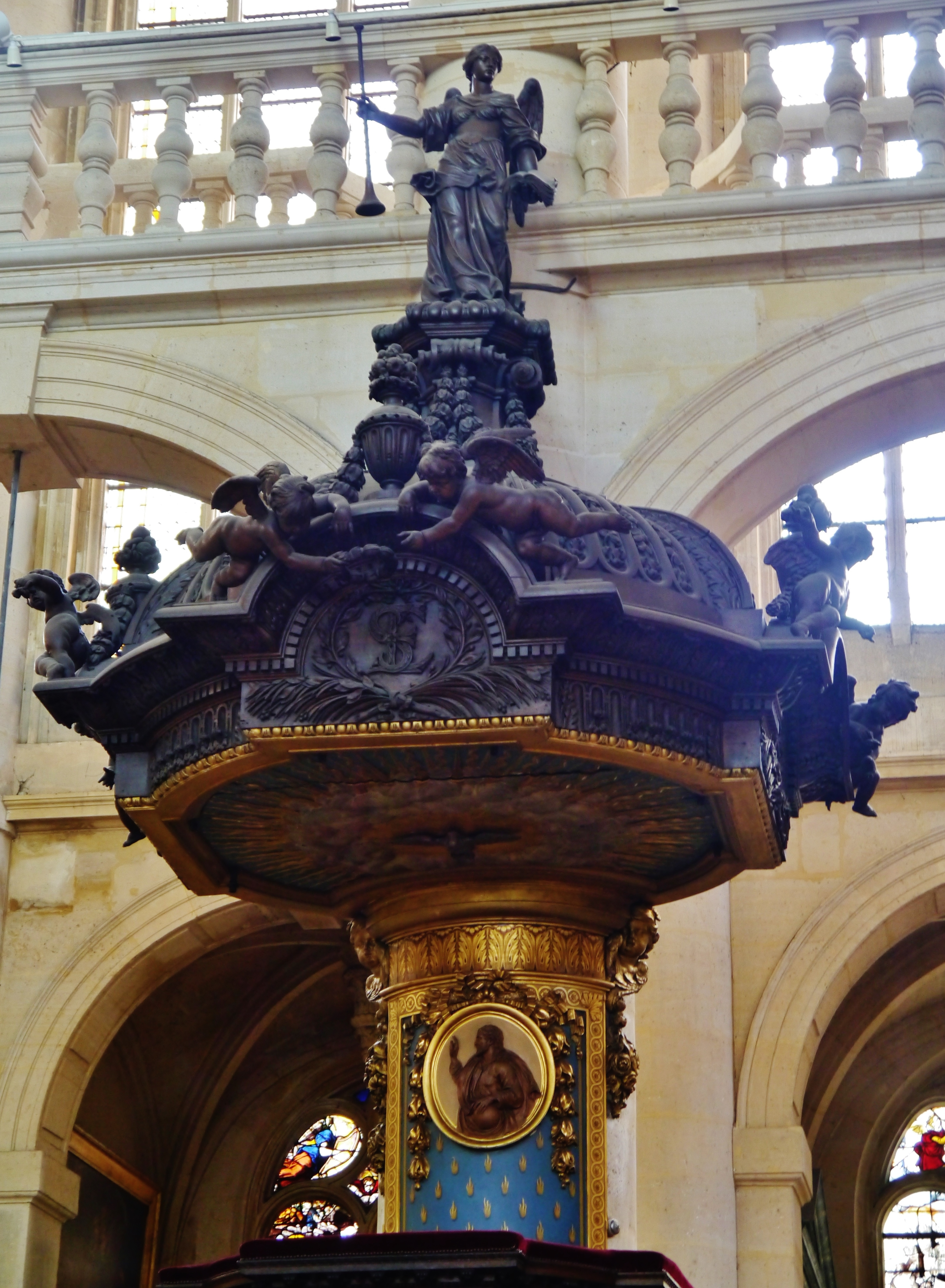
Detail of the pulpit

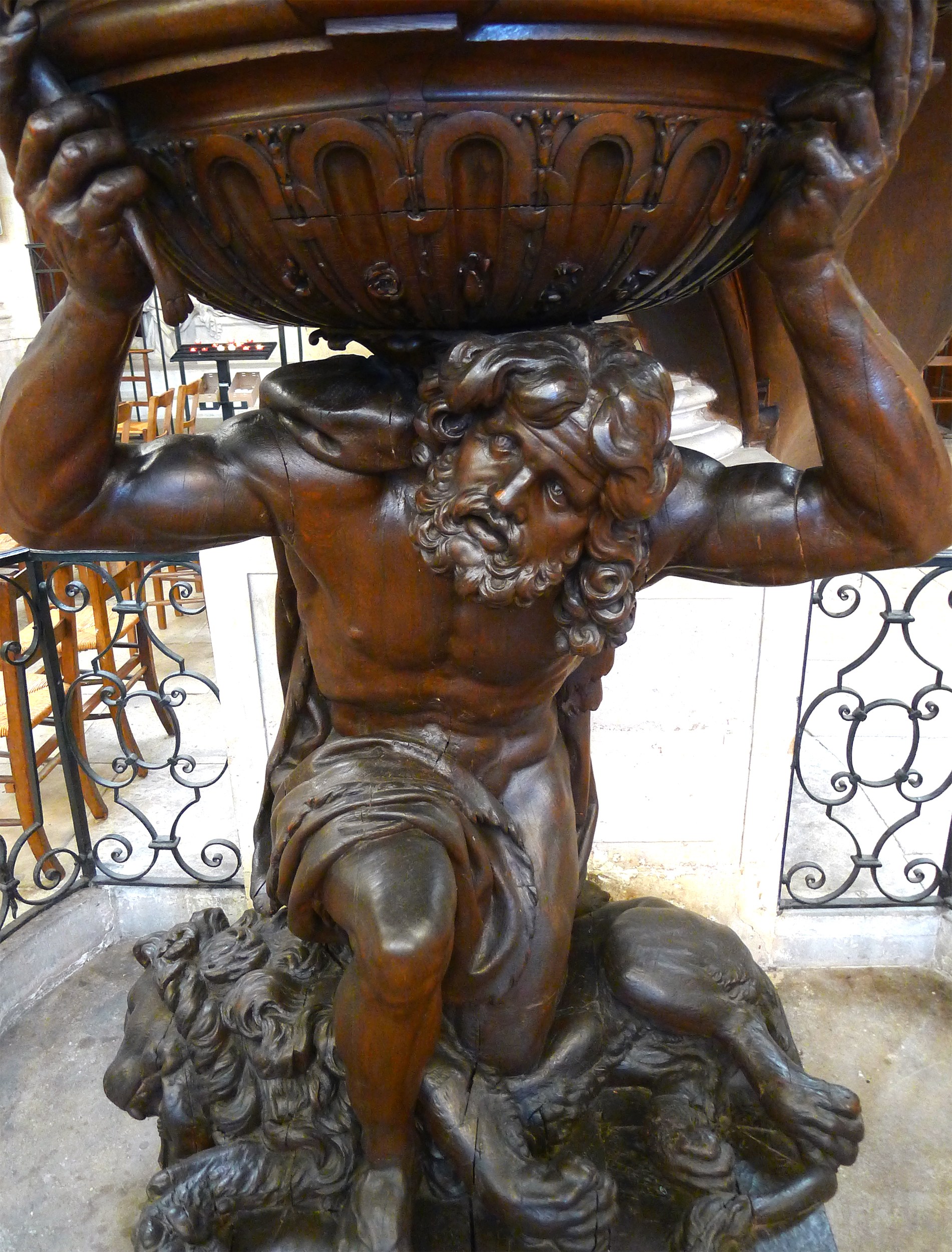
The base of the pulpit, supported by Samson kneeling on a lion

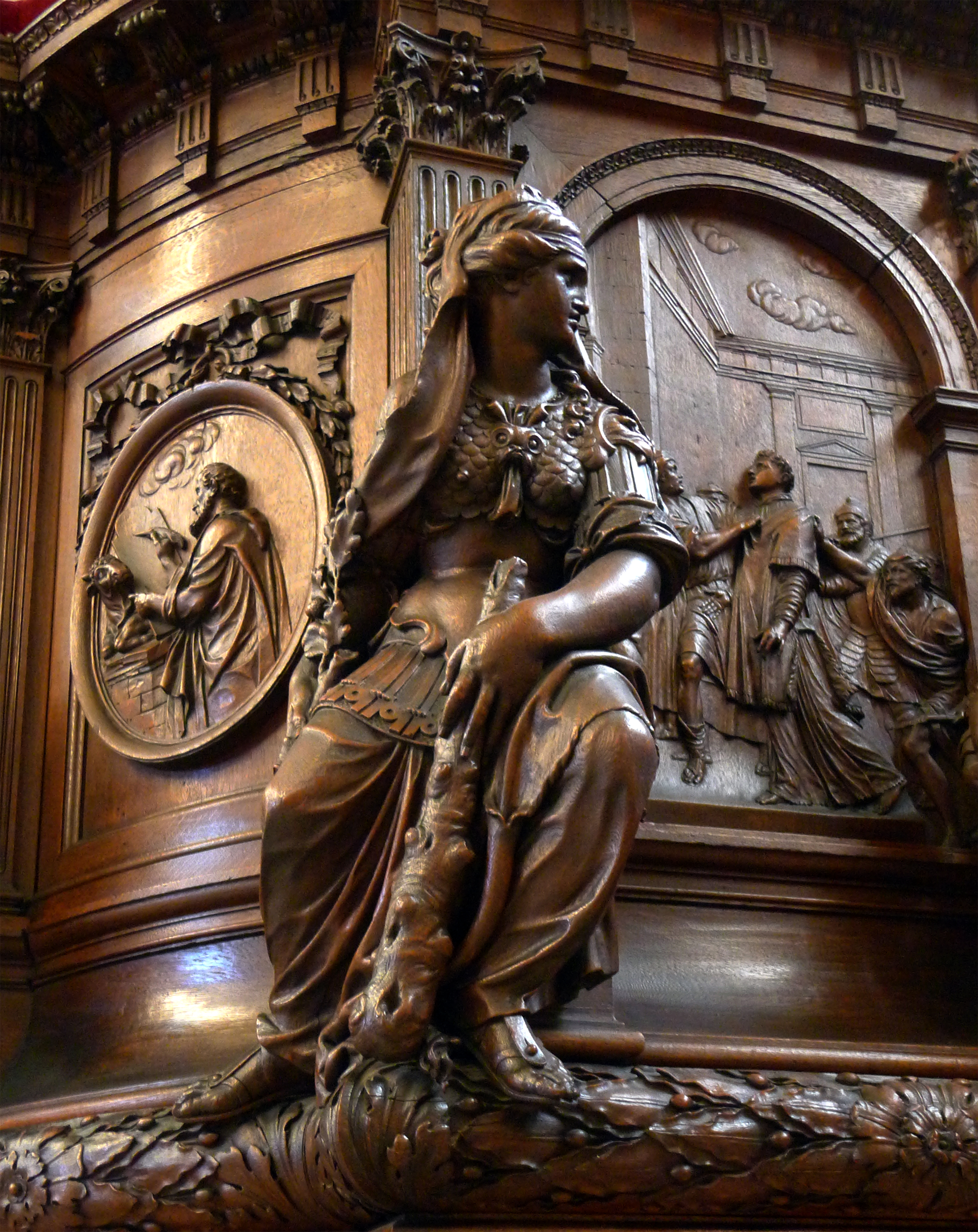
Detail of the pulpit

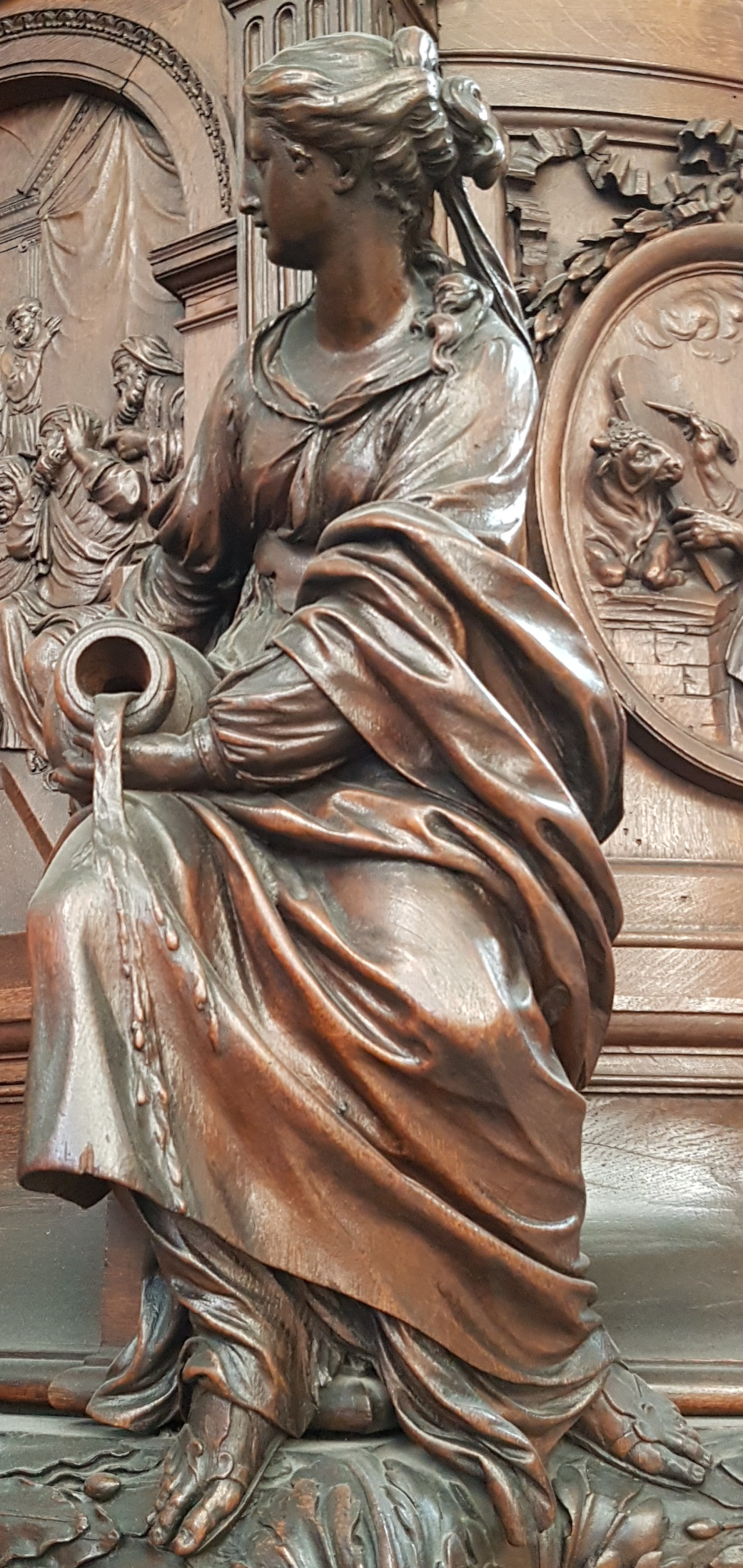
Detail of the pulpit – "Temperance"

The most prominent decorative work in the nave is the pulpit, created in 1651 by Germain Pillion. It is supported by a carved sculpture of Samson kneeling upon a lion, and holding the jawbone of an ass with which he fought the Philistines. Other statues of the virtues and other allegorical figures carved by Claude Lestocart surround the pulpit.

=== Jubé or rood screen ===
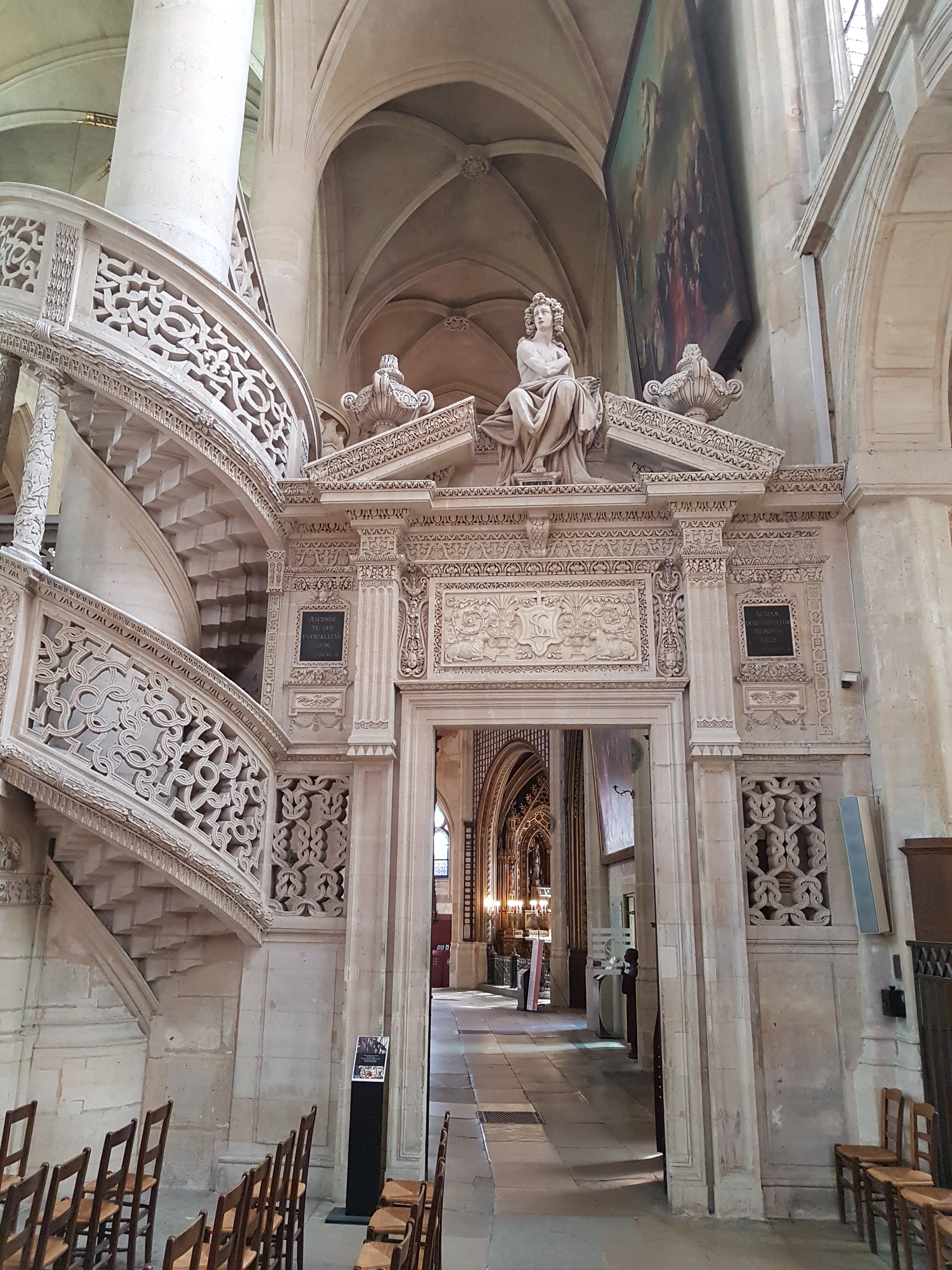
Portal of the rood screen

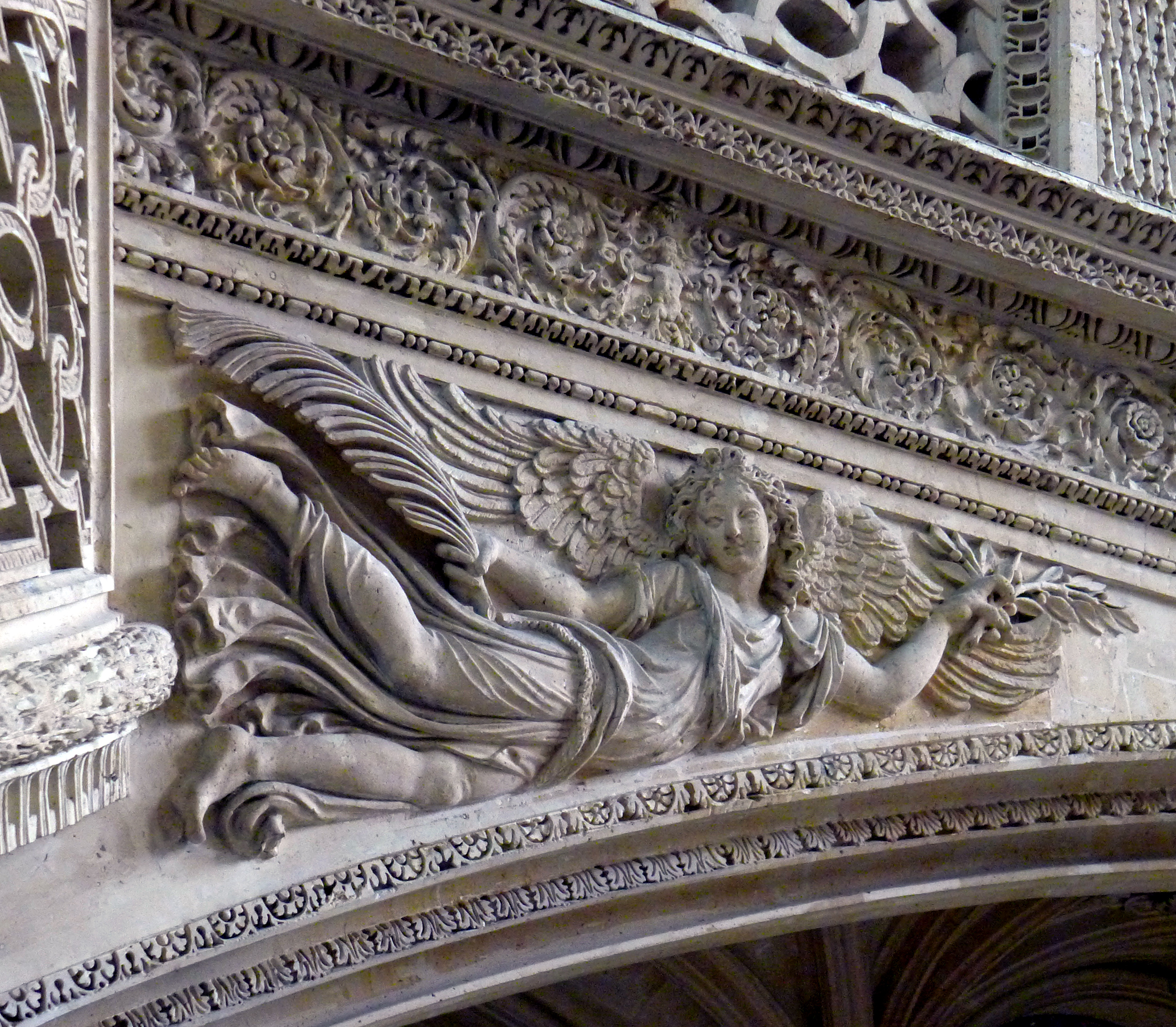
Detail of the rood screen sculpture

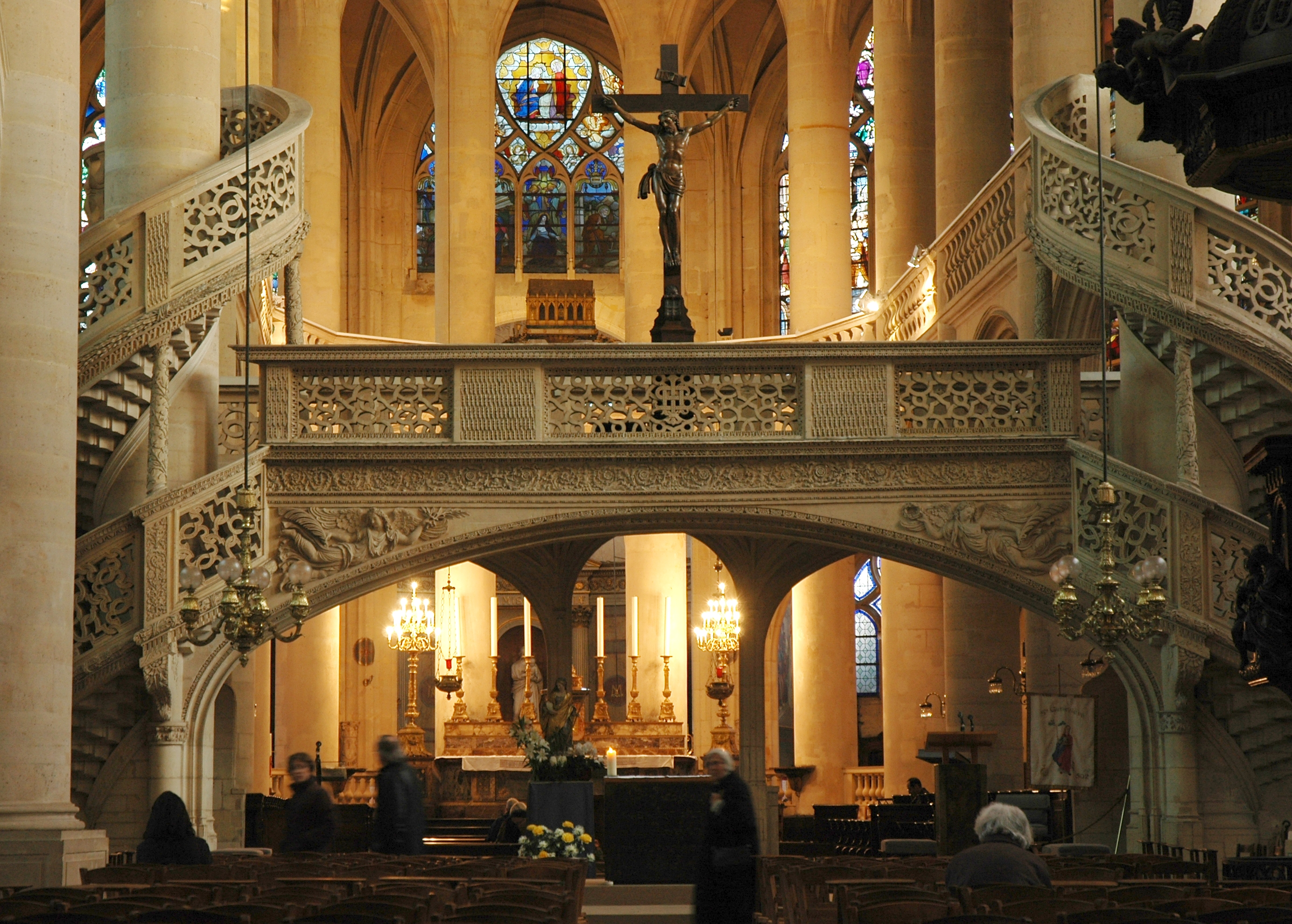
The jubé, or rood screen (about 1530)

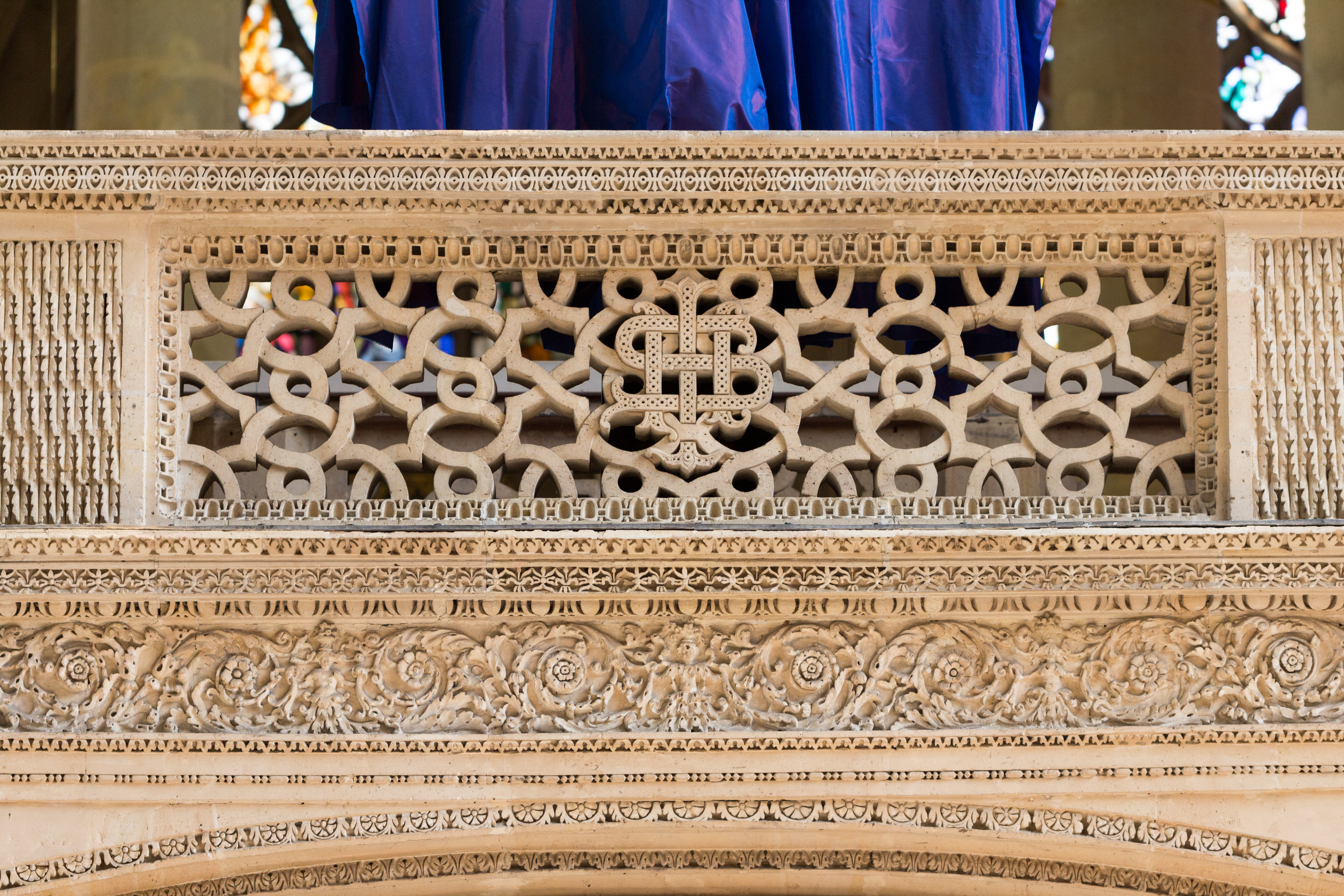
Filagree balcony of the rood screen

The most unusual feature of the church is the jubé or rood screen, created in about 1530, the only existing example in Paris. It is an elaborate sculptural screen which separates the nave from the choir. The screen was used as a platform to read the scripture to the ordinary parishioners. They were very common during the Middle Ages, but were largely abolished in the 17th and 18th centuries under a decree of the Council of Trent (1545–1563) which aimed at making the ceremonies in the choir more visible to the ordinary parishioners in the nave.

The screen was designed by Antoine Beaucorps, and while its purpose is Gothic, its decoration is French Renaissance. It takes the form of an arched bridge facing the choir with three arcades. A tribune for readings occupies the center facing the nave. Two very elegant spiral stairways give access to the tribune from the sides. The decoration includes two statues of "Renommées", or "Renowned ones," based on classical Roman statues, holding olive branches and crowns.

The church is characterized by its curved axis of the nave to the transept, the rood screen (the sole surviving example in Paris) of finely carved stone by Father Biard (1545), his chair designed by Laurent de La Hyre and sculpted by Claude Lestocart and its organ case (1631) (the oldest in the capital). The church also contains the shrine containing the relics of St. Genevieve until 1793 (when they were thrown in the sewer), the tomb of Blaise de Vigenere, of Blaise Pascal, of Racine, and Mg Sibour.

=== The choir and side chapels ===
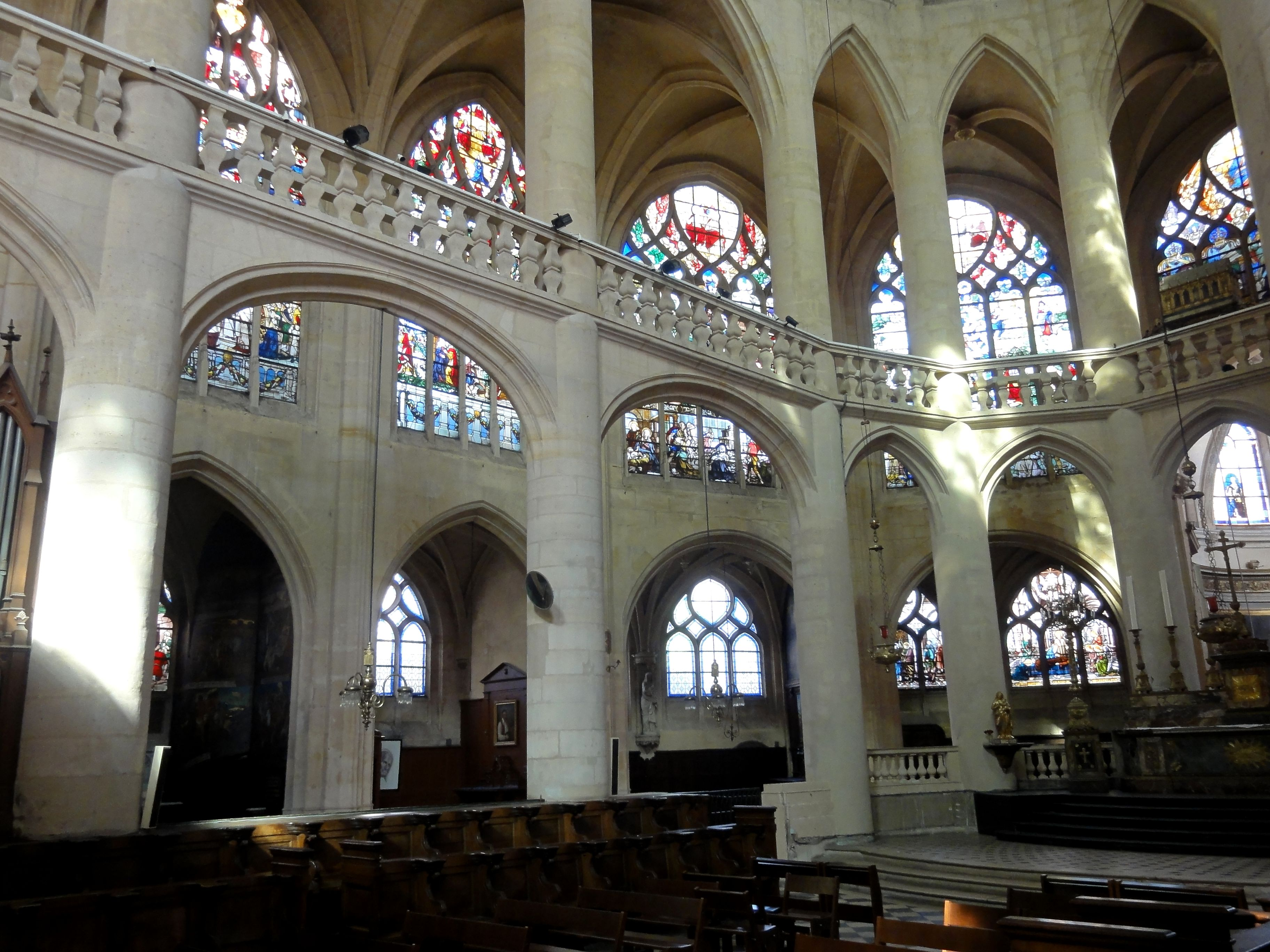
The choir on the north side

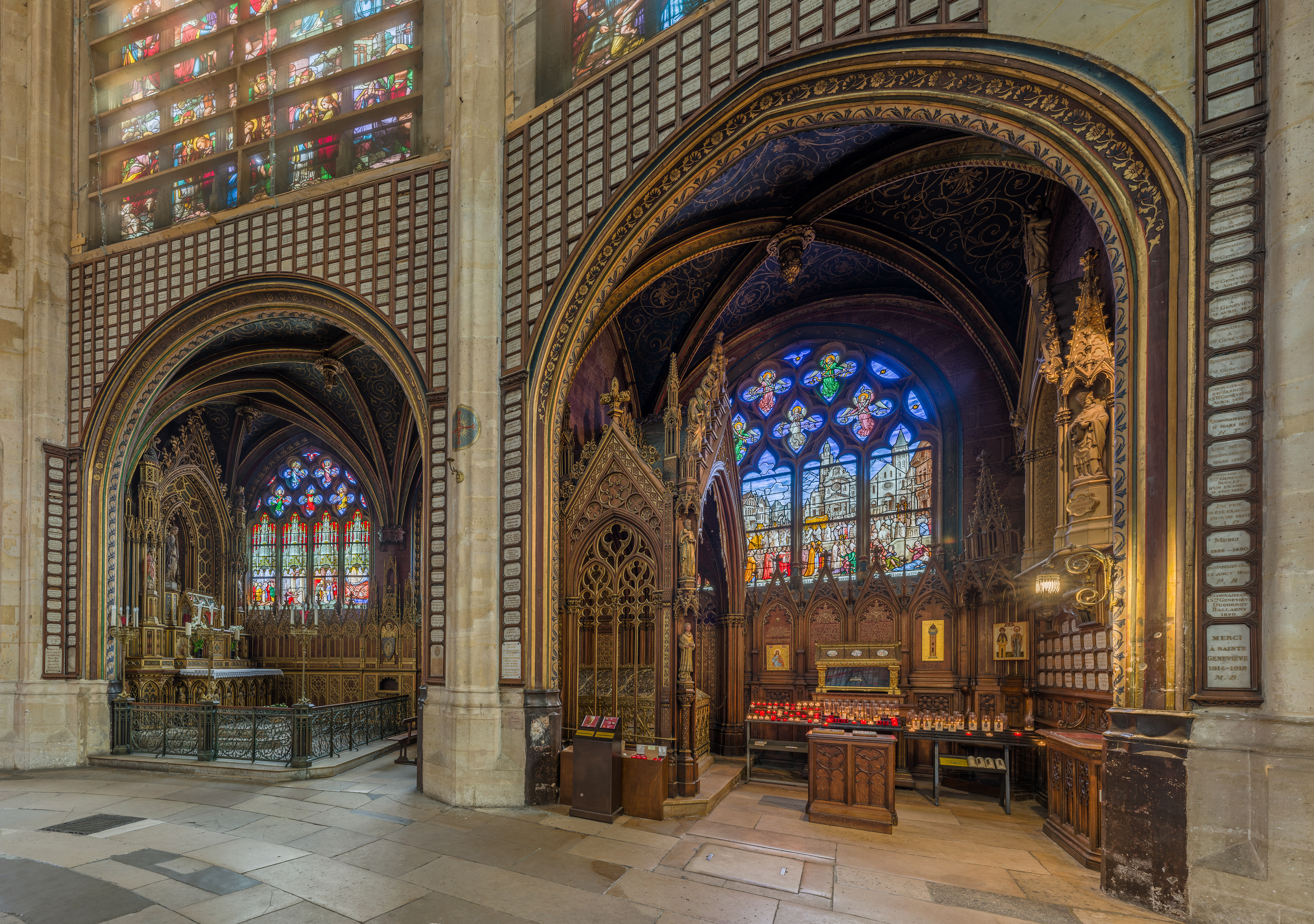
Side chapels

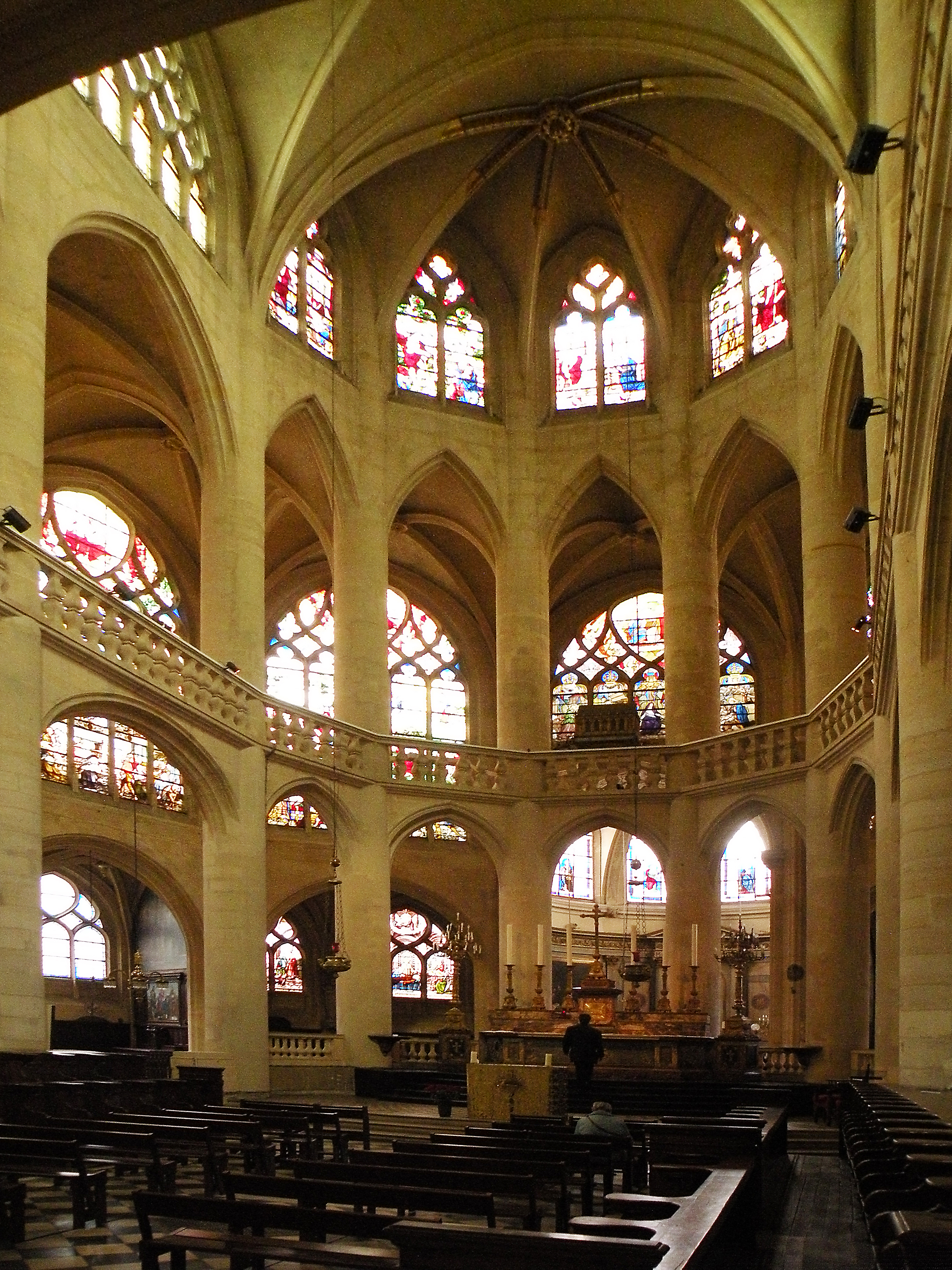
The apse, at the east end of the church

=== Chapel of Saint-Genevieve ===
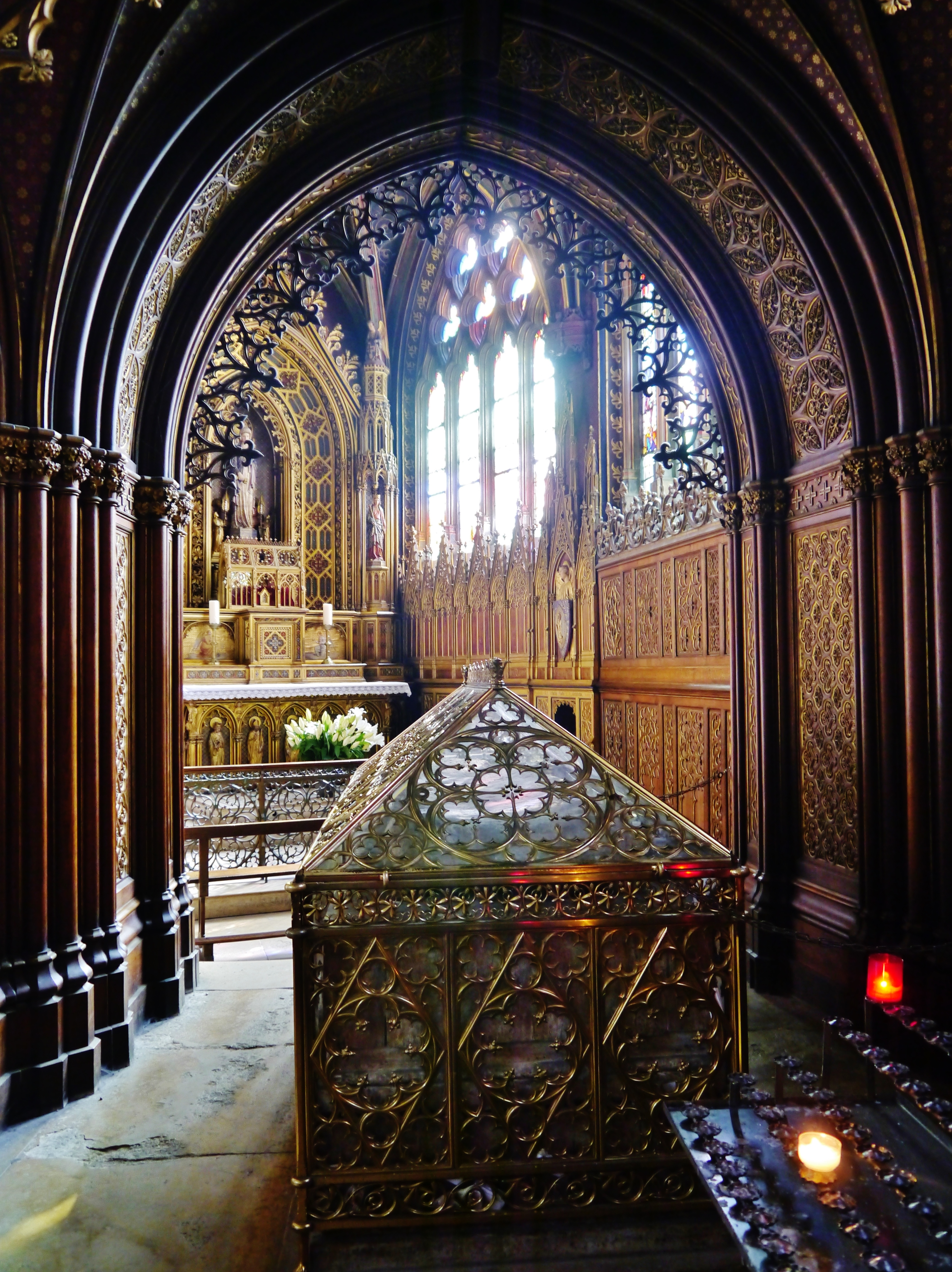
Chapel of Saint-Genevieve

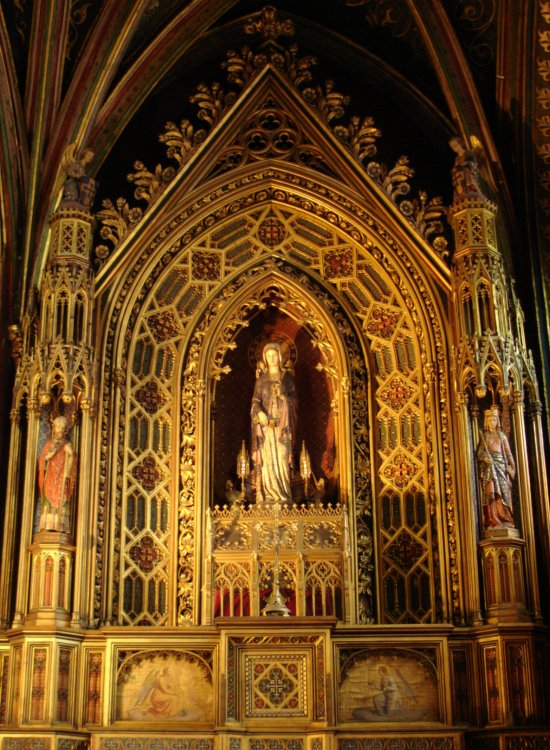
Shrine in the Chapel of Saint Genevieve

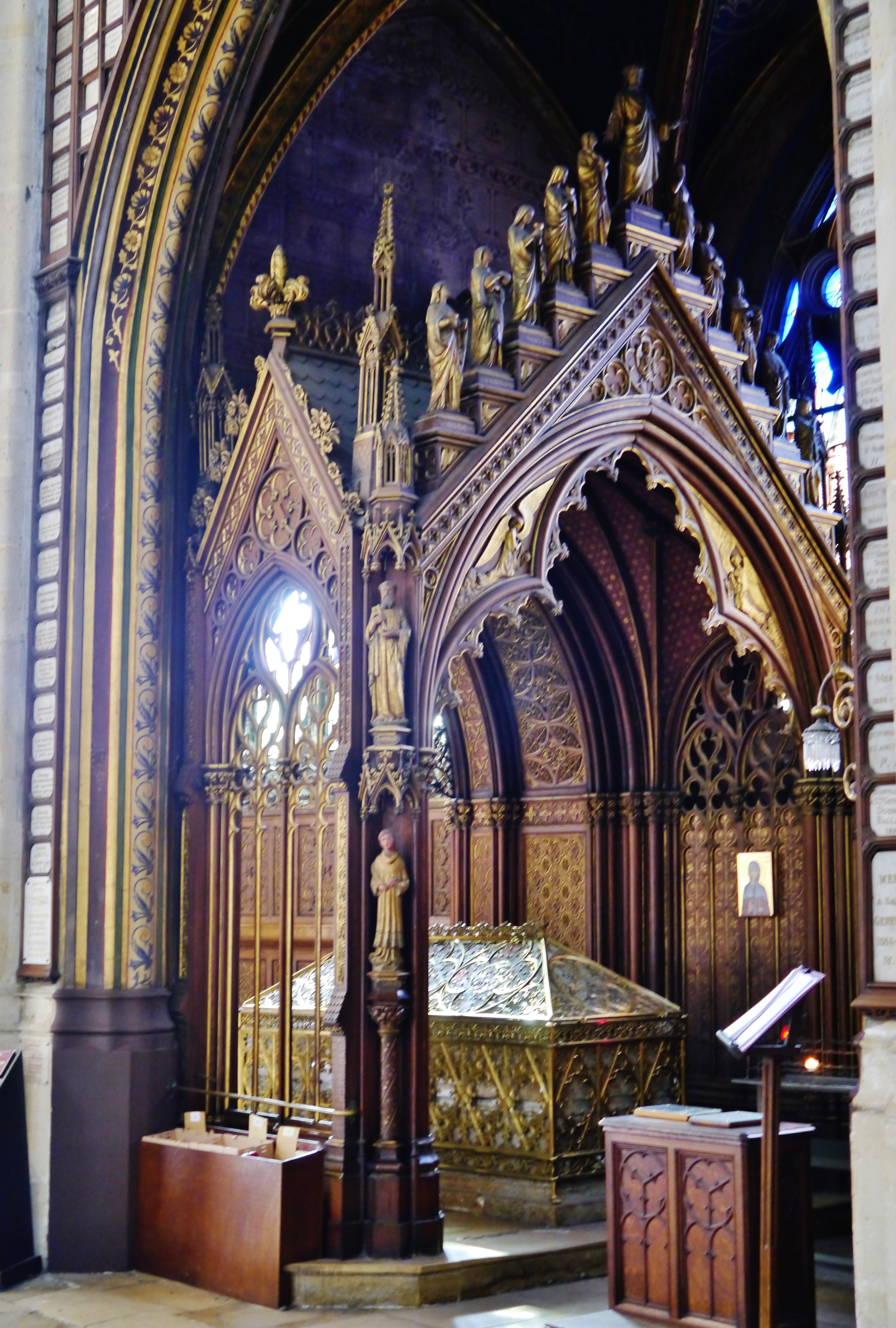
Ciborium over the reliquary of Saint Genevieve

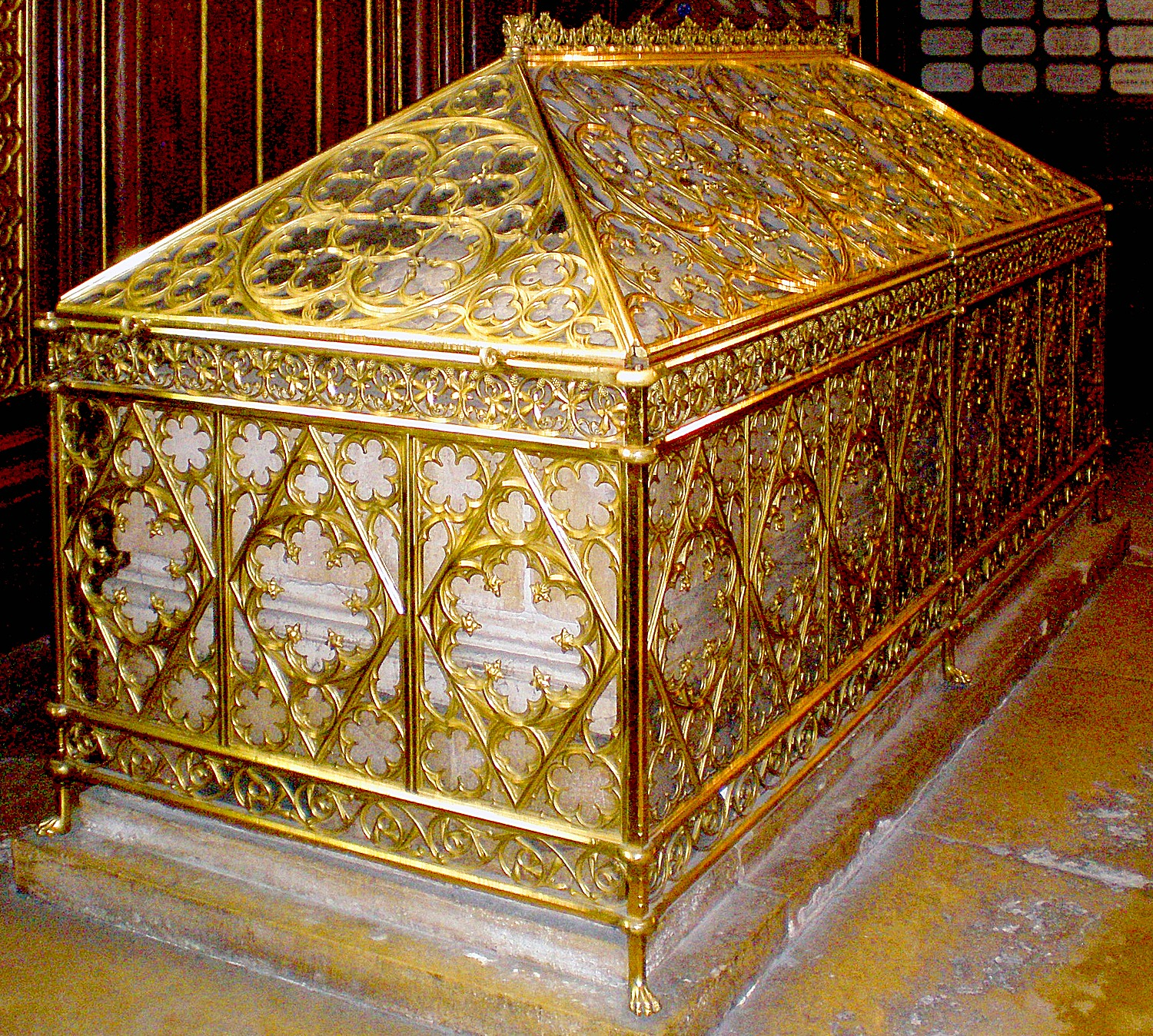
Chasse or reliquary for the surviving relics of Saint Genevieve (19th c.)

The Chapel of Saint Genevieve is a Flamboyant Gothic shrine to the patron saint of Paris. Her original tomb and relics were destroyed during the French Revolution. The chasse or reliquary seen now was made in the 19th century of chiseled and gilded copper. It contains a fragment of her original tomb. Overlooking the tomb is a ciborium, an ornamental work featuring statues of the wise and foolish virgins, representing those faithful versus those who reject the church.

=== Chapel of the Virgin ===
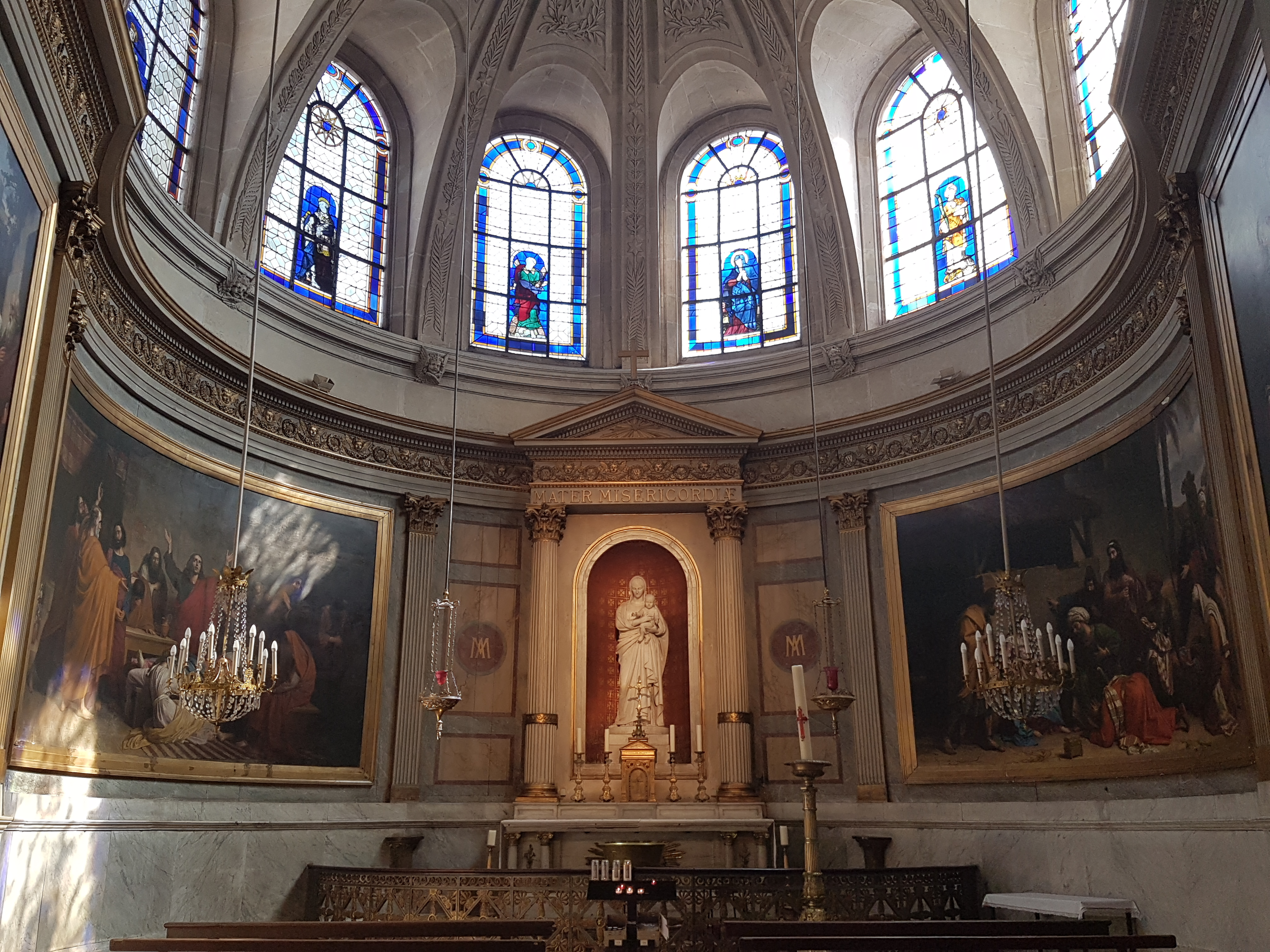
Chapel of the Virgin at east end of church

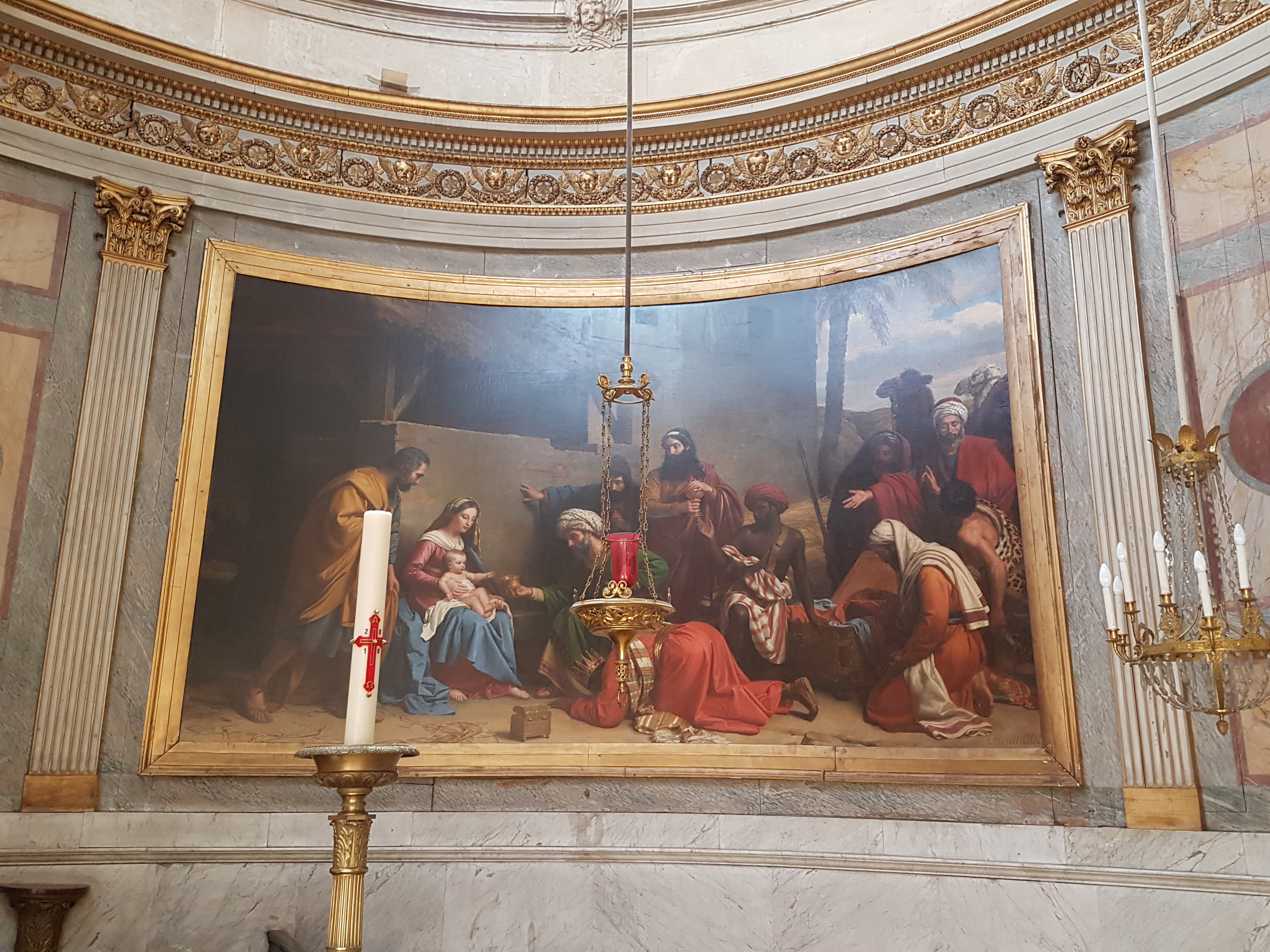
Adoration of the Christ Child by the Three Kings (Chapel of the Virgin, 1605–1609)

Behind the altar in the apse at the east end of the church is the semi-circular Chapel of the Virgin. A small cloister was built at the east end of the church between 1605 and 1609. It originally enclosed a small cemetery, but no longer has any tombs. The interior originally contained three galleries with twenty-four stained glass windows, made with great realism with the use of enamel paints baked onto the glass. The windows illustrated scenes from the Old Testament and New Testament, as well as scenes of Paris life. Twelve of the original windows survived the Revolution and can be seen today, including the "Adoration of the Holy Sacrament" and the "Mystic Wine-Press".

== Cloister Gallery, Chapel of Communion Stained Glass Collection ==
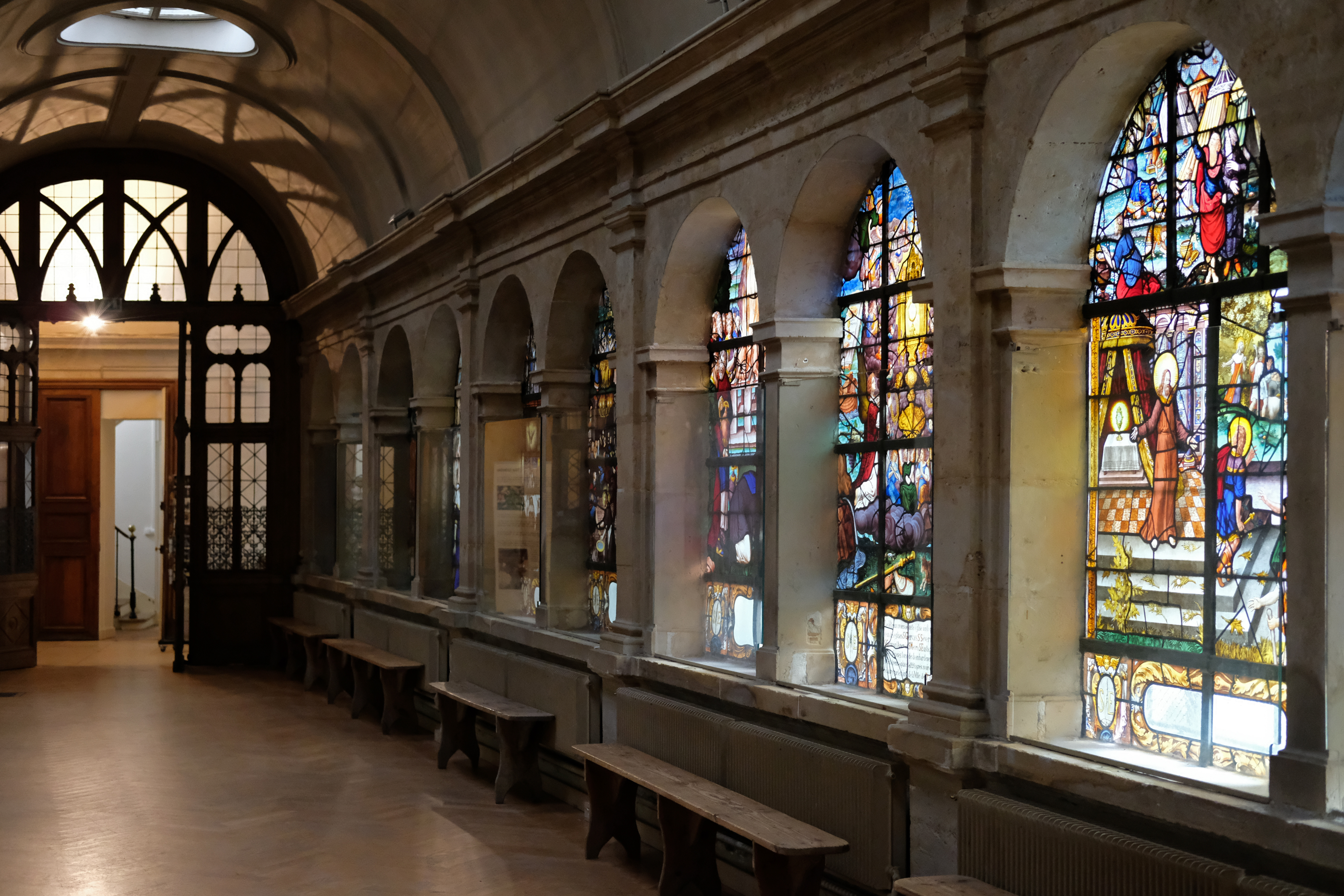
The Chapel of Communion

The Chapel of Communion (also known as the Cloister Gallery or Chamber of Catechisms) adjoining the choir originally contained the remains of clerics of the church, and was known for that reason as the "Chapel of the Charnel House". Late in the French Revolution, the bodies of Jean-Paul Marat, after he was killed by Charlotte Corday, and Honoré Gabriel Riqueti, comte de Mirabeau (1795) were removed from the Panthéon, where they had been placed as revolutionary heroes, and kept in the chapel until they were later buried in ordinary graves.

During the First World War, when Paris was being bombarded by German artillery outside the city, a group of twelve 17th-century stained glass windows, belonging to the Churches of Saint-Eustache, Paris; Saint-Germain l'Auxerrois and Saint-Merri were transferred to the chapel for their protection. Following the war, the windows remained there, and underwent restoration, funded by the City of Paris. Unlike most other Paris stained glass windows of that period, they are at eye level and can be examined up close.

=== Windows 1 & 2: "Miracle of the Billettes" and "The Church as a Ship" ===
The first window tells an old anti-Semitic tale. In the upper window, Christ holds the sacred host. Below, a woman gives the host to a Jew named Tomthon. Tomthon throws the host into boiling water and stabs it with a dagger, but the host is indestructible. The woman rescues the host and takes it the Church of the Billettes.

The second window is called "The Church as a Ship". In the upper window is Noah's ark, with animals. In the center, a ship is floating atop a wooden cross, which protects it from storms, illustrated by surrounding evil faces. Christ steers the ship, while the passengers include an emperor, a king, a magistrate, Saint Francis, Saint Dominic, and the donors of the window. At the top Christ is shown blessing five loaves given to him by a child.

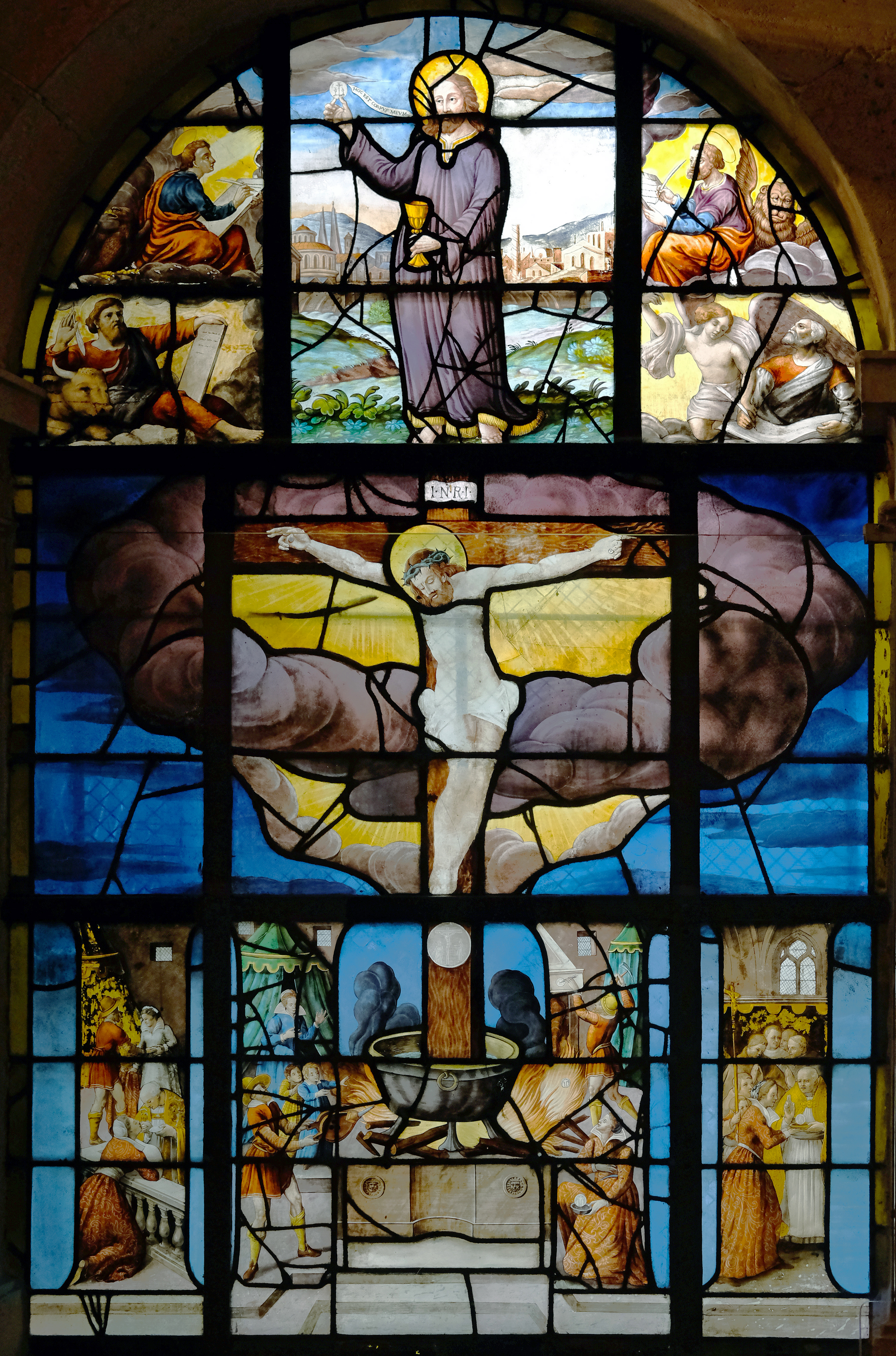
"Miracle of the Billettes"

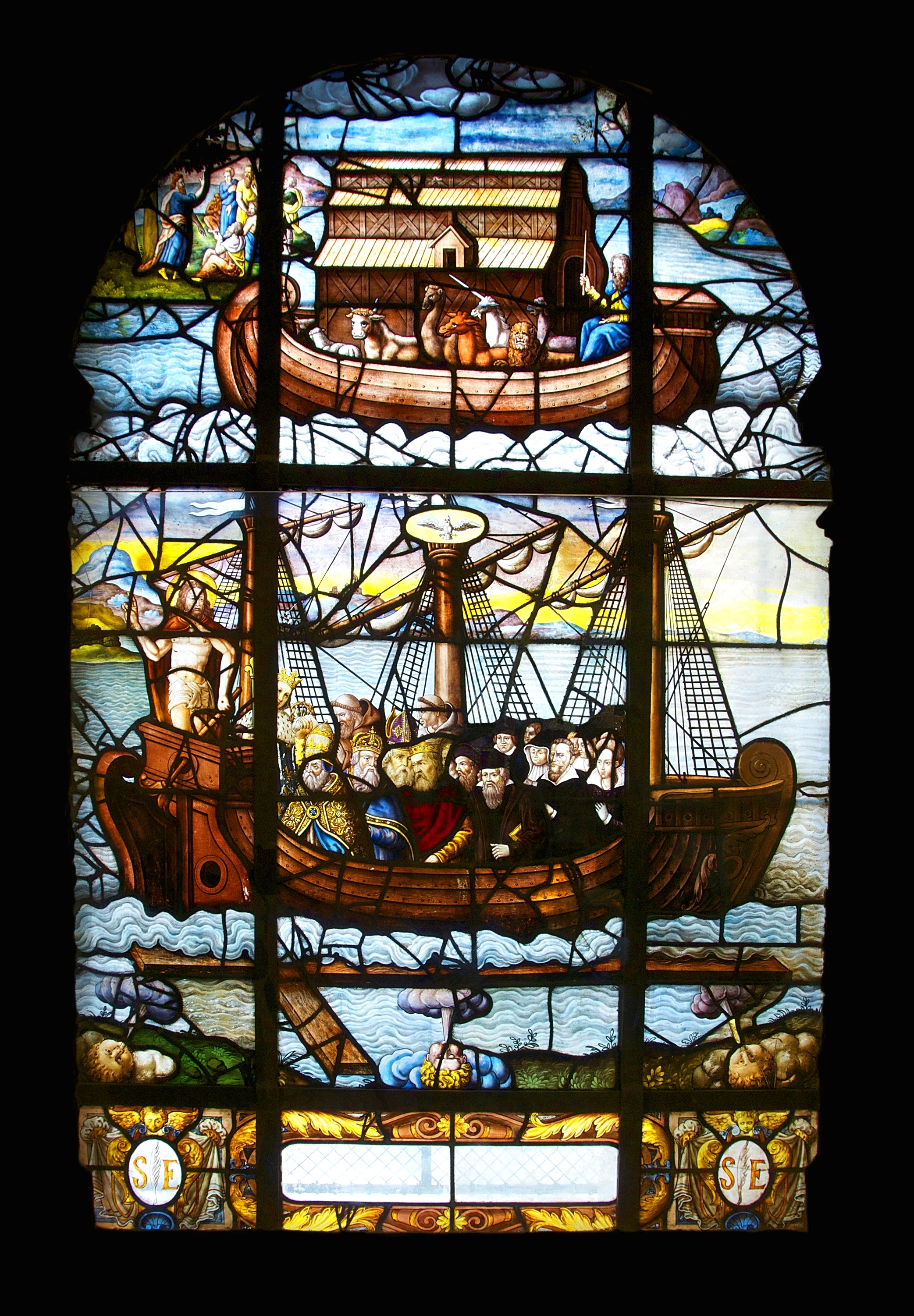
Window 2 – "The Church as a Ship"

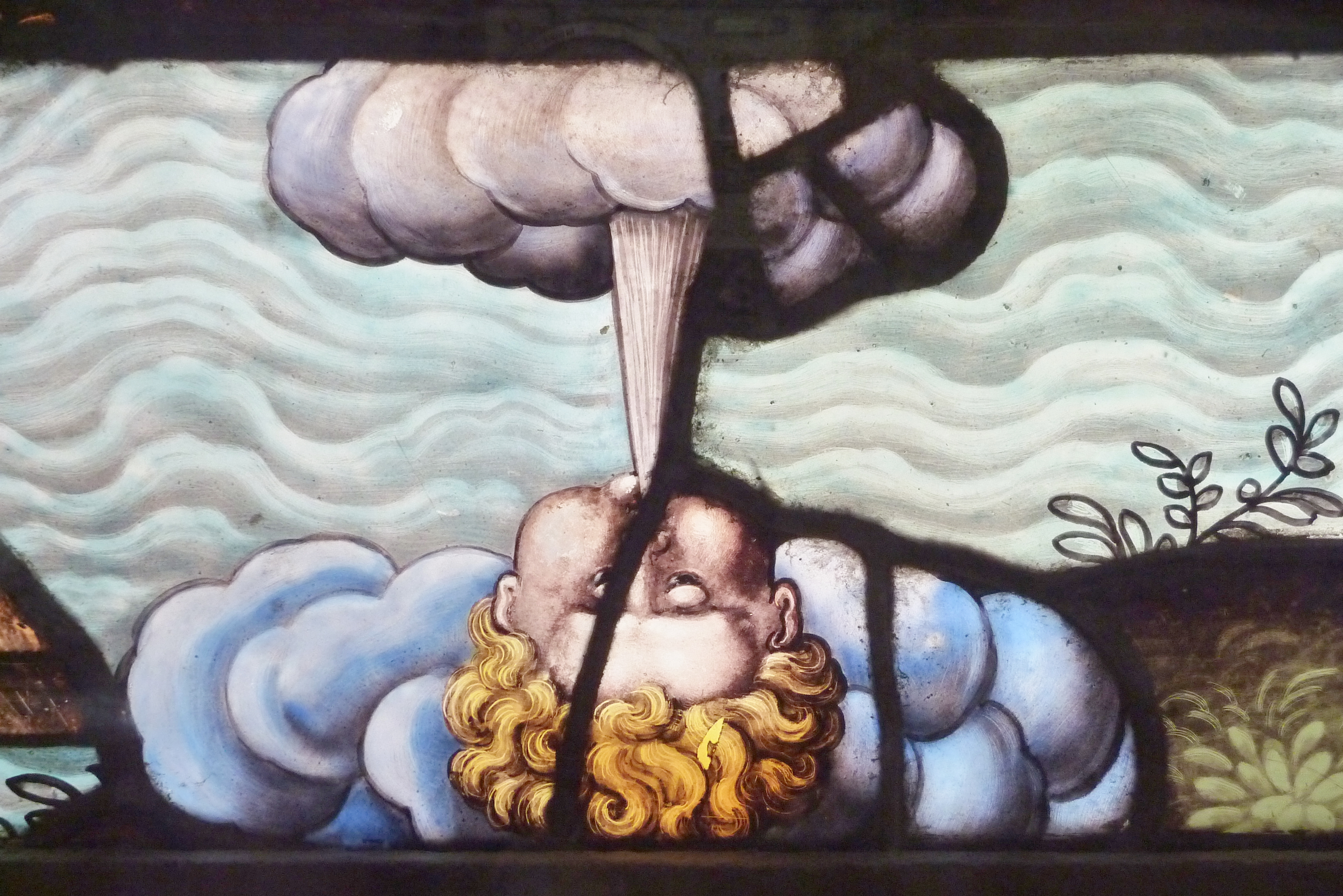
Detail of the blowing storm in "The Church as a Ship"

=== Windows 3 & 4: "Muliplication of Loaves" and "The Brass Serpent" ===
Window Three depicts Christ blessing five loaves of bread given him by a child (top), and Christ breaking bread with the disciples (below).

Window Four, "The Brass Serpent", dates from the 16th century, and, unlike the other windows, is made entirely of simple pieces of coloured glass, rather than glass with the figures painted with enamel pigments and then baked onto the glass. It depicts a story told in the Book of Numbers 21-19, telling how Moses made a serpent of brass, and put it upon a pole. Any man who was bitten by a serpent could look upon the brass serpent, and live.

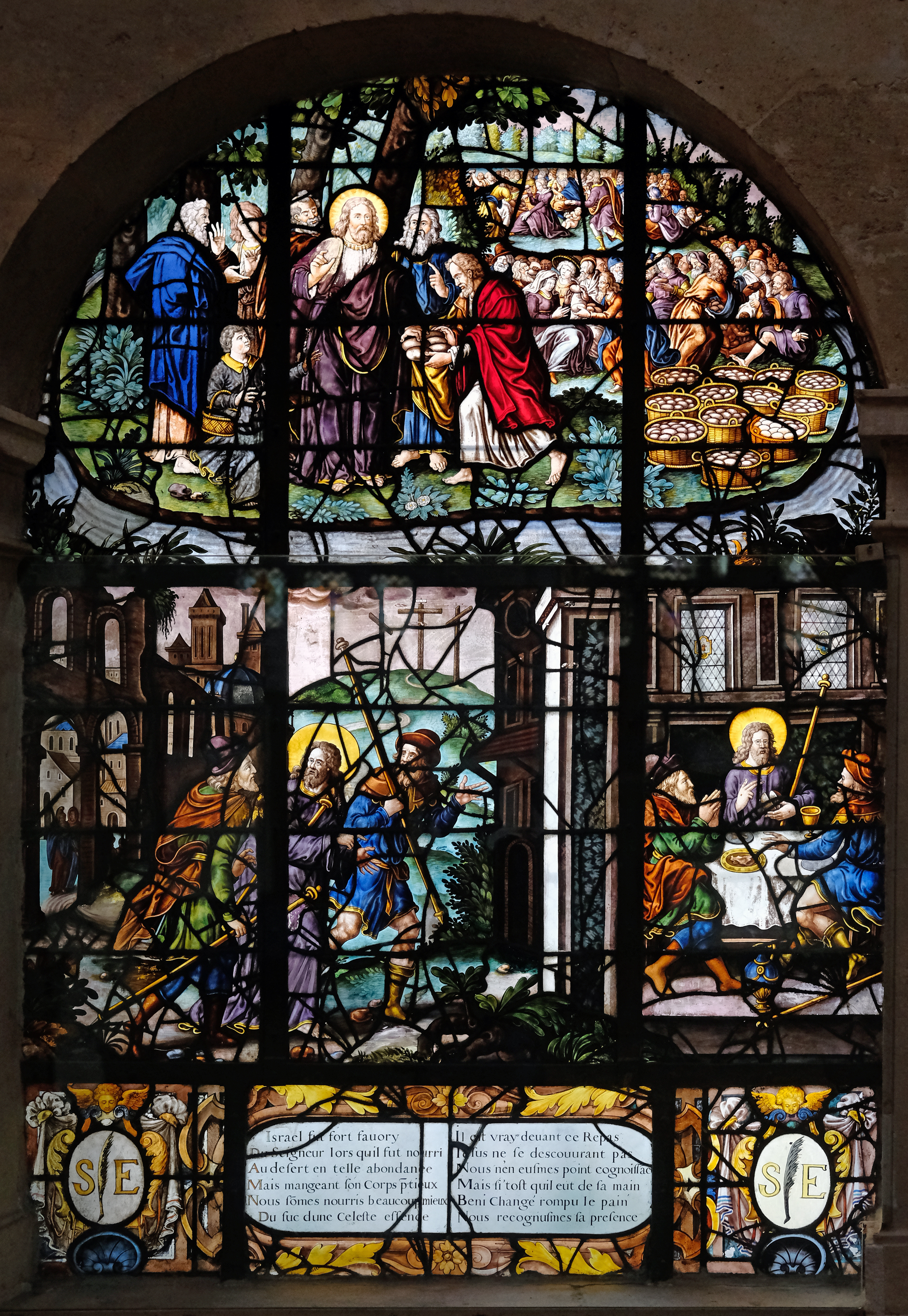
Window 3 – "Multiplication of the Loaves"

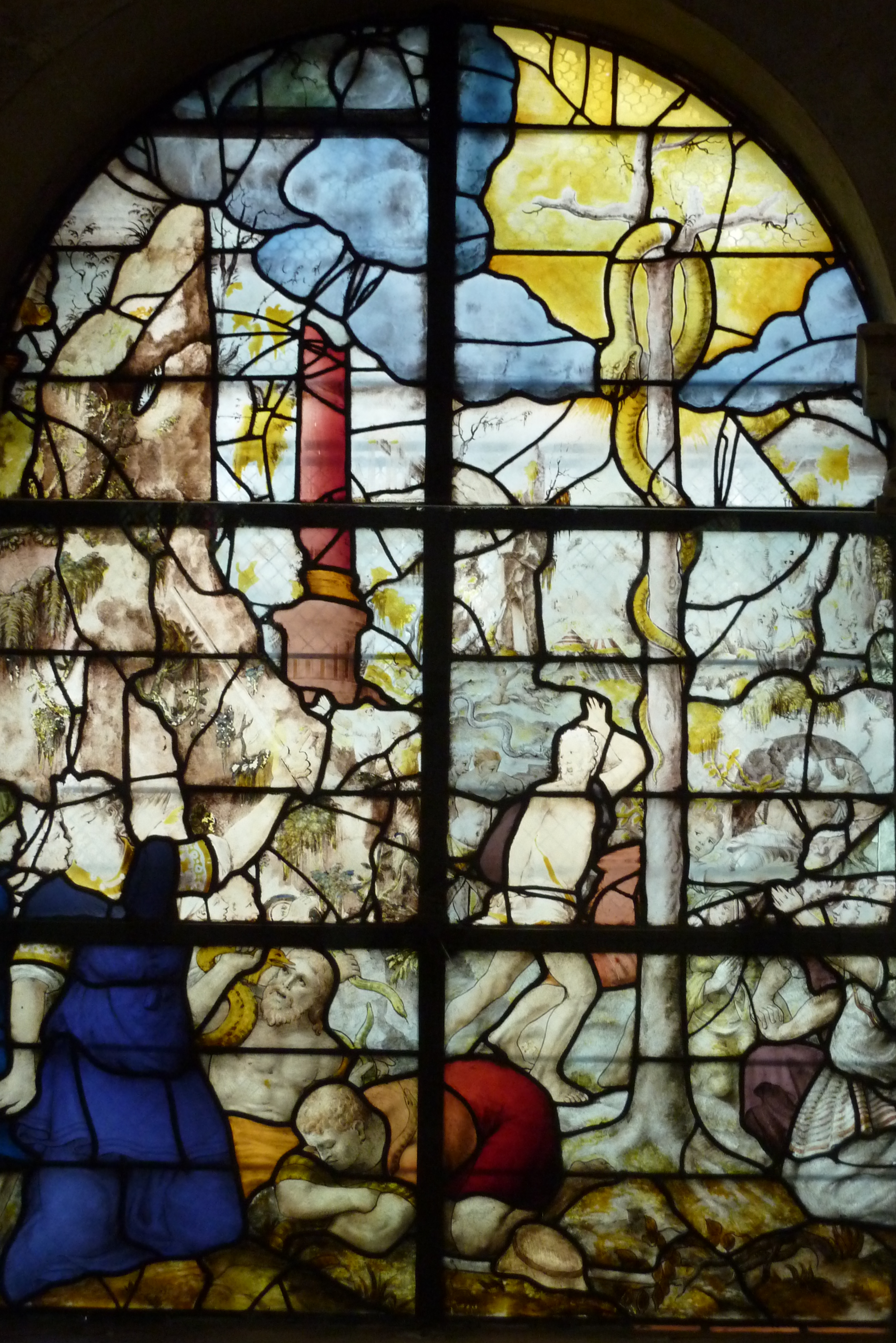
Window 4 – "The Brass Serpent"

=== Windows 5 & 6: "Passover" and "Rites of Purification" ===
The top left portion of Window Five depicts a traditional Jewish Passover supper, with lamb on the table. On the top right, exterminating angels are killing the first born in Egypt. The lower part of the window depicts a Christian passover, with the Holy Communion. On the right, devils are leading humans into temptation.

The "Rites of Purification" (Window Six) is a sort of visual textbook on that topic, and is also based on an engraving by L. Gaultier. On the top left, the Great Priest and three Levites are purifying themselves in a basin, known as the "Sea of Airan." On the right is an imaginative illustration of the Temple of Solomon. On the lower left Christ is washing the feet of the Apostles, and there is a depiction of an early Christian church.

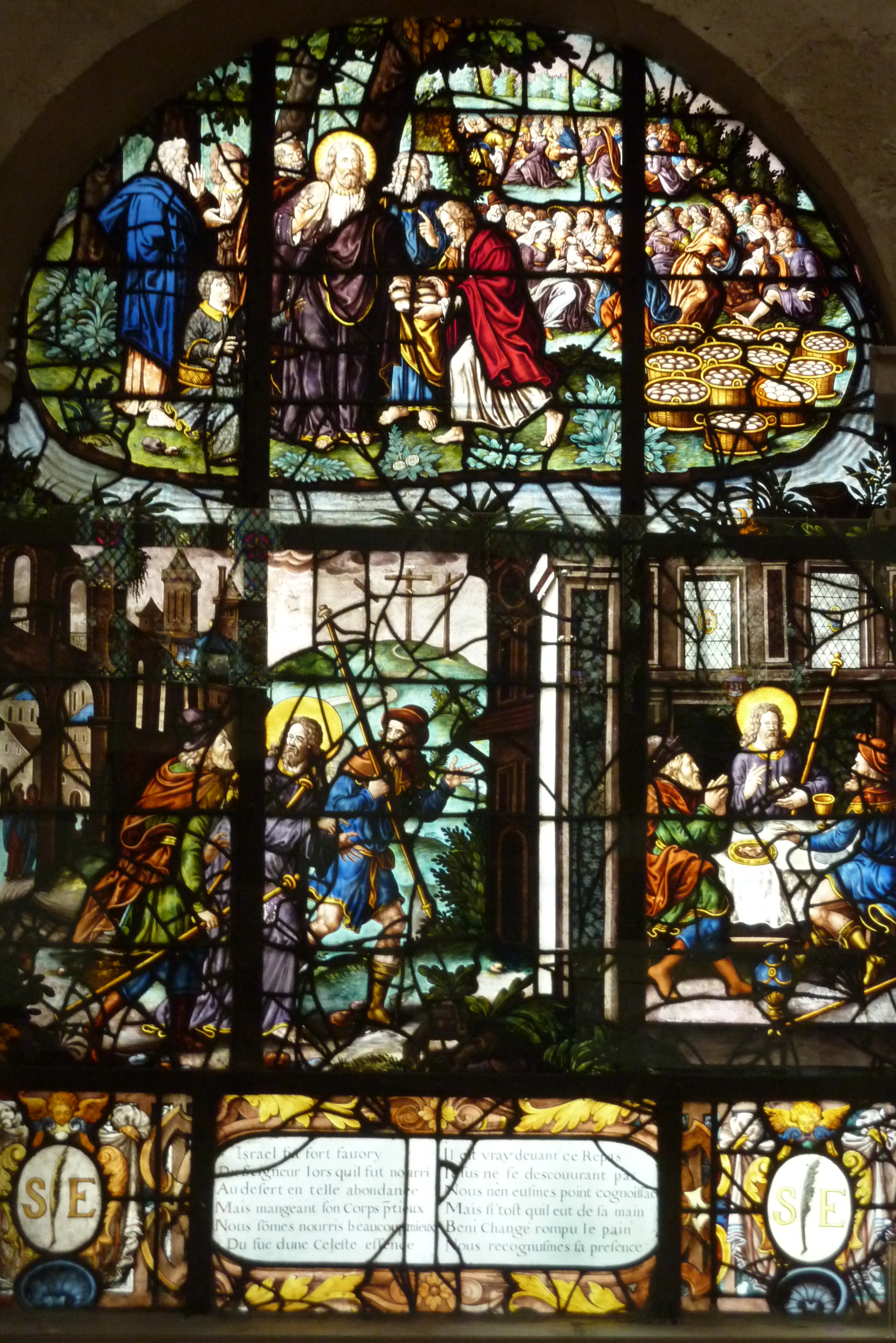
Window 5 – "Passover"

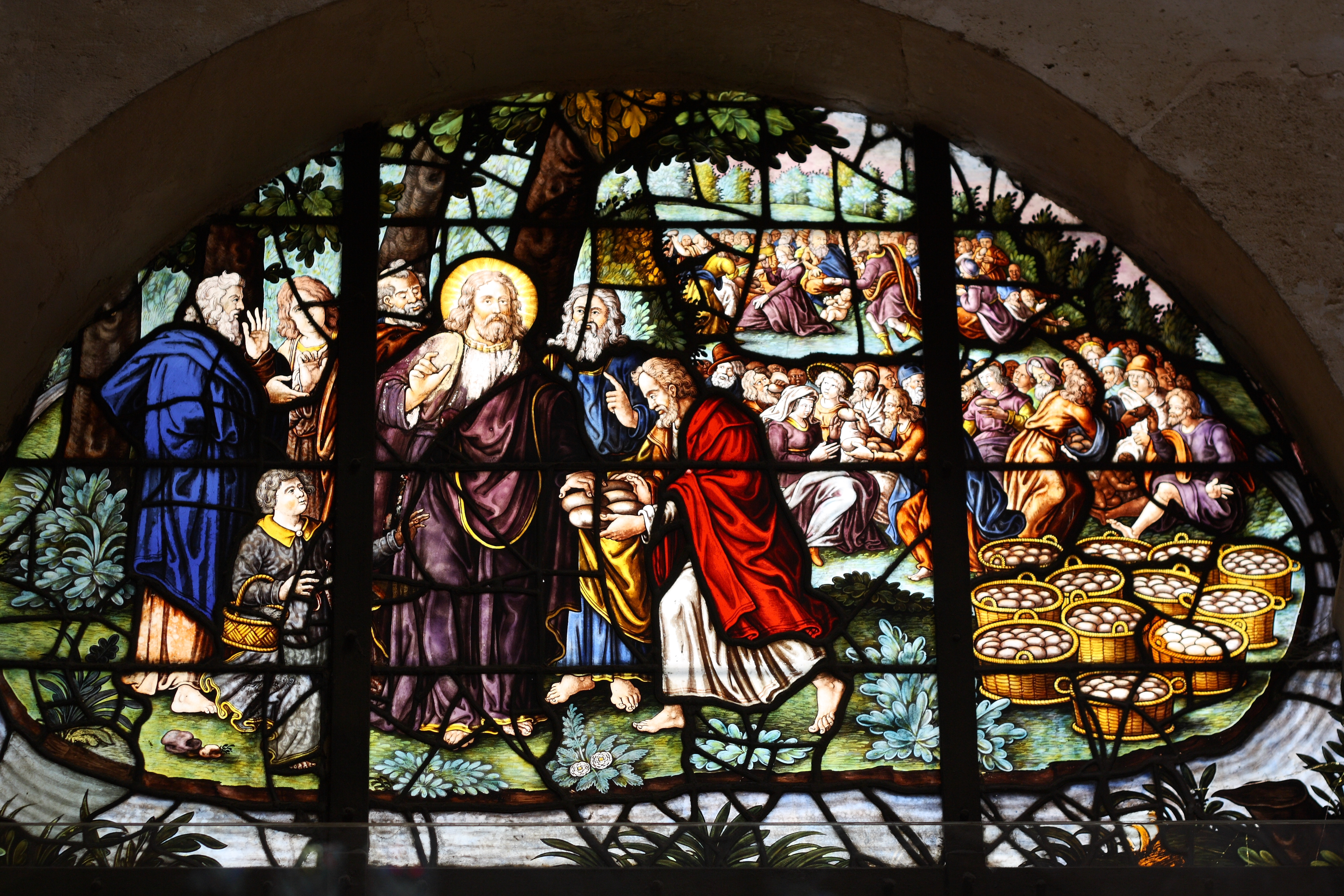
Window 5 detail, Christ multiplies the loaves of bread

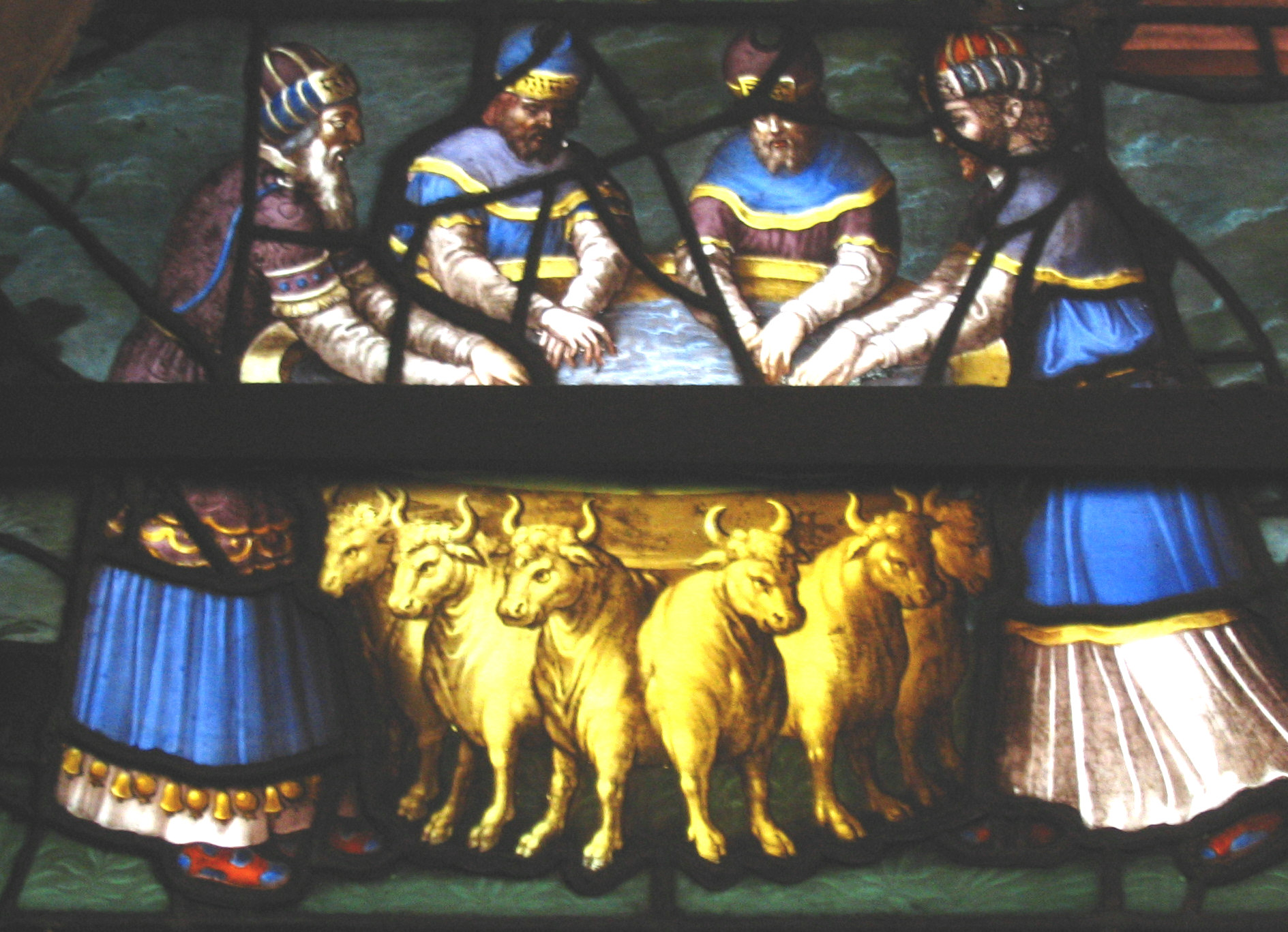
Detail of Window 6 – "Rites of Purification"; cleaning hands

=== Windows 7 & 8: "Elijah's Sacrifice" and the "Adoration of the Host" ===
Window Seven depicts the Sacrifice of Elijah, and his triumph over the pagan priest of Baal. In the window, a Celestial fire lights a sacrificial bonfire, while on the upper right the priests of Baal pray in vain.

Window Eight (restored in 2021), at the top shows the miracle of Manna, where bread was delivered in the wilderness. The lower portion depicts the Monstrance holding the Host, surrounded by Angels.

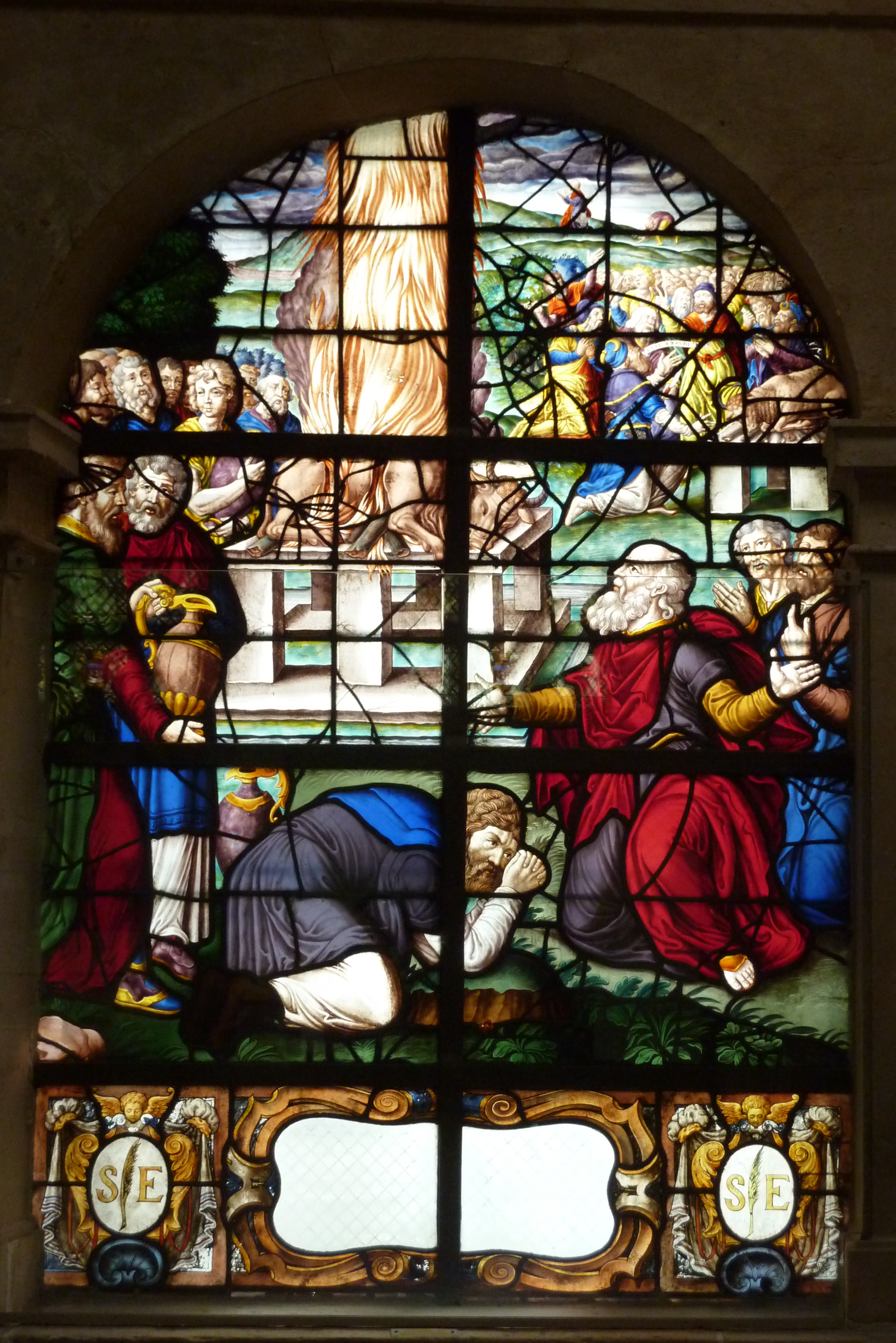
Window 7 – "Elijah's Sacrifice"

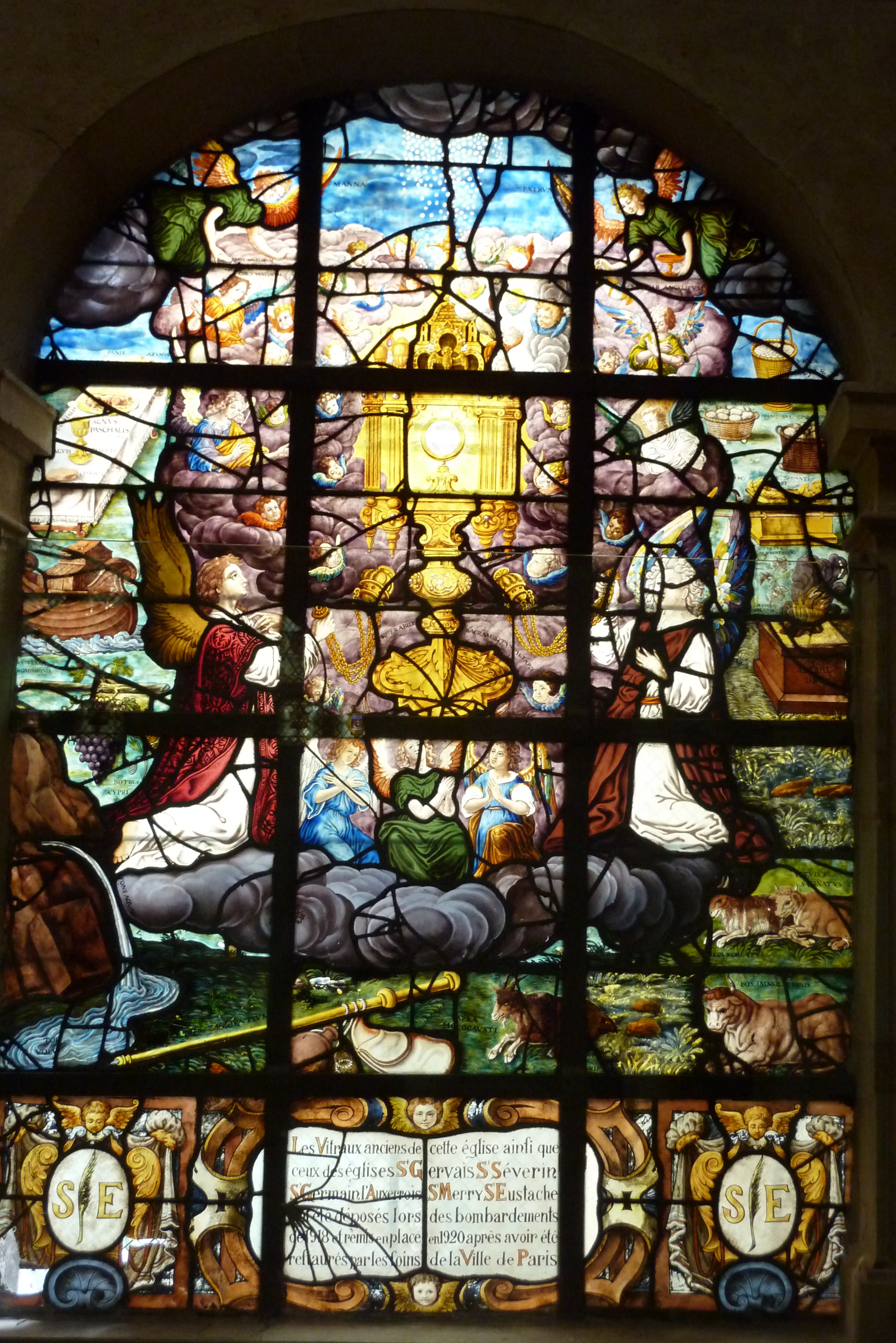
Window 8 – "Adoration of the Host"

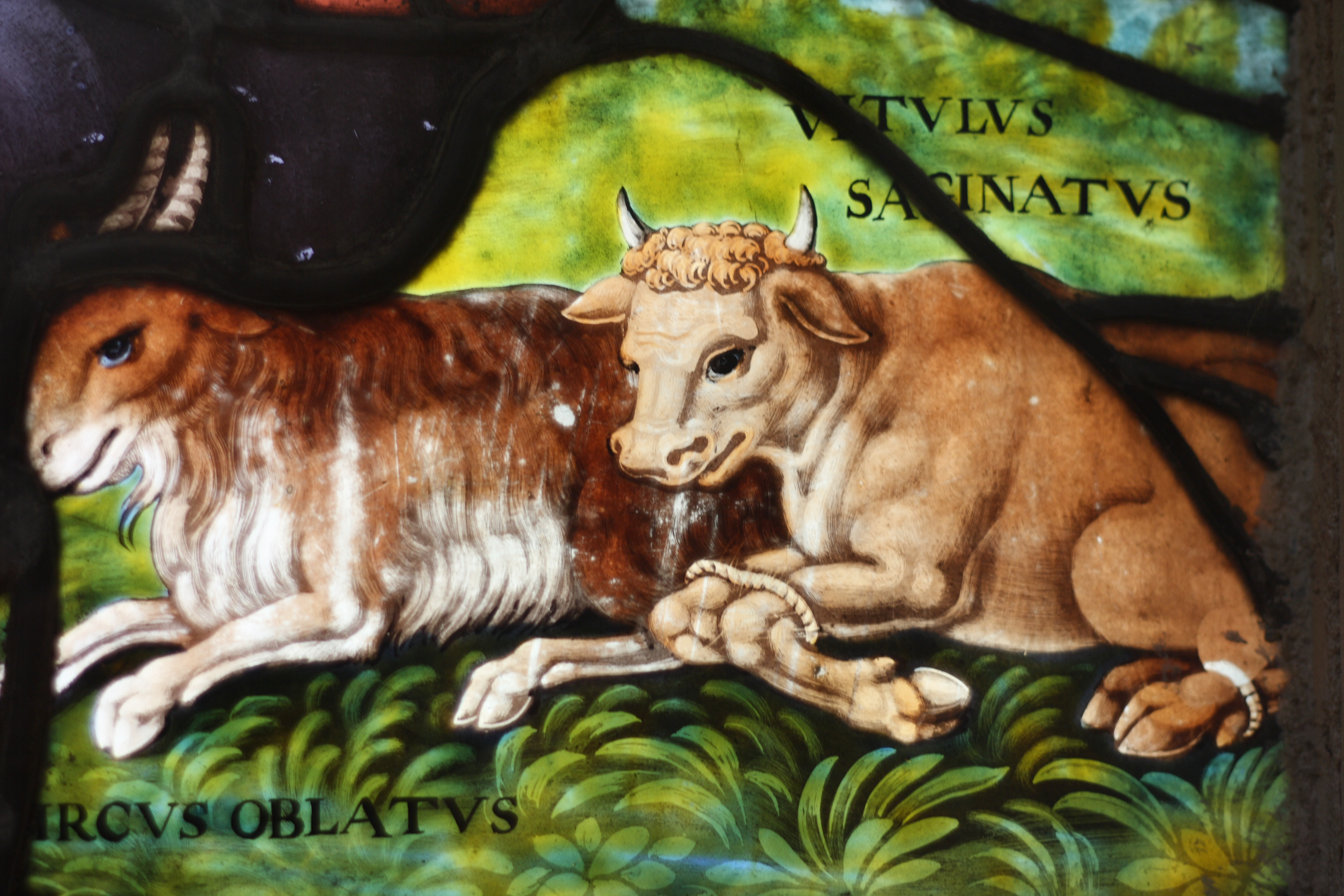
Detail of Window 8

=== Windows 9 & 10: the "Adoration of the Holy Sacrament" and "the Mystical Wine Press" (1618) ===
The "Mystical Wine Press" (1618) theme was inspired by an engraving by Jacques Lavolette printed in 1580. The subject is the blood of Christ, which is to be the mankind's salvation. In the center, Christ is distributing the redeeming blood. In the background of the window center, a barrel of the blood, accompanied by an angel, is being pulled by a lion, an ox and an eagle, the symbols of the Apostles Saints Luke, Mark and John. In the next portion of the window, the wine barrel is brought to a Church and distributed during the sacrameant of Eucharist. In the lower portion of the window, four doctors of the church, are storing the blood in barrels. On the right are Pope Paul III and King Louis IX of France (Saint Louis), Cardinal de Chatillon, and others, who are rolling the barrels into the cellar of a church.

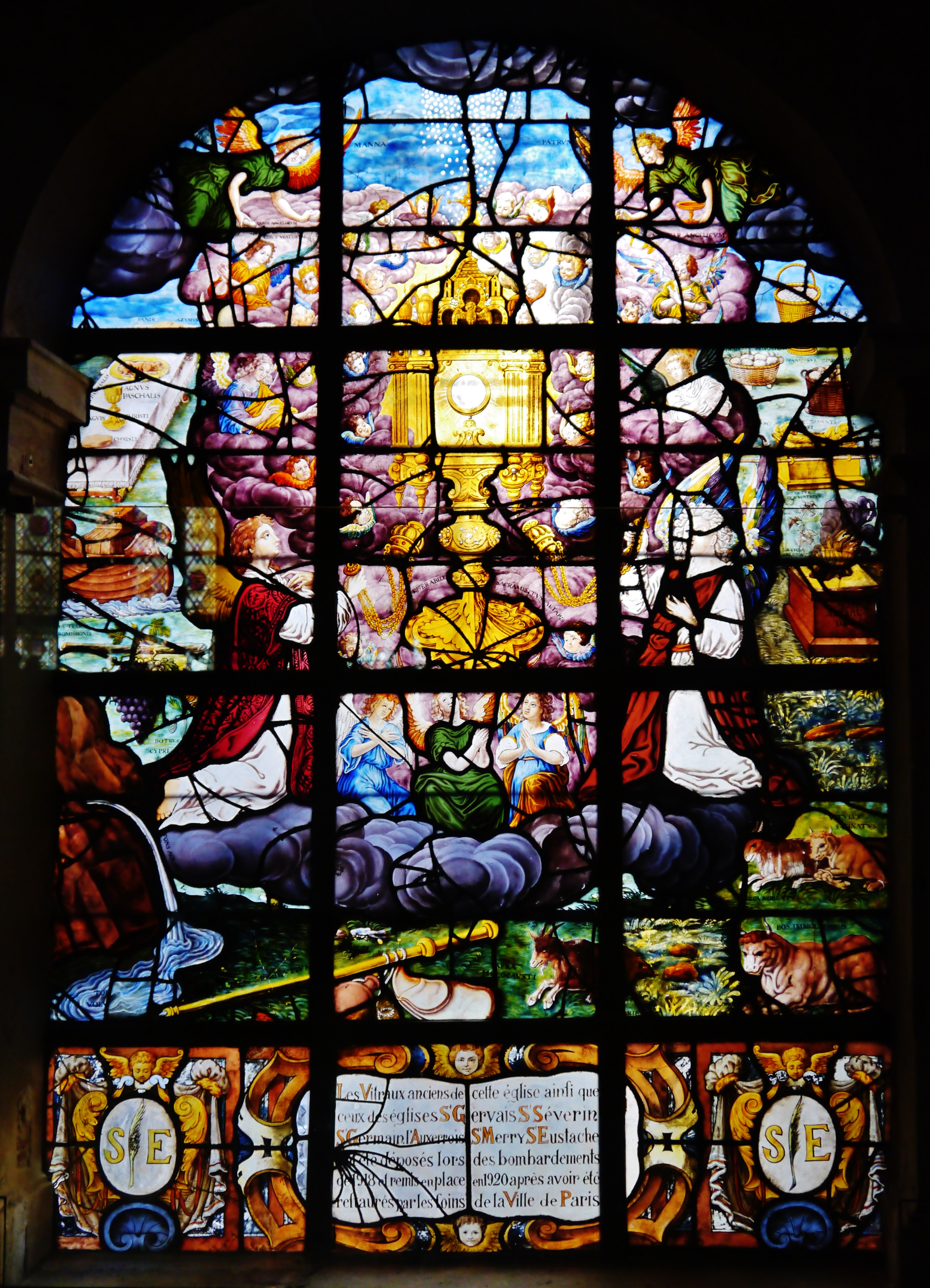
Window 9 – "Adoration of the Holy Sacrament" (1605–1609)

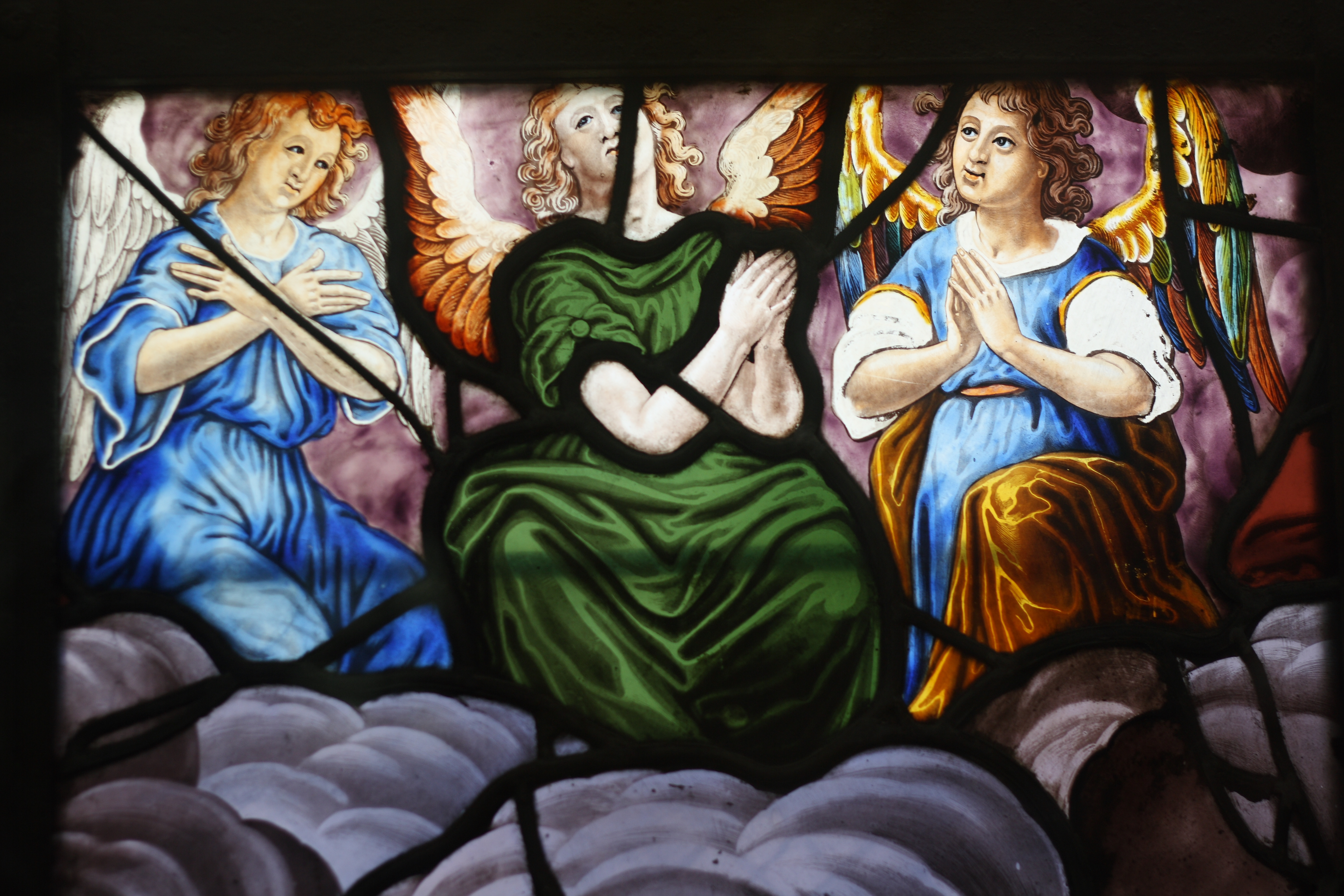
Detail from "Adoration of the Holy Sacrament" (1605–1609)

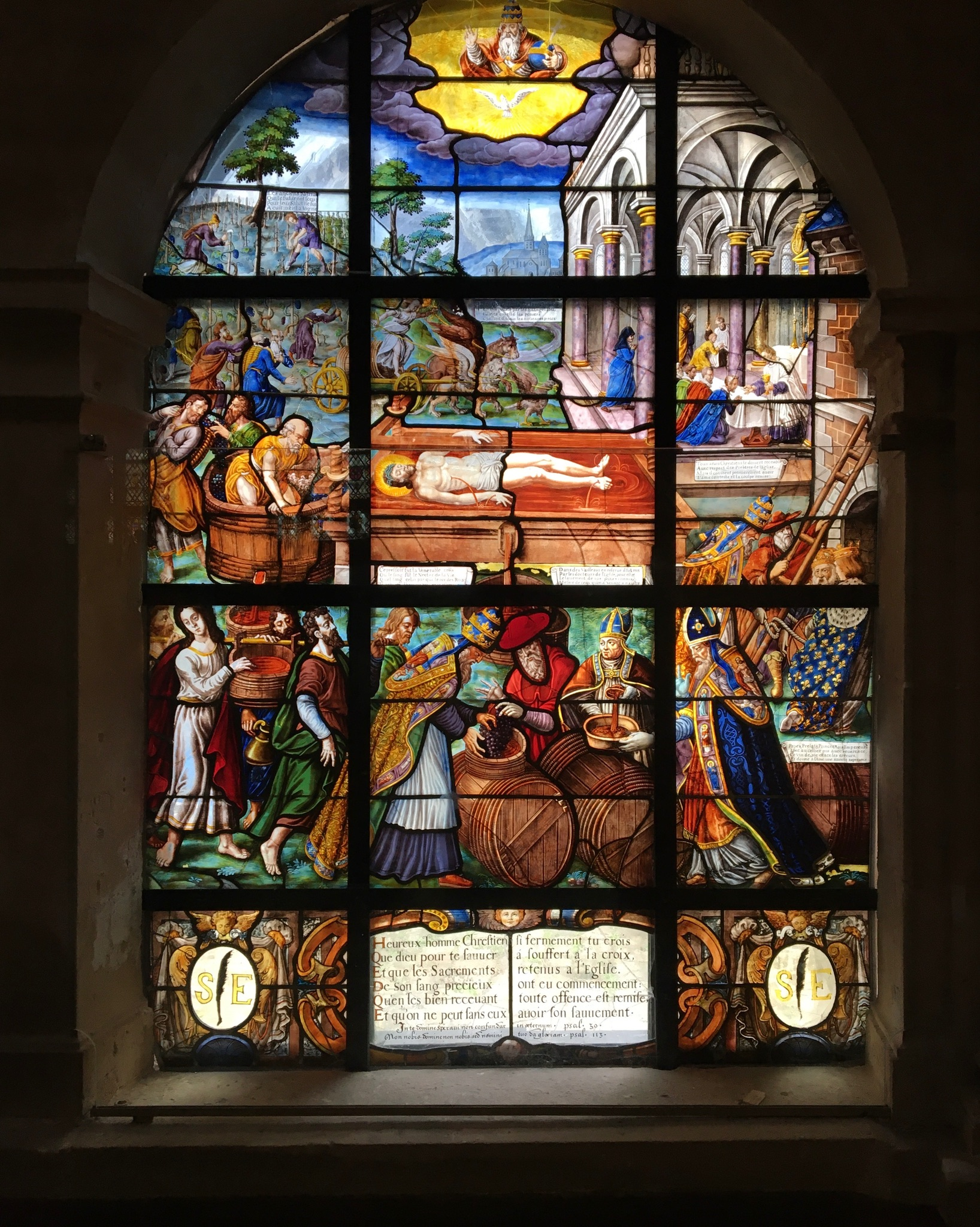
Window 10 – "the Mystical Wine Press" (1618)

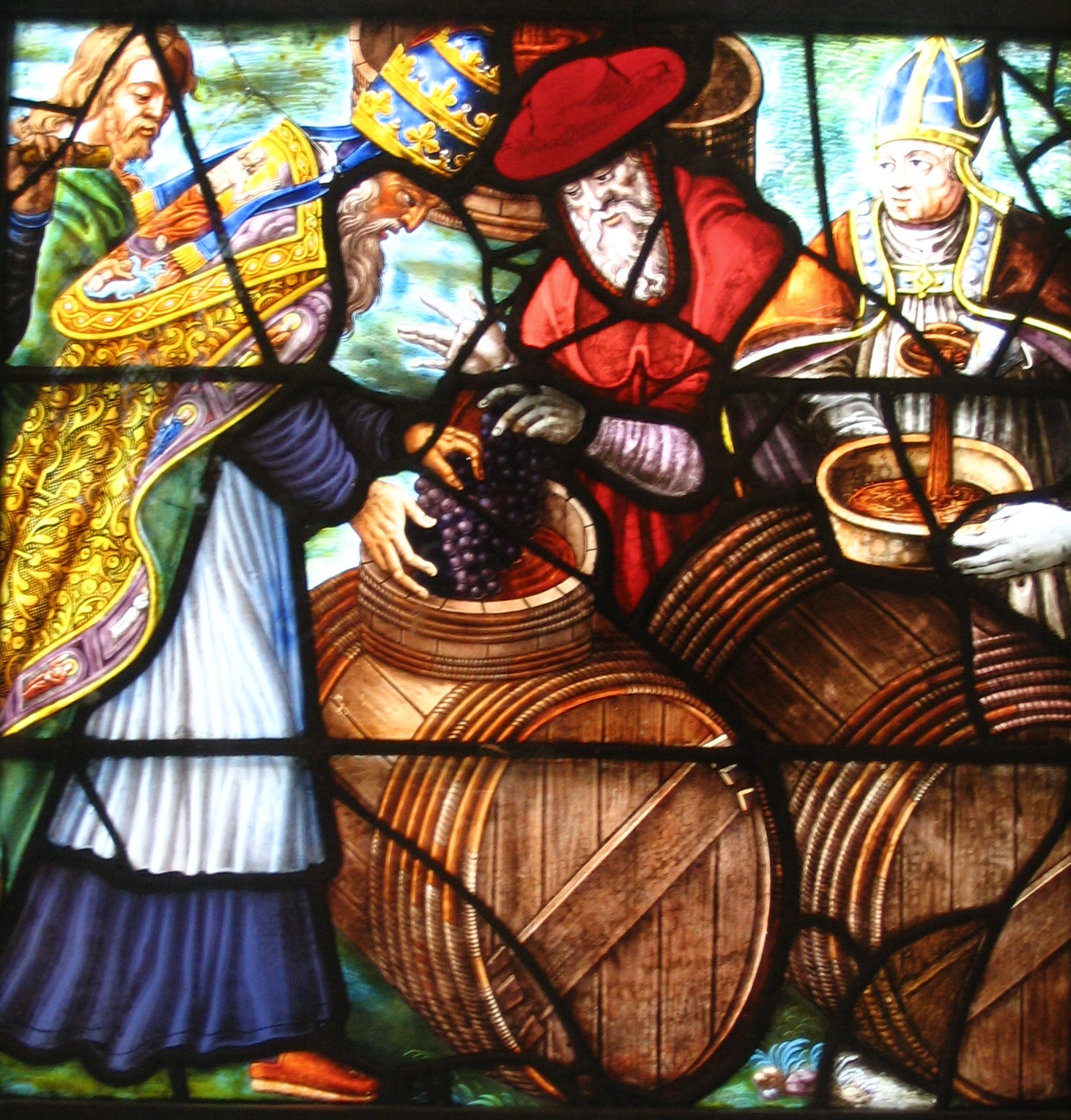
Detail of "the Mystical Wine Press" (1618)

=== Windows 11 & 12: Eucharist and the Oak of Moreh ===
Window Eleven has one 17th century section, at the top, depicting the origin of Eucharist, showing the blessing of wine and bread, and the Prophet Abraham returning home in triumph. Below are two later panels of glass, the Annunciation on the left (19th century), and the Last Supper (1612) inspired by Durer's "Great Passion of Christ".

Window Twelve illustrates the story of the Oak of Moreh, based on a text of Genesis 18 1–12. Abraham receives three mysterious angels, who promise he will have a son. They also forecast the destruction of the cities of Sodom and Gomorrah, shown on the above right.

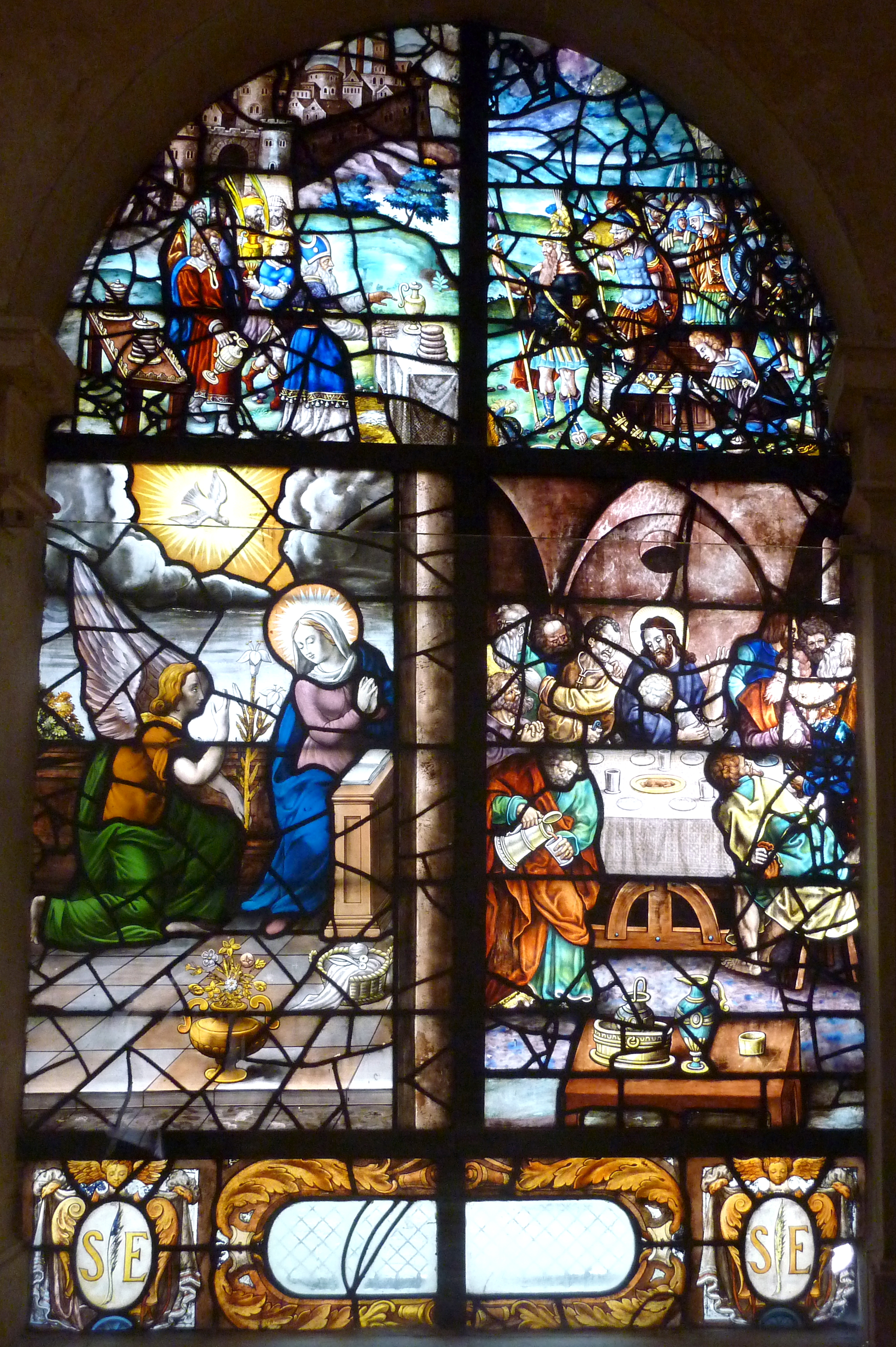
Window 11 – Eucharist

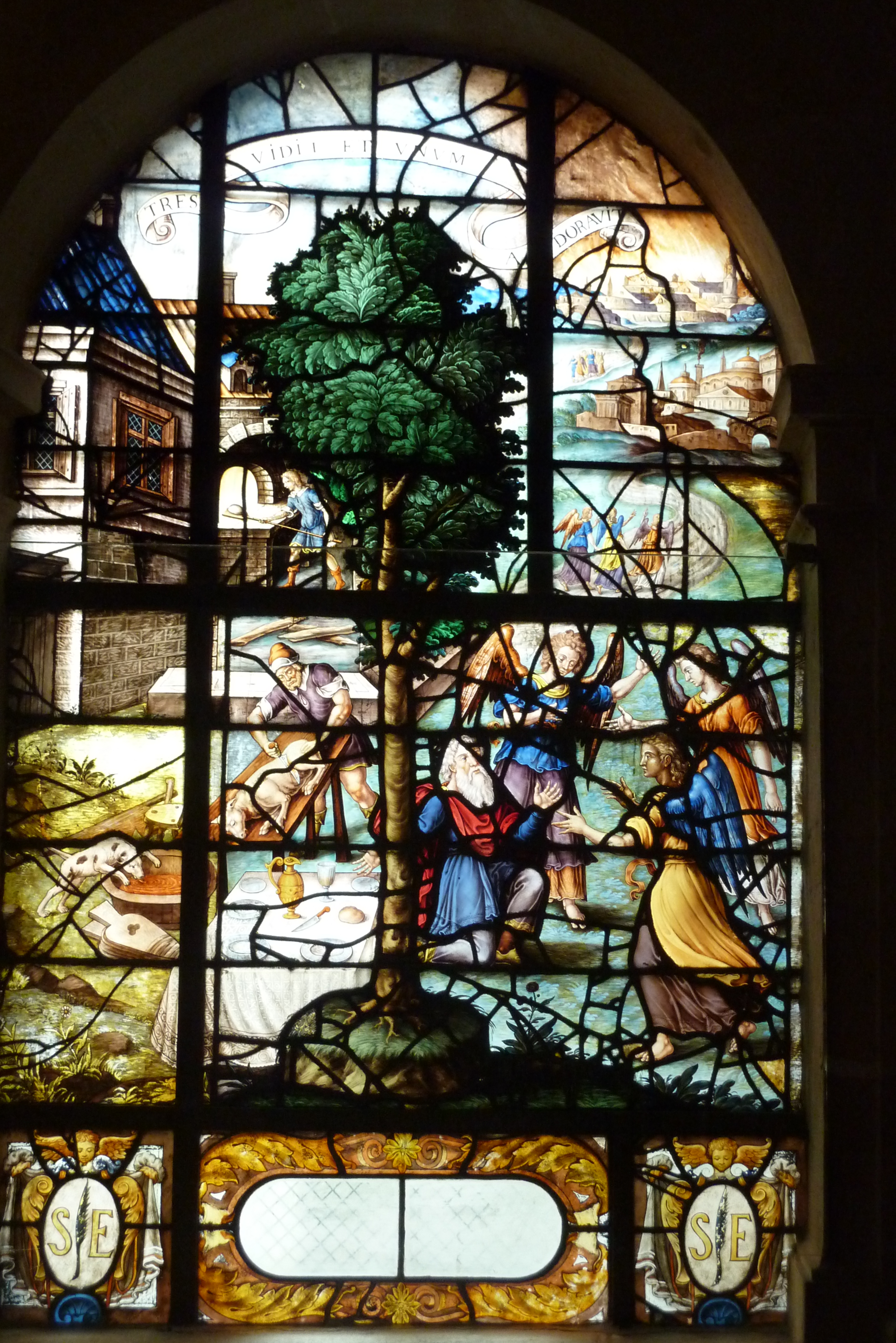
Window 12 – The Oak of Moreh

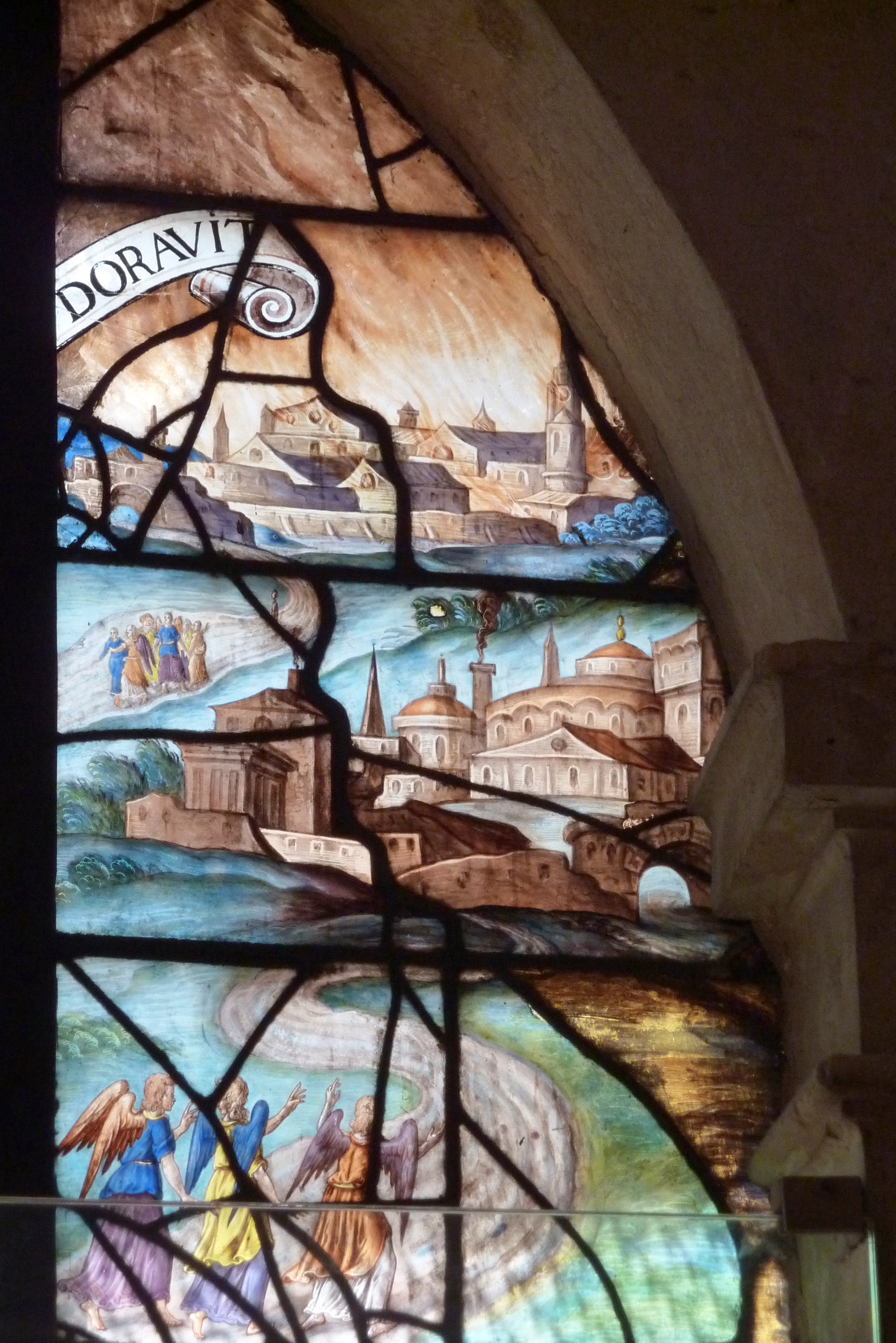
Window 12 – destruction of Sodom and Gomorrah

== Art and decoration ==
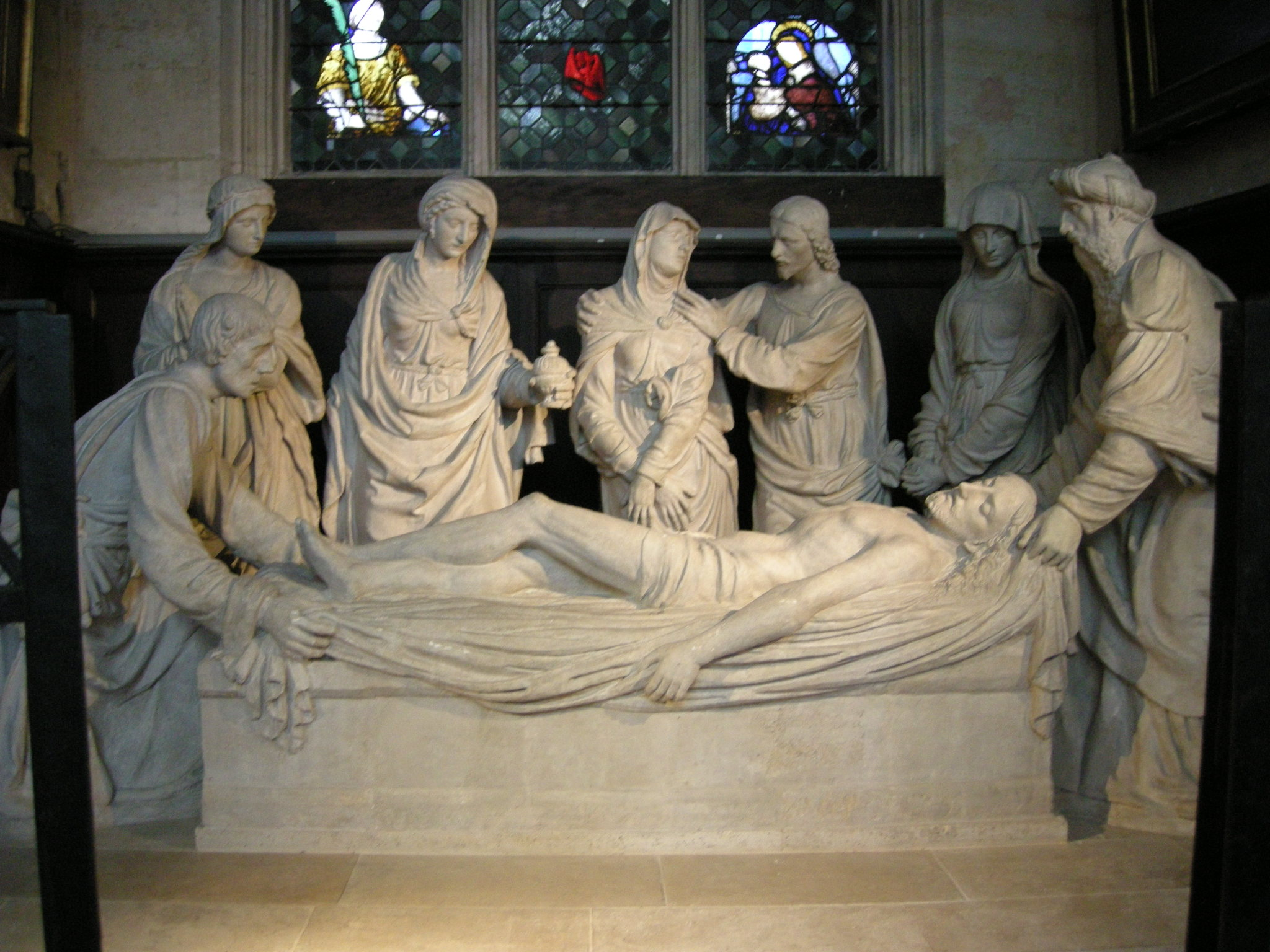
Christ placed in the tomb (Chapel of the Holy Sepulchre – 16th c.)

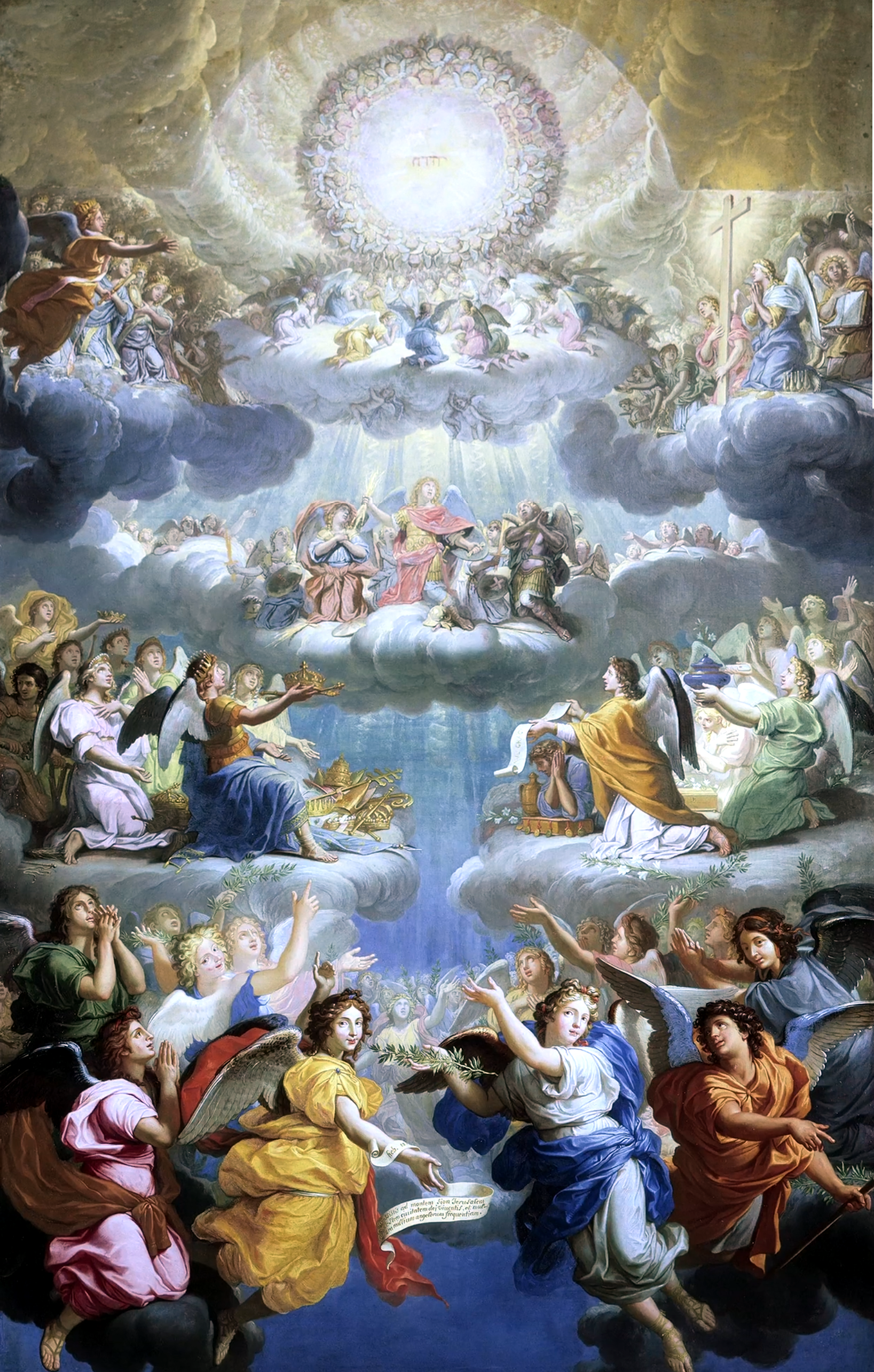
"The Nine Choirs of Angels", by Louis Licherie de Beurie (17th c.)

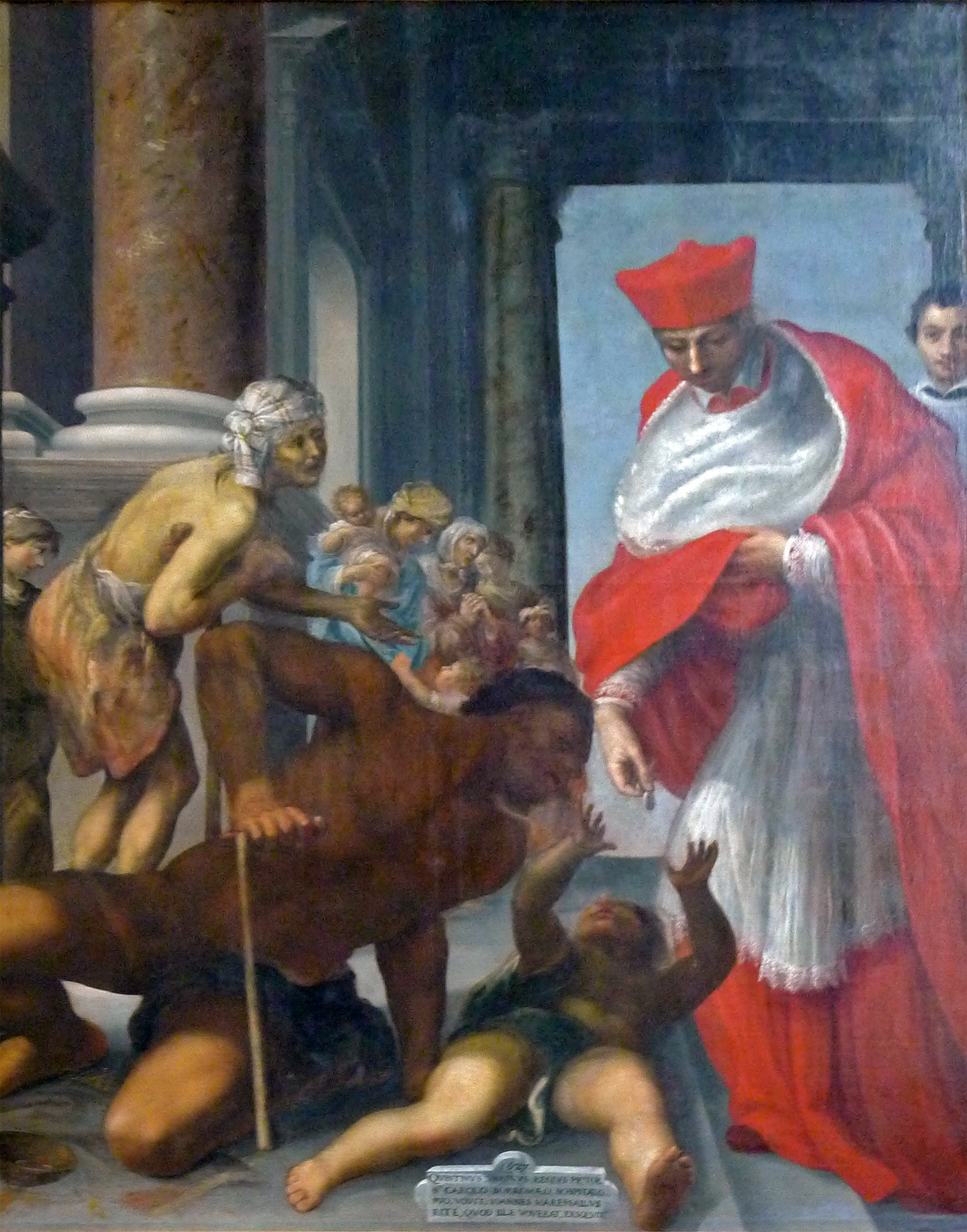
"Saint Charles Borromée distributing alms", by Quentin Varin (1627)

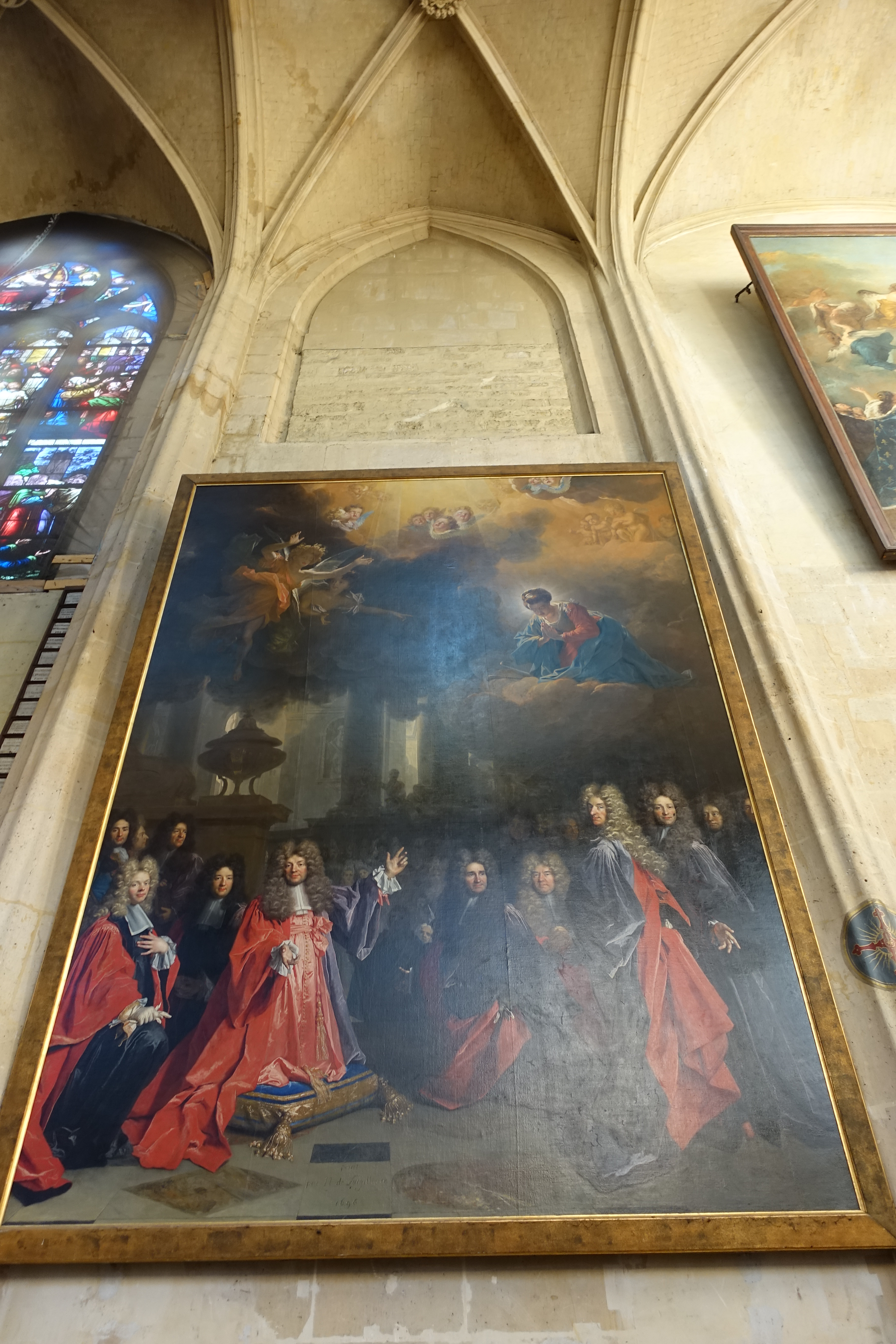
"Ex Voto to Saint Genevieve" by Nicolas de Largilliere (1696)

The chapels along the sides of the cathedral and side walls of the Chapel of St. Genevieve display sculpture and paintings by number of important 16th, 17th and 18th century artists, many of which are protected by the French Ministry of Culture. These include:

- "The Nine Choirs of Celestial Spirits", by Louis Licherie de Beurie (1629–1687) depicts, on a very large canvas, the hierarchy of the angels, below the word "Jehovah" in Hebrew letters, including, at the top, the senior angels, the Seraphim, down to the lowest ranks at the bottom. (Chapel of the Crucifix).
- A group of eight life-size eight stone and terra cotta sculptures representing the stages of the placement of Christ's body in the tomb. (Chapel of the Holy Sepulchre). (Side wall of the Chapel of Saint-Genevieve).
- "Saint Charles Borromée distributing alms", by Quentin Varin (1627), depicting the Bishop of Milan distributing alms to the people of Milan during the famine of 1570 and the plague of 1576. (Chapel of Saint-Charles-Borromée)
- "Ex Voto to Saint Genevieve", by Nicolas de Largilliere (1696), a very large canvas which commemorates the annual 1694 procession of the tomb of Saint Genevieve, which was made to bring an end to a draught and famine which had struck Paris that year. According to tradition, at the end of the procession, it suddenly began to rain, ending the drought. It was commissioned by the provosts of the merchants and magistrates of Paris. At the top of the picture are angels, in the center is Saint Geneviève, praying, with the rain clouds she has summoned, and at the bottom are very fine portraits of the magistrates of Paris in 1694.

== The Presbytere ==
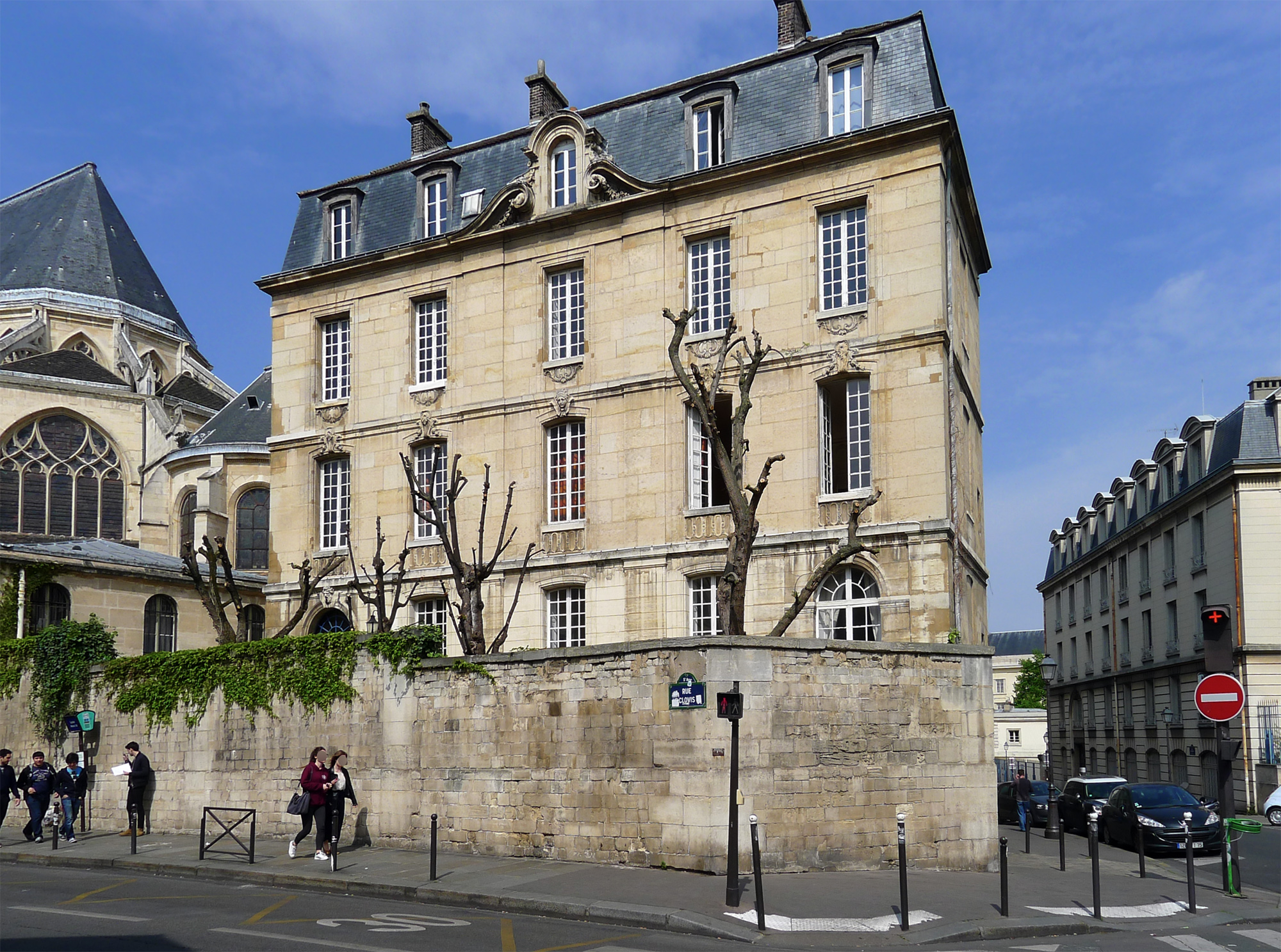
The Presbytere, clerical residence (18th c.)

The Prebytere was built next to the church in about 1725 as the private residence of Louis, Duke of Orleans, son of the Regent of France. It was purchased by the church and is now the residence of the curé of the church, and a protected historical landmark.

== The organ ==
In 1636, the organ, built by Pierre Pescheur, was installed. When the organ was damaged by fire in 1760, it was rebuilt by Cliquot. Further work was carried out in 1863 by Cavaillé-Coll, and the present instrument is the work of further revision by Beuchet-Debierre in 1956.

The case of the organ of the tribune was made beginning in 1633 by Jean Buron, and is the oldest and best-preserved original case in Paris. It is topped by sculpture of Christ surrounded by angels playing the kinnor, an ancient Hebrew variation of the lyre.

Renowned organist, composer, and improviser Maurice Duruflé held the post of Titular Organist at Saint-Étienne-du-Mont from 1929 until 1953, after which he shared it with his wife, Marie-Madeleine Duruflé, until 1975.

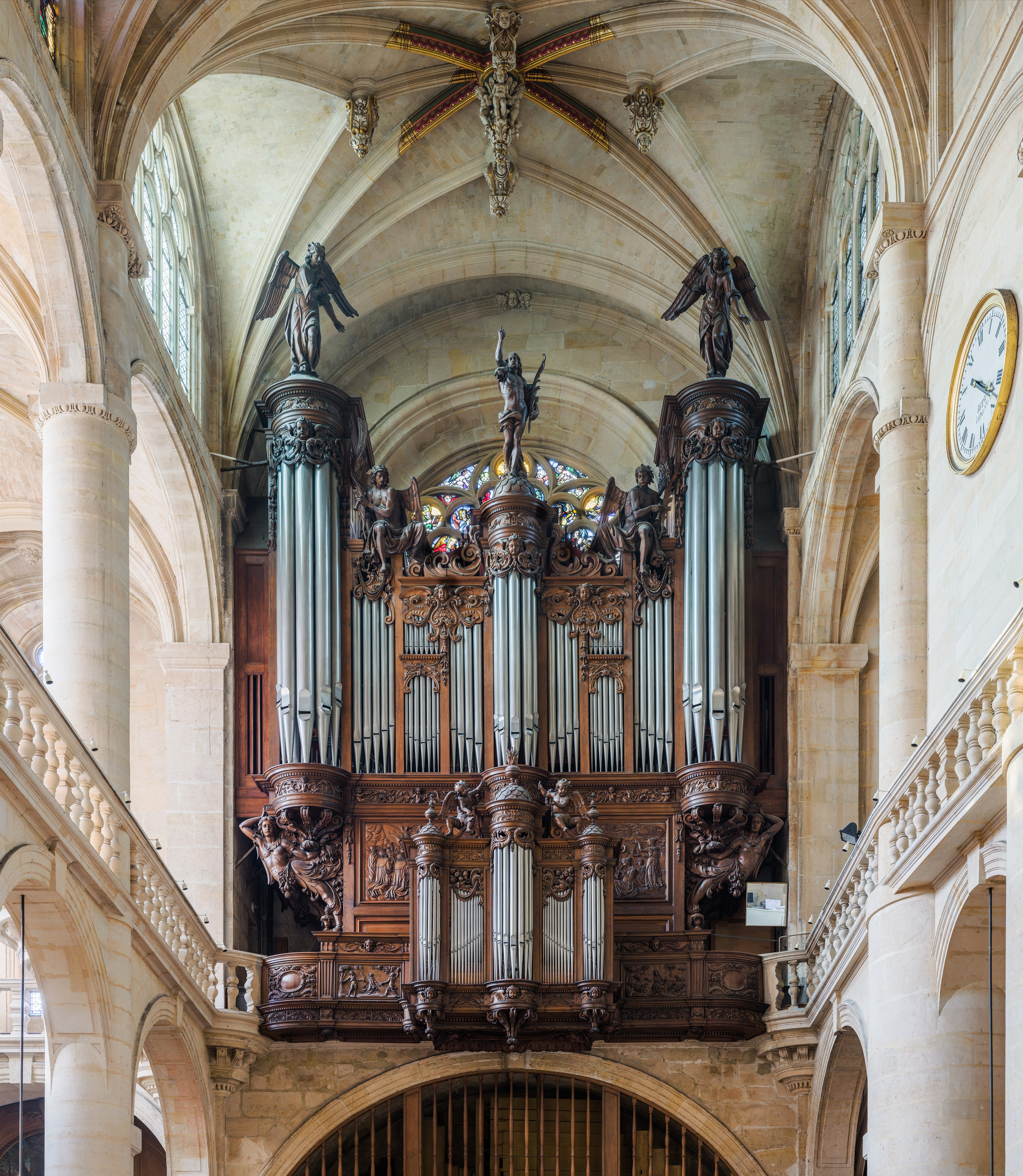
The organ of the tribune

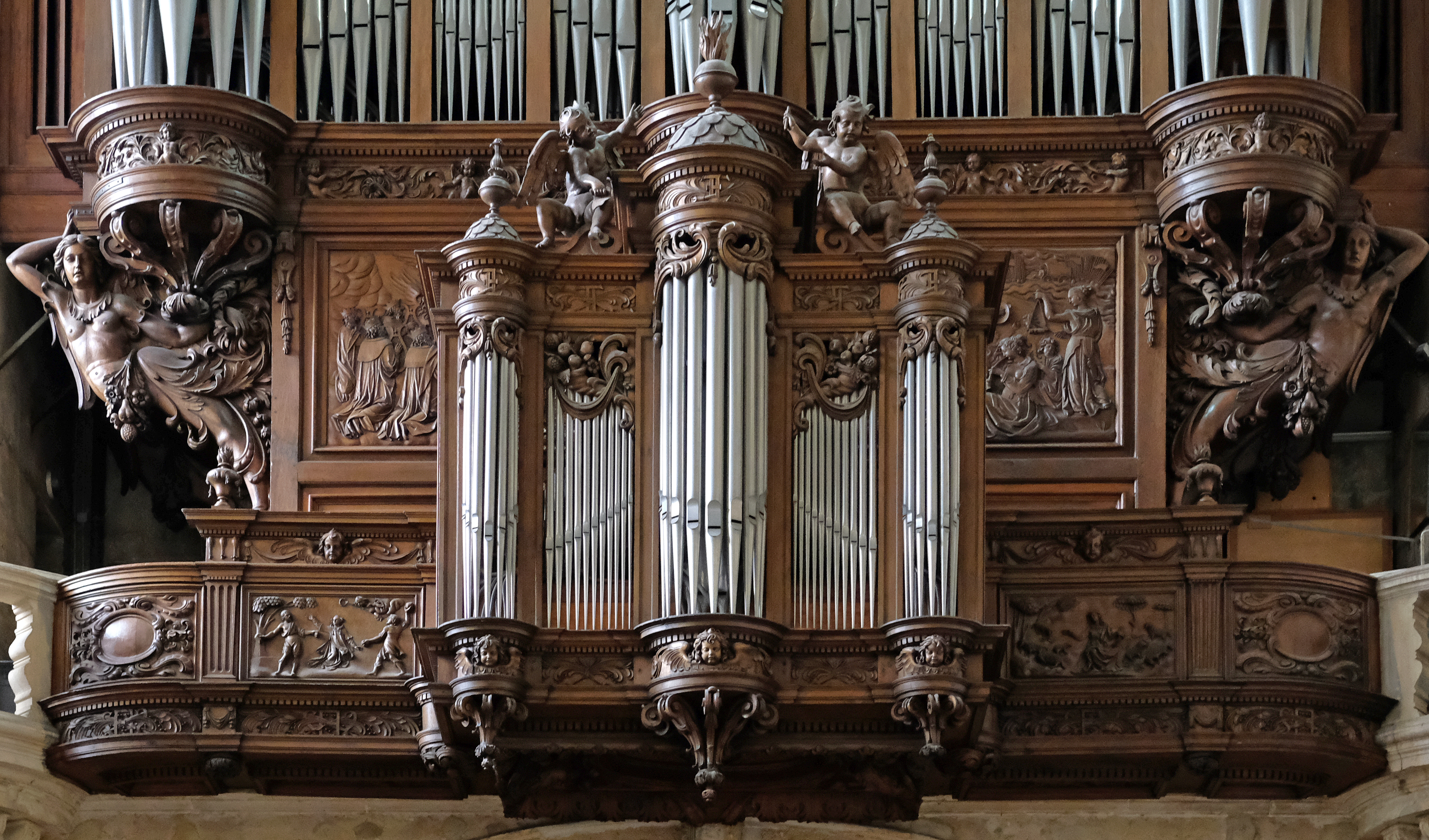
The case of the organ, installed in 1633

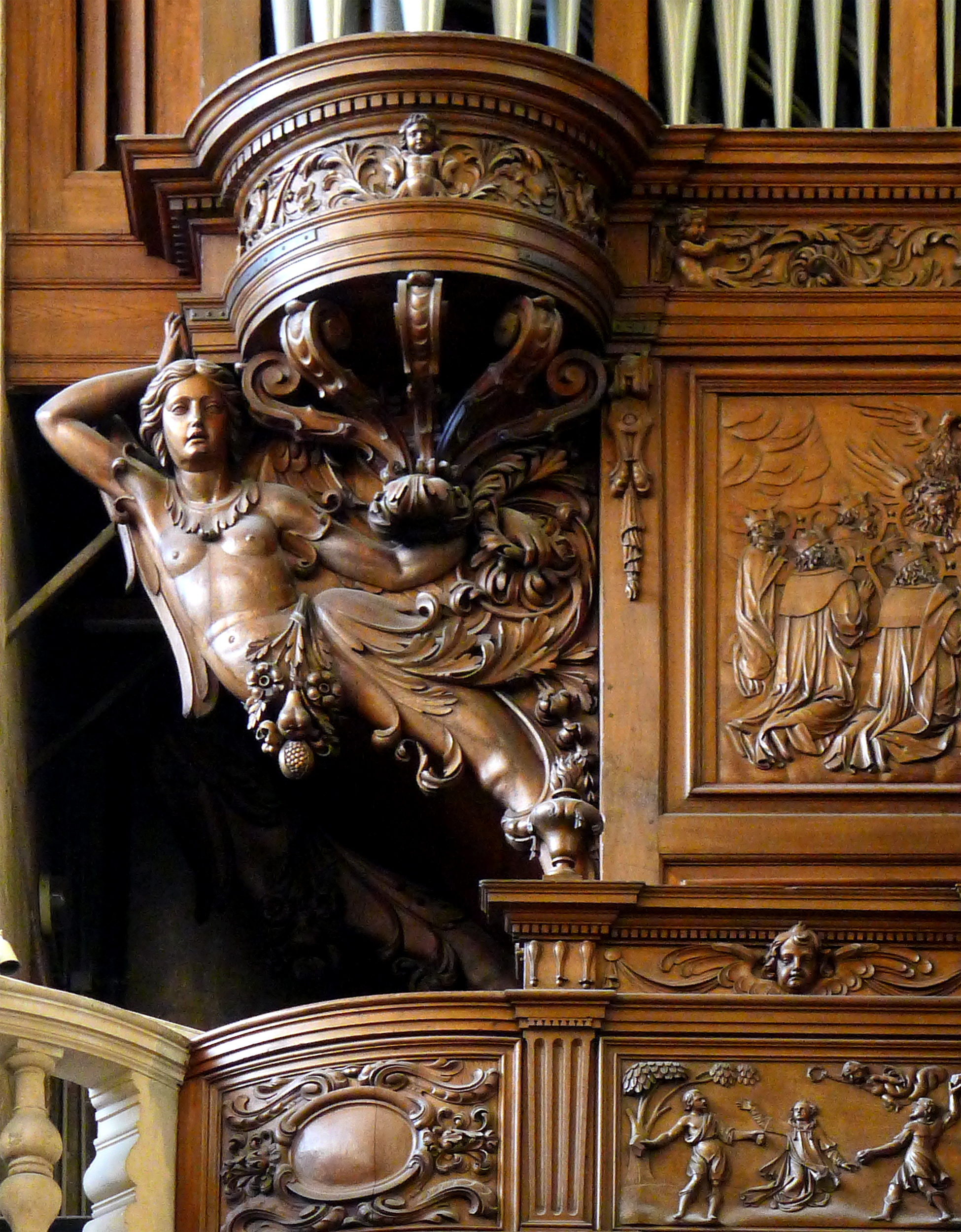
Detail of the organ case (1633)

== See also ==
- List of historic churches in Paris

== Bibliography (in French) ==
- Dumoulin, Aline; Ardisson, Alexandra; Maingard, Jérôme; Antonello, Murielle; Églises de Paris (2010), Éditions Massin, Issy-Les-Moulineaux, ISBN 978-2-7072-0683-1
- Hamon, Étienne; Françoise Gatouillat (2016). Saint-Étienne-du-Mont: Un chef-d'oeuvre parisien de la Renaissance (with contribution of Henri de Rohan-Csermak). Paris: Picard. ISBN 978-2-7084-1019-0.
