= Genevieve =

Patron saint of Paris

Saint Genevieve
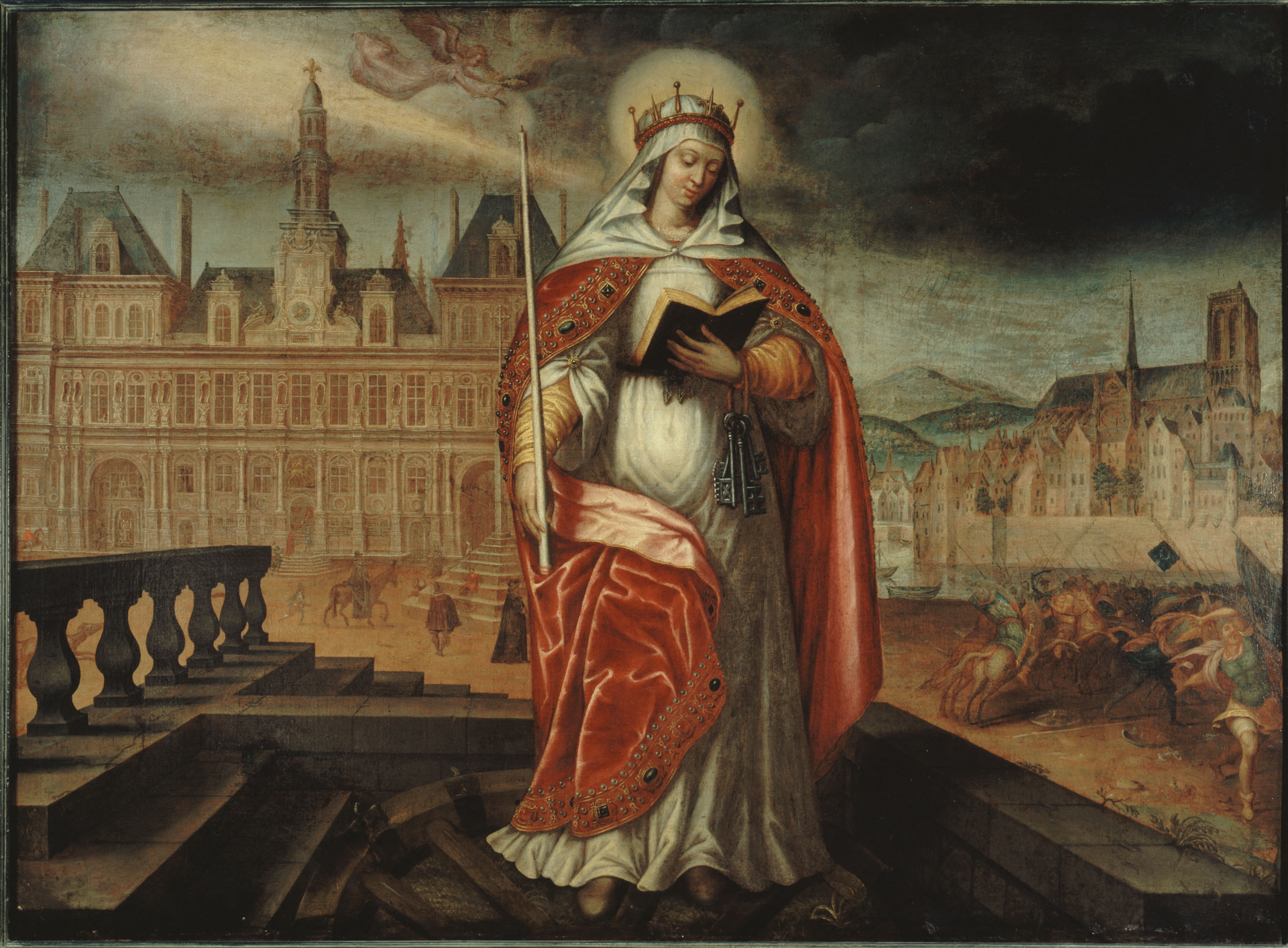
- Saint Genevieve, 17th-century painting, Musée Carnavalet, Paris

Virgin
- Born: c. 419–422; Nemetodurum, Western Roman Empire
- Died: 502–512 (aged 79–93); Paris, Francia
- Venerated in: Catholic Church; Eastern Orthodox Church
- Canonized: Pre-congregation
- Feast: 3 January, translation of relics (in Paris) 28 October, elevation of the relics 10 January
- Attributes: Lit candle, breviary, angels and demons, liturgical vessel, crown, keys of the city of Paris
- Patronage: Paris, shepherds, winemakers, wax-chandlers, hatmakers; against eye complaints, fever, plagues, drought, war

Genevieve (French: Sainte Geneviève; Latin: Genovefa; and Genofeva; c. 419/422 AD – 502/512 AD) was a consecrated virgin, and is one of the patron saints of Paris in the Catholic Church, and she is also venerated in the Eastern Orthodox Church. Her feast day is on 3 January.

Recognized for her religious devotion at a young age, she met Germanus of Auxerre and Lupus of Troyes when she was a child and dedicated herself to a virginal life. Miracles and healings began to happen around her early on, and she became known for changing the weather. She moved from Nanterre, her hometown, to Paris after her parents died and became known for her piety, healings, and miracles, although the residents of Paris resented her and would have killed her if not for Germanus's interventions. Her prayers saved Paris from being destroyed by the Huns under Attila in 451 and other wars; her organisation of the city's women was called a "prayer marathon" and Genevieve's "most famous feat". She was involved in two major construction projects in Paris, a basilica in the honour of Saint Denis of Paris in 475 and the Basilica of the Holy Apostles, dedicated to Saint Peter and Saint Paul c. 500.

She was recognized as the patron saint of Paris in the 14th century. She was "a favorite of both the humblest residents and of the Bourbon family, and was equally venerated by Erasmus and revolutionary fishwives" and was considered "a cultural symbol which Parisians shared, appropriated, negotiated, and used according to specific communal assumptions and traditions".

Genevieve was publicly invoked during emergencies related to the needs and expectations of the residents of Paris 153 times between 885 and October 1791, ranging from spontaneous and less-ritualized invocations and processions with her reliquary during the Middle Ages to highly ritualized ones said before her unveiled reliquary in the years leading up to the French Revolution. As times and conditions changed in Paris, so did the ways in which Genevieve was invoked and processed. As new calamities threatened the city and new intercessions to her were needed, new associations, images, and metaphors were required. Devotion to her remained popular throughout the history of Paris, although devotion to her has never returned to its pre-Revolutionary popularity and unifying status.

== Life ==
=== Early life ===
Genevieve was born c. 419 or 422 in Nanterre, near Paris, to Severus, a Romanized Frank working as a civil magistrate for the Empire, and his wife Geroncia. A candle is one of her most common attributes; she is sometimes depicted with the devil, who is said to have blown out her candle when she prayed at night.

Genevieve appears in the Martyrology of Jerome; her vita appeared many centuries after her death, although hagiographer Donald Attwater states that her vita claims to be written by a contemporary of Genevieve and "Its authenticity and value are the subject of much discussion". According to historian Moshe Sluhovsky, the Vita of Sainte Geneviève was written shortly after her death, in the late 500s and was based upon the vita of Martin of Tours. In 1310, the first French edition of her vita was published; in 1367, the first French translation was published. As David Farmer states, "little can be known about her with certainty, but her cult has flourished on civil and national pride".

Even though popular tradition represents Genevieve's parents as poor peasants, their names, which were common amongst the Gallo-Roman aristocracy, are considered evidence that she was born into the Gallic upper class. She was recognised for her religious devotion from an early age. When Genevieve was seven years old (c. 429), Germanus of Auxerre and Lupus of Troyes stopped at Nanterre on their way to Britain from Gaul to put an end to the Pelagian heresy. Germanus saw Genevieve in a crowd of villagers who gathered to meet and obtain Germanus's and Lupus's blessing and observed her thoughtfulness and piety. After speaking to her and encouraging her "to persevere in the path of virtue", Germanus interviewed her parents and told them that she would "be great before the face of the Lord" and that by her example, lead and teach many consecrated virgins. As Sluhovsky states, "Miracles marking the young girl as a bride of Christ followed". Genevieve told Germanus that she wanted to follow God; according to her vita, Germanus confirmed her desire to become a consecrated virgin, plucked a coin from the ground, and instructed her to have a necklace made from it to remind her about their meeting.

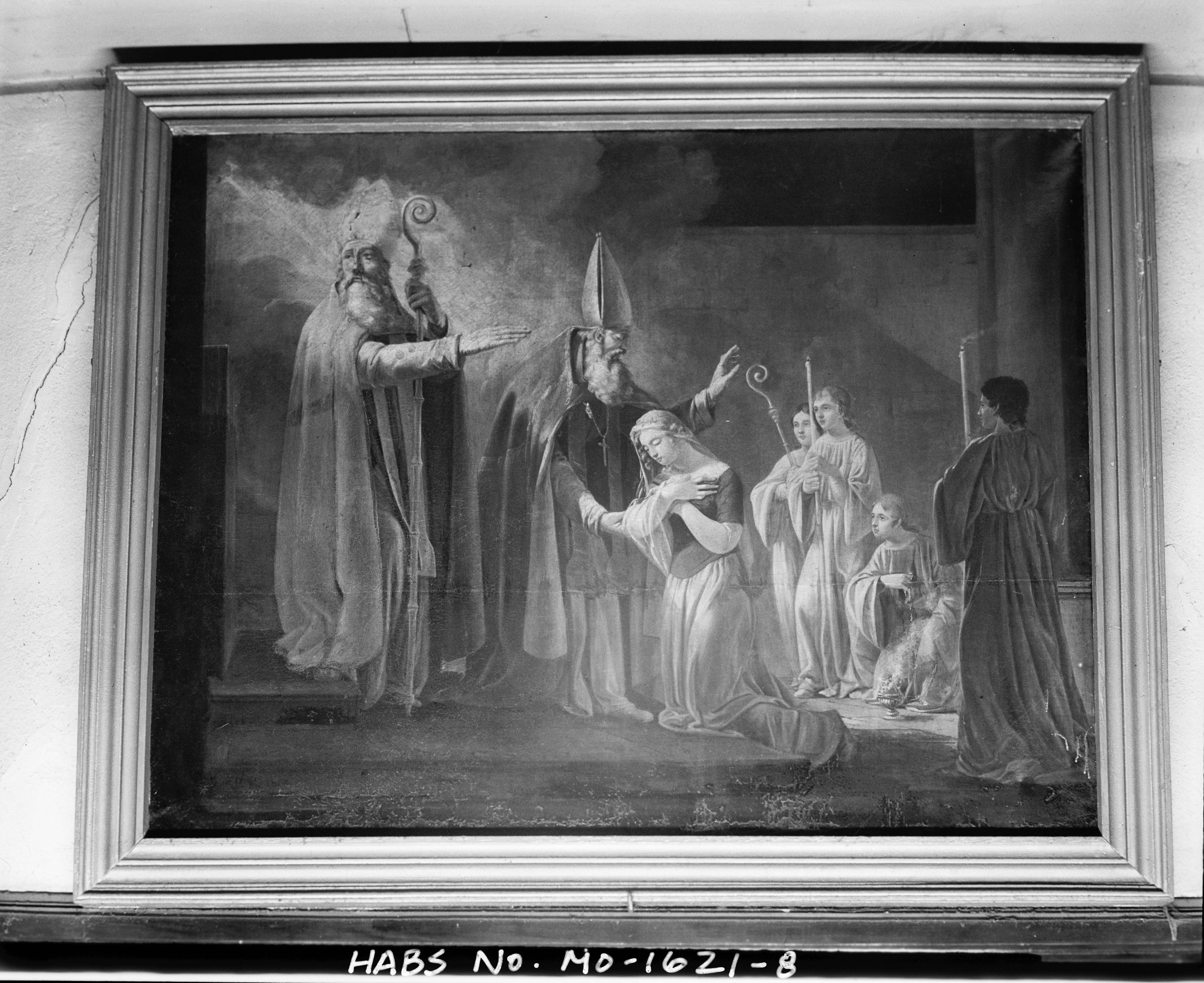
The Consecration of Ste. Genevieve; painting by M. Basterot in the Church of Ste. Geneviève, Missouri

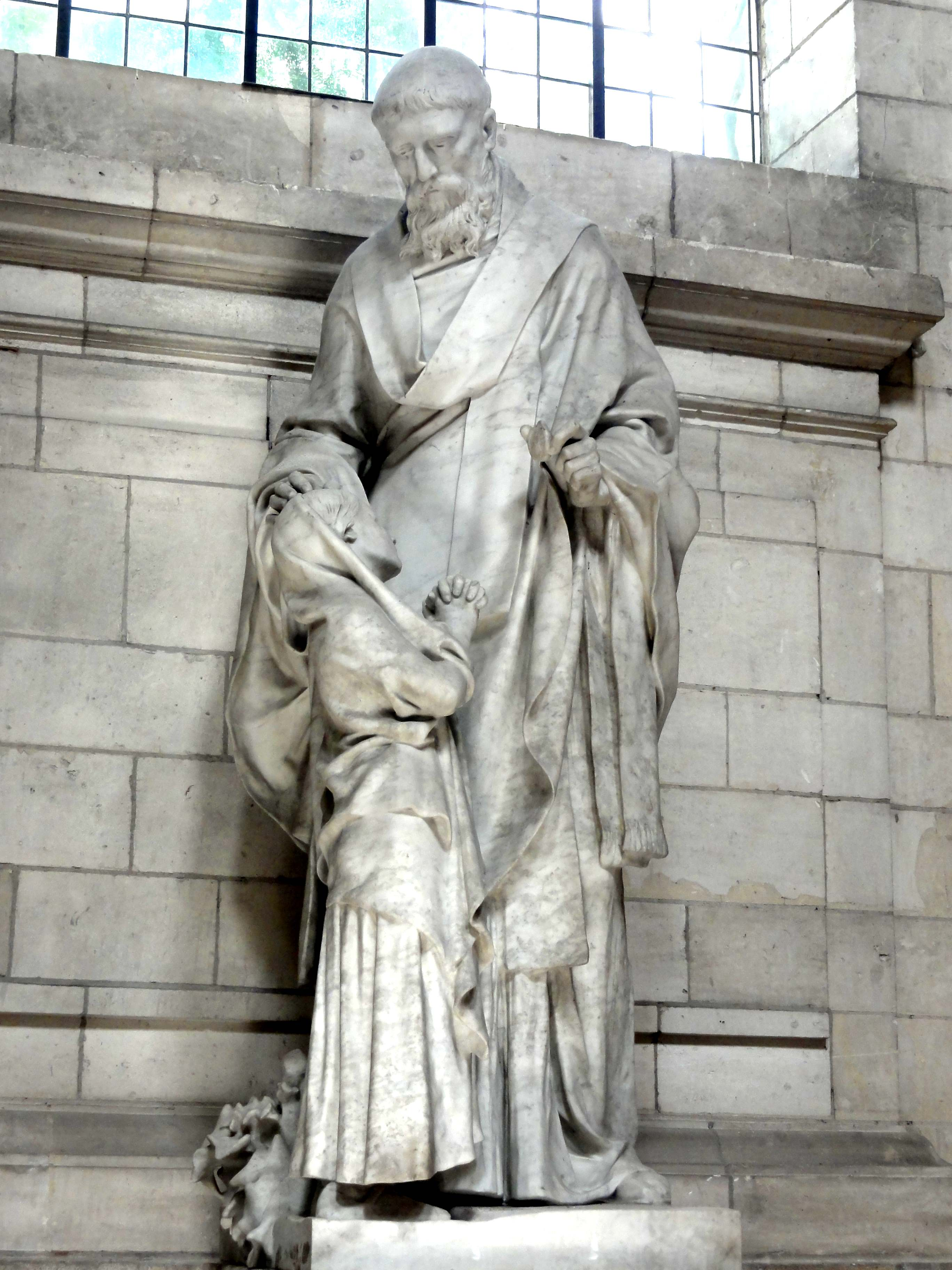
Genevieve, with Germanus of Auxerre, created by sculptor Henri Chapu (c. 1875)

According to the Catholic Encyclopedia, Germanus gave Genevieve a medal engraved with a cross and instructed her to wear it instead of pearls and gold jewelry to help her to remember her commitment to Christ. The Catholic Encyclopedia also states that since there were no convents near Nanterre, she "remained at home, leading an innocent, prayerful life"; according to historian Jo Ann McNamara, Germanus inspired Genevieve to dedicate her life and virginity to God's service, which was not limited to an established rule or a monastic lifestyle. It is unknown when Genevieve received the consecration of virgins; some sources state that she received her veil from Pope Gregory I, while others state that she, along with two companions, received them from the Bishop of Paris when she was 15 years old. Sluhovsky states that Genevieve was consecrated c. 437.

Genevieve's vita relates a story about her mother being struck blind after violently preventing Genevieve from attending church on a feast day. After almost two years, Genevieve realised that she was the reason for her mother's blindness; after her mother asked her to retrieve water for her from a nearby well, she restored her mother's sight with it. According to Sluhovsky, the miracle confirmed Genevieve's sanctity and her family later allowed her to be brought with two girls before a bishop to be consecrated as virgins. The bishop blessed her before the other girls, even though she was the youngest. Sluhovsky calls her mother's healing the first water-related miracle associated with Genevieve, who was invoked to protect Paris from floods centuries after her death. The Nanterre well was a popular site of veneration well into the 15th century. By the 16th century, many miracles occurred at the site, and it was one of the major pilgrimage sites in the Ile-de-France.

In the 1700s, an annual pilgrimage to Nanterre was celebrated on the first Sunday after Easter, and many of the well's visitors were members of the French royal family. For example, Anne of Austria had a "special devotion" to Genevieve and would make yearly pilgrimages on January 3, Genevieve's feast day, to the well in Nanterre to pray for the birth of a male heir. After Anne's son was born, she visited Nanterre to thank Genevieve and, in 1642, donated the cornerstone for a new seminary there. According to Sluhovsky, other fountains and springs were associated with Genevieve and were attributed with healing powers, including against high fevers, into the early modern period. In 1599, the Swiss physician and writer Thomas Platter recorded a possibly earlier water miracle: when Genevieve was still in school, a bridge appeared over a ditch filled with water, and then disappeared after she crossed it. Platter argued that this miracle was the reason the residents of Paris ascribed Genevieve the power to change the weather.

=== Later life and death ===
After her parents' deaths, Genevieve went to live with her godmother in Paris, devoting herself to prayer and charitable works. She became severely paralysed and almost died; after she recovered, she reported that she had seen visions of heaven. In Paris, she became admired for her piety and devotion to works of charity, and practiced fasting, "severe corporal austerities", and the mortification of the flesh, which included abstaining from meat and breaking her fast only twice a week. She fasted, between the ages of 15 and 50, from Sunday to Thursday and from Thursday to Sunday; her diet consisted of beans and barley bread, and she never drank alcohol. After she turned 50 and by order of her bishops, she added fish and milk to her diet. She devoutly kept vigil each Saturday night, "following the teaching of the Lord concerning the servant who awaited the master's return from a wedding".

Genevieve's neighbours, "filled with jealousy and envy", accused her in 445 or 446 of being a hypocrite and imposter, and that her visions and prophecies were frauds. Sluhovsky states that Genevieve "received the divine gift of reading people's thoughts", which displeased many residents of Paris. Sluhovsky also states that opposition to her occurred because she threatened the male hierarchy in Paris, so she needed patronage and recognition from established male authorities, which she received from Germanus, Simeon Stylites, and Clovis I. Her enemies plotted to drown her, but Germanus visited Paris again and defended her, although the attacks continued. The bishop of Paris appointed her to care for other consecrated virgins; "by her instruction and example she led them to a high degree of sanctity".

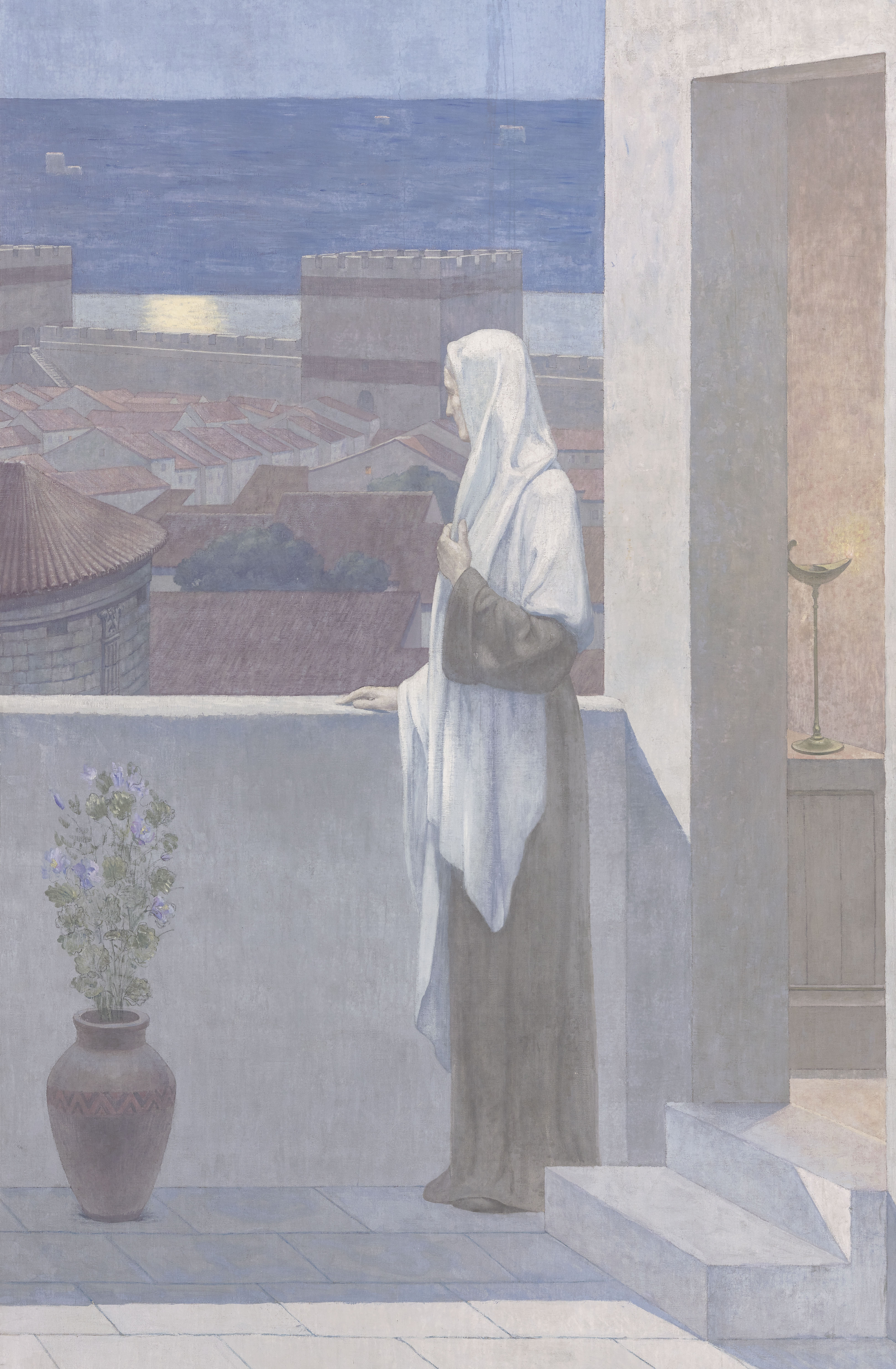
Section of "Sainte Geneviève Watching over Paris, by muralist Pierre Puvis de Chavannes (date unknown)

Shortly before the Huns' 451 attack of Paris, Genevieve prophesied that the city would be spared, but that those who fled Paris would be killed. Genevieve and Germanus's archdeacon persuaded the people of Paris that she "was not a prophetess of doom" and convinced the women that instead of joining their husbands and abandoning their homes, to pray and do acts of penance to spare the city. It is claimed that the intercession of Genevieve's prayers caused Attila's army to go to Orléans instead. According to her vita, Genevieve persuaded the women of Paris to undertake a series of fasts, prayers, and vigils "in order to ward off the threatening disaster, as Esther and Judith had done in the past". McNamara, who translated Genevieve's vita, calls it a "prayer marathon" and Genevieve's "most famous feat". Genevieve also persuaded the men to not remove their goods from Paris. The city's residents were again angered by her prophesies, and as Sluhovsky put it, "possibly by her disruption of gender hierarchies"; they again plotted to kill her, but she was saved by Germanus's intervention; a messenger was sent to bring her eucharistic loaves shortly after his death, which prevented the residents from carrying out their plan against Genevieve.

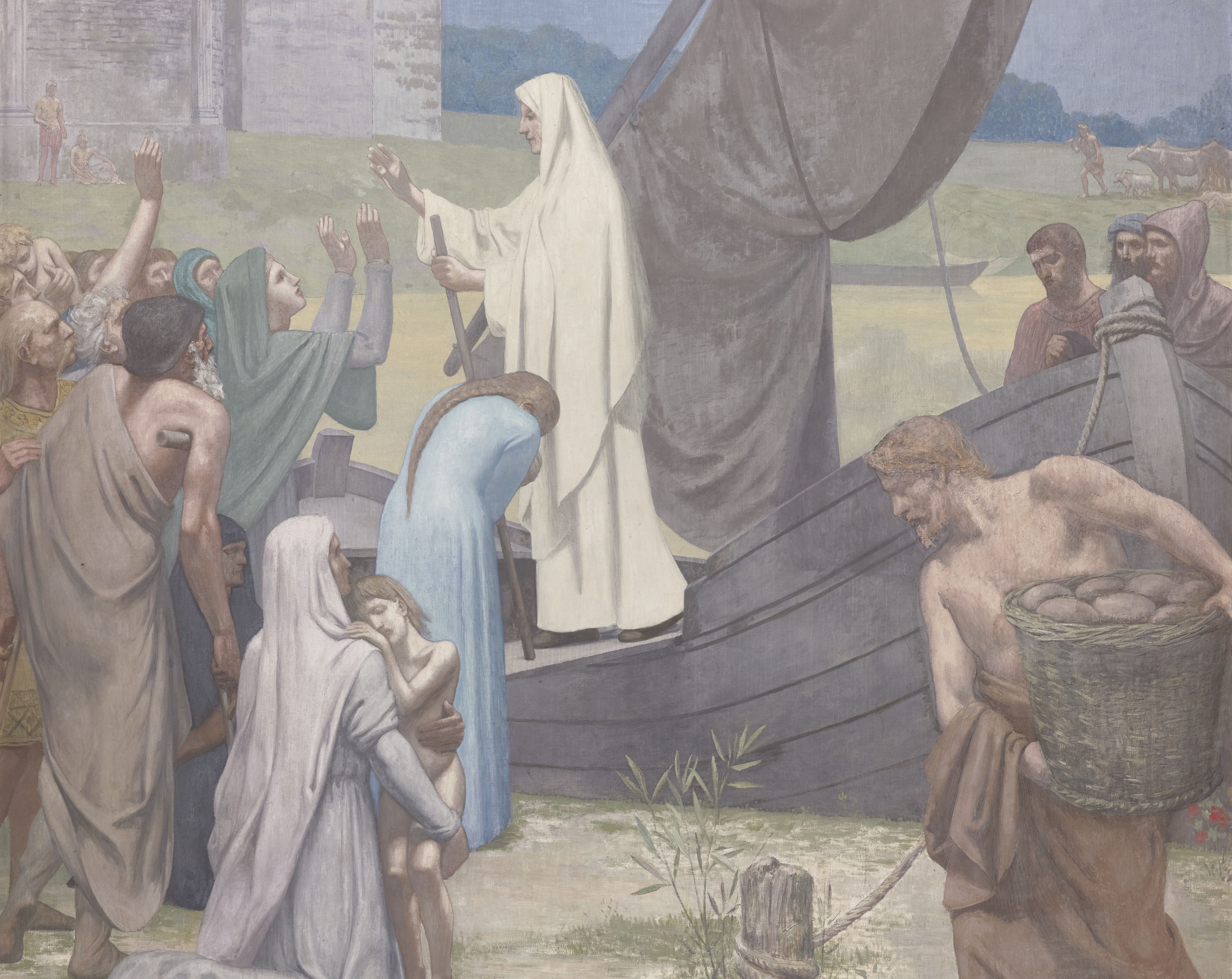
Section of "Saint Geneviève Resupplying Besieged Paris," by Pierre Puvis de Chavannes (c. 1890)

Years later, Genevieve "distinguished herself by her charity and self-sacrifice" during the defeat of Paris by Merowig in 480 and was able to influence him and his successors, Childeric and Clovis I, to be lenient towards the city's residents. According to Farmer, Genevieve made an agreement with soldiers during the siege of Paris to obtain provisions, which were transported by river from Arcis and Troyes. Her vita reports that Clovis, who venerated her, often pardoned criminals he had put in prison at Genevieve's request, even if they were guilty; Attawater states that Genevieve asked Clovis to free prisoners and be lenient to lawbreakers. According to Farmer, she "won Childeric's respect". He ordered the Paris gates closed so that Genevieve could not rescue prisoners he wanted to execute, but after Genevieve was informed of his plans, she opened the gates by touching them, without a key; she then met with Childeric and persuaded him not to execute the prisoners. She led a convoy, and "proved herself capable of leading a paramilitary operation which necessitated crossing enemy lines", through the blockade of Paris up the Seine from Troyes to bring food to the starving citizens. On her return home, Genevieve's prayers saved the eleven ships that carried her, her companions, and the grain for the residents of Paris. Back in Paris, she gave food to the poor first.

Genevieve was also involved in two major construction projects in Paris. She had a strong devotion to Saint Denis of Paris, the city's first bishop, and wanted to build a basilica in his honour in 475, even though the local priests had few resources. She told them to go to the bridge of Paris, where they found an abandoned lime kiln, which provided the building materials for the basilica. After praying all night, one of the priests promised to raise the funds needed to hire workers, and carpenters donated their time to gather wood and other resources. When the workers ran out of water to drink, Genevieve prayed and made the sign of the cross over a vessel, and water was miraculously provided. The basilica was later called the Priory of Saint Denis de Strata. Genevieve collaborated with Clothilde, the wife of Clovis I, to bring about his conversion to Christianity; shortly before her death, Genevieve convinced him to build the Basilica of the Holy Apostles, dedicated to Saint Peter and Saint Paul, which was completed after the year 500. After Genevieve's death, in recognition of her part in Clovis's conversion, Clothilde was able to honour her grave.

Genevieve's vita states that "she passed over in ripe old age, full of virtue"; she died at the age of 82. After her death, she was enshrined in the Basilica of the Holy Apostles, which she helped build. She was buried next to members of Clovis's family, and she was considered a protector of the royal family. Miracles started occurring at the basilica immediately following her internment there; her vita records the earliest ones. Her entombment at the basilica helped Genevieve gain prestige; soon after her death, her tomb became a pilgrimage site. Genevieve's vita states, about the basilica, "A triple portico adjoins the church, with pictures of Patriarchs and Prophets, Martyrs and Confessors to the faith in ancient times from pages of history books". Healings took place at her shrine after Genevieve's death; oil that was kept in the Abbey of Saint Genevieve, which was built early in the 6th century, was reported to heal blindness as late as the 9th century. Additional miracles experienced by pilgrims to her shrine were recorded in the 14th century. Similar to the miracles that occurred during Genevieve's lifetime, there were reports of miracles such as the healing of eye disease, paralysis, the plague, and high fever.

=== Miracles ===
According to McNamara, during the Franks' many sieges of Paris, Genevieve had to convince them "that she and her God were allies worth having". McNamara also states that Genevieve "aligned with the poor and the conquered against unharnessed secular power". McNamara believes, however, that her status as a woman with no official status or political power "rendered her innocuous in the context of secular power" and reports that Genevieve inspired the Franks to respect the Gallic saints and provided evidence to the rulers on both sides that God responded to her prayers. McNamara goes on to state, "Power, as expressed through miracles, protected Childeric and his successors from the possibility that whatever mercy and indulgence they showed towards the saints and to the poor they championed might be construed as a sign of weakness unbecoming a warrior". Sluhovsky states that miraculous healings, which included restoring sight to the blind, healing women of paralysis, and expelling demons from the possessed, occurred both during Genevieve's lifetime and after her death.

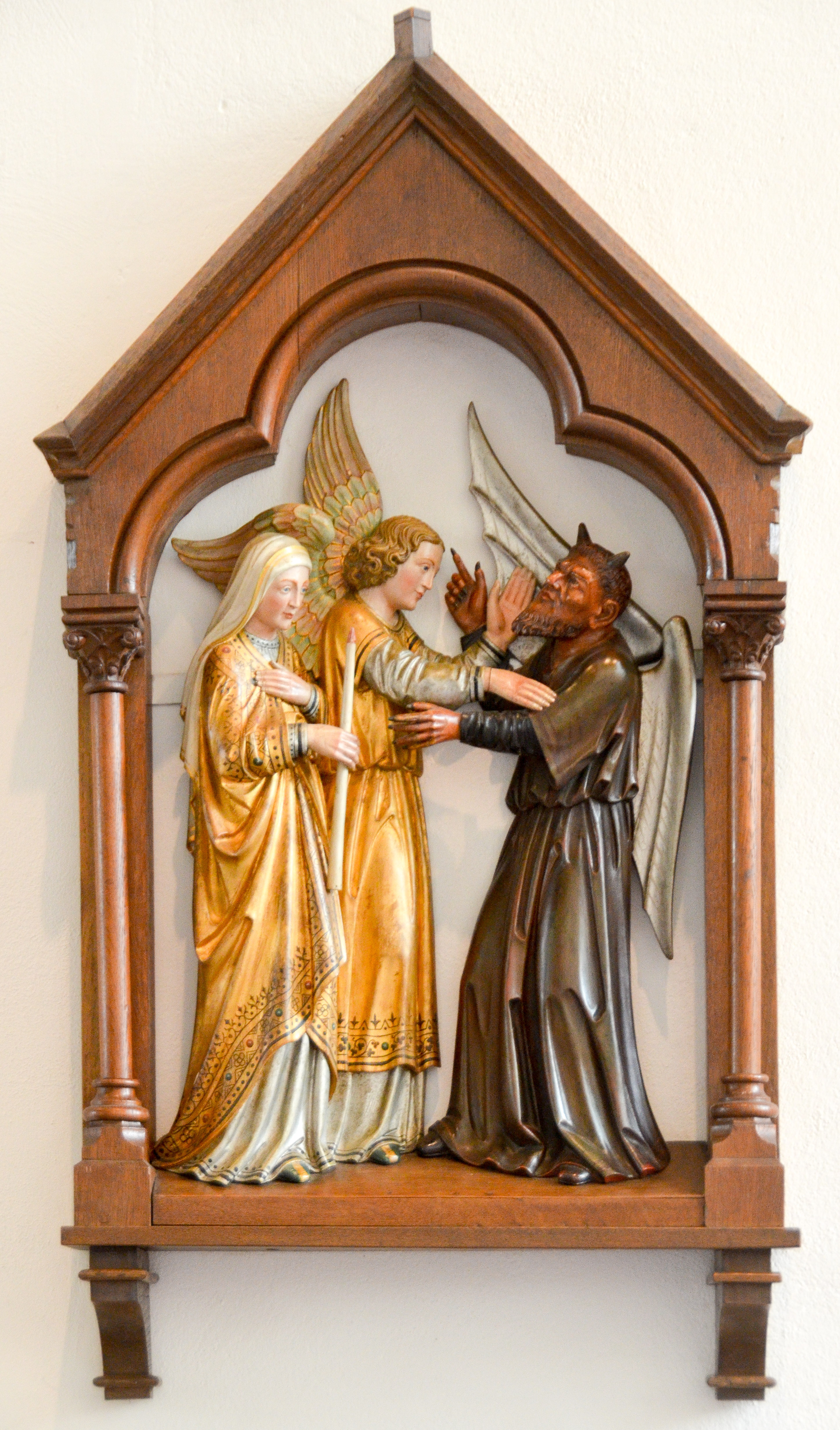
Miniature of Saint Genevieve (at St. Genoveva Church in the Netherlands), with an angel on her right and a demon on her left

According to the Catholic Encyclopedia, Genevieve had frequent visions of heavenly saints and angels. She also performed miracles in Paris and throughout the Ile-de-France, which included exorcising demons, healing the blind, resurrecting the dead, rescuing prisoners, and helping a consecrated virgin escape her fiancé. Genevieve's vita reports that she rekindled a candle after it went out on the way from her cell to the Basilica of Saint-Denis; the virgins with her were frightened, so she asked to hold the candle and it immediately lit up again. When she arrived at the basilica, the candle was consumed by its own fire and after completing her prayers, another candle was lit when she touched it, and people were healed when they procured fragments of her candle. Later stories about this event report that a demon was trying to extinguish the candle and that an angel protected her. According to Sluhovsky, the residents of Paris were familiar with this story because an angel, looking over her right shoulder, and a demon, looking over her left shoulder, were featured with her in the most common iconographic representations of Genevieve, including several late medieval and early modern drawings, miniatures, and engravings. The image also appeared in the earliest surviving statues and miniatures of her, including her statue at the Louvre, created in the 13th century, and a miniature at her abbey.

Genevieve's vita states that when a woman stole Genevieve's shoes, the woman was struck blind when she arrived at her home; someone led her back to Genevieve, who healed her after she asked for her forgiveness. Her vita also reports that Genevieve was able to discern that a young woman was lying about her chastity and that "she restored vision, strength, and life to various people". Genevieve also healed a nine-year-old girl who lived in Lyon and healed, by the laying on of her hands, a young girl who had not been able to walk for two years. Genevieve resurrected a four-year-old boy, the son of a woman she had healed of demon possession, who had fallen into a well and drowned. The boy was baptised on Easter and was subsequently called Cellomerus because he "had recovered his life in [Genevieve's] cell". Also during Easter, she healed a blind woman with prayers and with the sign of the cross. She healed a man from Meaux who had a withered hand and arm; she prayed for him, touched his arm and joints, and made the sign of the cross over him; he was restored to health in 30 minutes. She released twelve people who lived in Paris of demon possession; she ordered them to go to the Basilica of Saint-Denis and healed them after making the sign of the cross over each of them.

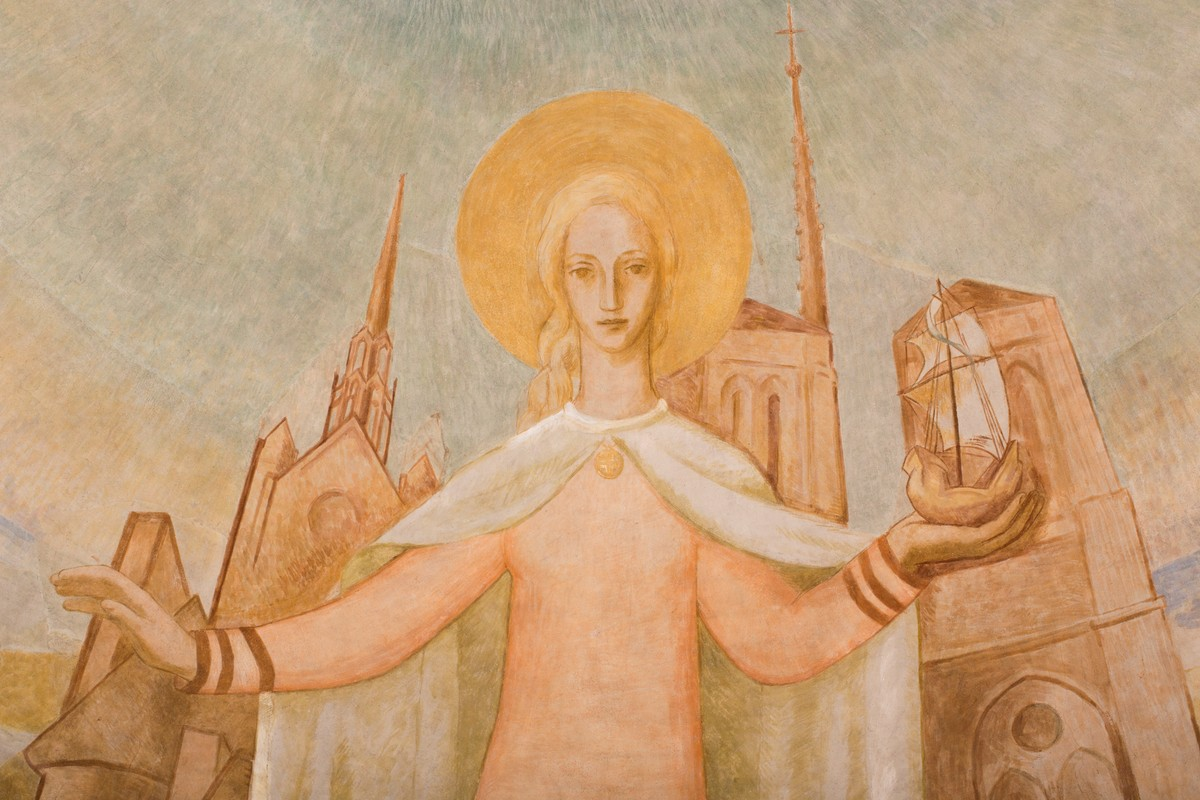
Section of image in Nanterre Cathedral depicting Saint Genevieve blessing Paris

Genevieve was asked to heal the wife of a tribune of paralysis, which was done with prayer and the sign of the cross. While in Troyes, many people were brought to her for healing, including a sick child who was healed after drinking water she had blessed, as well as a blind man, whom the writer of her vita reports had been punished for working on Sunday. Her vita also reports that many people, including those suffering from demon possession, had been healed after tearing off parts of her garments. She healed a city official, who had been deaf for four years, by touching his ears while making the sign of the cross over them. Her vita describes miracles that happened in Orléans through her intercessions, including raising the daughter of a family's matriarch from the dead and healing a man who became ill because he refused to forgive his servant. Genevieve then visited Tours, "braving many perils on the River Loure"; she was greeted there by a crowd of people possessed by demons, whom she healed, with prayers and the sign of the cross, in the Basilica of Saint Martin. Some victims reported that Genevieve's fingers "blazed up one by one with celestial fire" while healing them. She also healed three women of demon possession privately, in their homes, and at the request of their husbands. Genevieve's vita reports that in Tours, "everyone honoured her in her comings and goings". Her vita also reports that near Genevieve's home, she was able to spot and remove a demon from the opening of a water vessel.

The parents of a young boy brought their son to her, whom she healed of blindness, deafness, and paralysis by making the sign of the cross and rubbing oil on him. Her prayers protected a harvest near Meaux from a whirlwind during a rainstorm; neither the reapers nor the crops were touched by any water. Another time, while traveling by ship on the Seine, her prayers saved the ship; her vita makes the connection between this and the miracle of Christ calming the storm in the Gospels. Genevieve would often use oil to anoint and heal the sick. Her vita reports that on one occasion, she sent for a vessel with oil that was supposed to have been blessed by a bishop, but after she prayed for an hour, the vessel was miraculously filled with oil and she was able to heal someone from demon possession.

== Influence ==
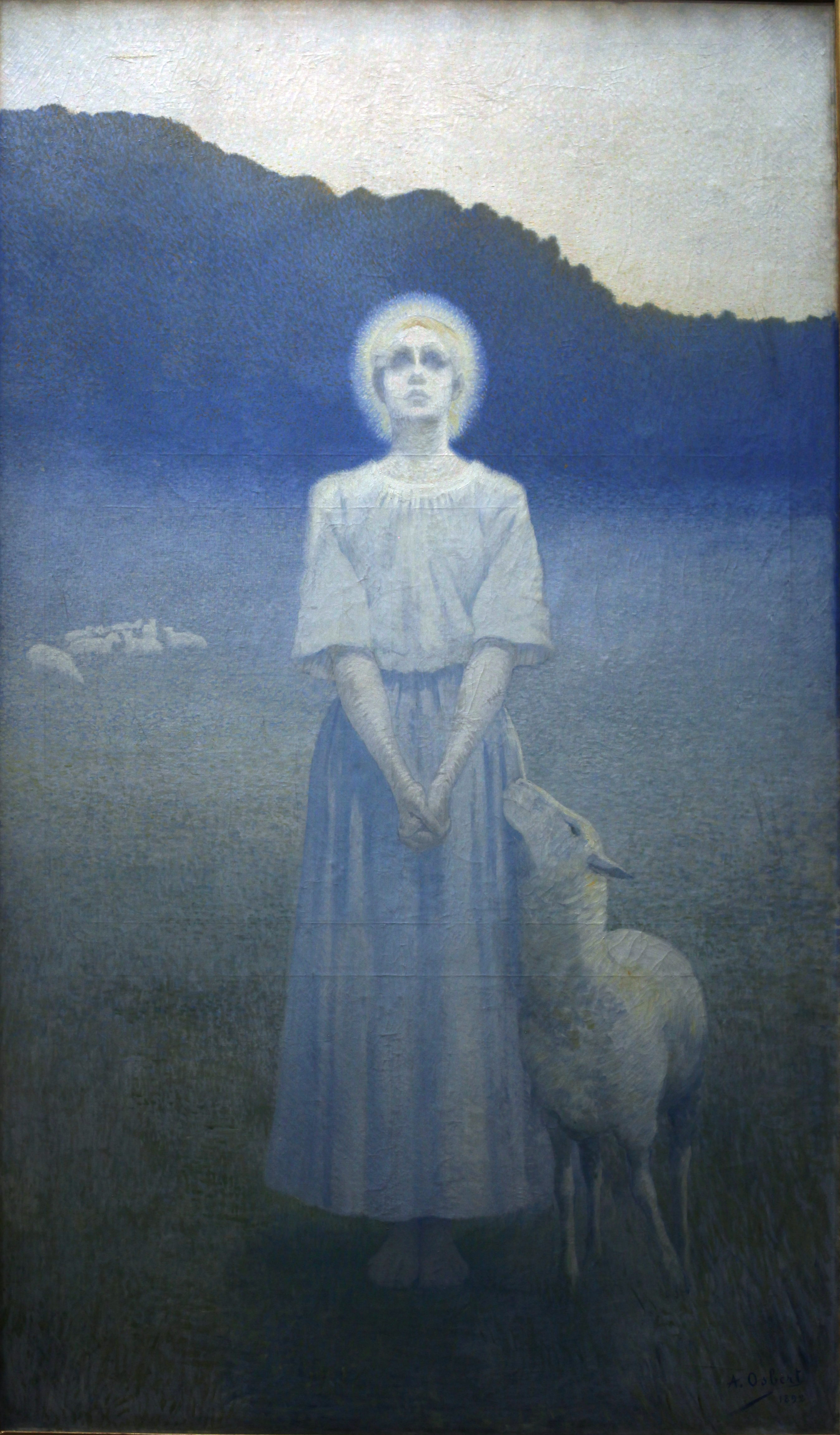
"Vision of Saint Genevieve" (1892) by Alphonse Osbert, which depicts Genevieve as a shepherdess

By the 14th century, Genevieve was recognized as the patron saint and a protector of Paris, which Sluhovsky finds remarkable because she was a woman. Sluhovsky called Genevieve's cult, which lasted over 1,000 years, "a success story" and said, "It was a process of expanding patronage—from monastery to neighbourhood, to city, to the entire kingdom. Throughout, however, the saint managed to maintain her intimate friendship with the people of Paris". According to Shuhovsky, "[Genevieve] became a favorite of both the humblest residents and of the Bourbon family, and was equally venerated by Erasmus and revolutionary fishwives". Sluhovsky considers Genevieve "a cultural symbol which Parisians shared, appropriated, negotiated, and used according to specific communal assumptions and traditions".

Complex images and attributions of Genevieve were created over a period of over 700 years, in liturgical writings, in editions of her Vita, in iconography, and in textual metaphors that were motivated by changing social, political, and religious conditions. Despite a wide variety of changes throughout the history of Paris and despite the numerous choices its residents had for possible intercessors, Genevieve was chosen as the city's patron saint. According to Sluhovsky, Genevieve successfully maintained her place in what he called "the hierarchy of the sacred in Paris" throughout the city's history. The placement of her shrine, for example, remained static, despite the changes that occurred throughout the city's history. Her public cult connected segments of French society and the urban and rural parts of France by bringing peasants into the city and by motivating urban residents to pray to her for successful crops and harvests outside Paris. Two churches in England, where five convents celebrated her feast, were dedicated to her during the Middle Ages, and her cult also spread to Southwest Germany.

=== Invocations and processions ===
Genevieve was publicly invoked during emergencies related to the needs and expectations of the residents of Paris 153 times between 885 and October 1791. They ranged from spontaneous and less-ritualized invocations and processions with her reliquary during the Middle Ages to highly ritualized ones said before her unveiled reliquary in the years leading up to the French Revolution. The reasons for the invocations also changed, from protection against floods to prayers for military victories, against a variety of meteorological occurrences, and for a steady food supply into Paris. Over 70 emergency invocations of Genevieve were processions with her reliquary from her shrine to Notre-Dame Cathedral. By the 18th century, the public rituals invoking Genevieve "were motivated not so much by concern for the well-being of the city at large, but for the well-being of the royal family".

Genevieve's relics were involved in 120 public invocations between 1500 and 1793, with over one-third occurring during the 18th century, which art historian Hannah Williams found surprising because "superstitious spirituality, with miracle-working objects and cults of saints, sits uneasily with our idea of the eighteenth century as the 'age of reason'". As Williams states, Genevieve's relics were "intimately tied to the city's history" and were called upon by the residents of Paris during times of crisis, "their faith rewarded with Saint Geneviève's long and impressive record of miracles". In 2016, Williams conducted an art-historical study of Genevieve's miracles, following four objects—her relics, two paintings, and Saint Genevieve's Church—across four events in the history of Paris, in order to demonstrate how their "use, reuse, transformations and appropriations reveal not religious decline, but shifting devotional practices and changing relationships with religious ideas and institutions" in Paris and throughout France. Williams also sought to demonstrate, using Genevieve's objects, the inseparability of religion from 18th-century Paris life.

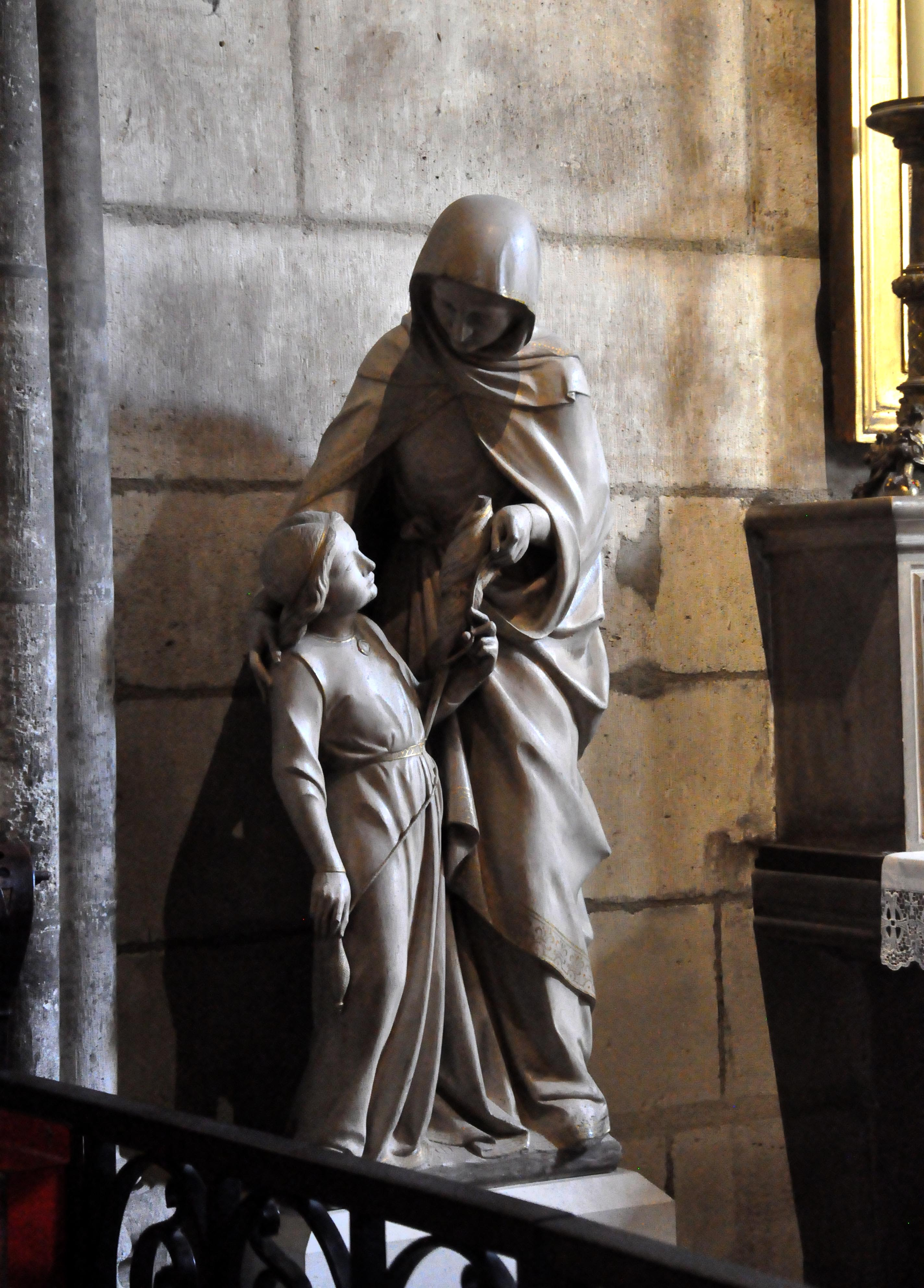
Statue of Saint Genevieve inside Notre-Dame Cathedral

Sluhovsky states that as times changed in Paris, the way in which she was invoked also changed. As new calamities threatened the city and new intercessions to her were needed, new readings of her vita provided the associations, images, and metaphors required. As Sluhovsky says, "Geneviève was remade to fit new expectations". Sluhovsky also states that Genevieve remained relevant for her followers because "she was made and remade by them" and because her roles, which changed throughout the centuries, were designed with different meanings, functions, and attributes. For example, Sluhovsky reports that the French government controlled and used Genevieve's relics for religio-political purposes, invoking her intervention in wars and sieges throughout the 14th and 15th centuries. Her image was changed into a military protector of France and "a warrior in the service of Paris", but points out that this change did not replace other images of Genevieve, but was "one of the extension of [her] roles".

Scholar Maria Warner states that Genevieve "benefited from the extension of taxonomy of female types" like Joan of Arc; Sluhovsky adds that it was part of the new image of the female warrior that connected her with contemporary concerns, which increased in popularity during the 16th century, when "France was preoccupied with military affairs". This preoccupation included, during the 16th century, 17 public rituals "to implore God for the victory of the Catholic Church" over Protestantism and the successful military operations associated with it. Sluhovsky states that Genevieve's image as a warrior and protector occurred at the same time when women like Catherine de' Medici and Anne of Austria gained more political power in France. Although Genevieve was attributed with male qualities that were usually given to bishops and military leaders, the residents of Paris were aware of the fact that their patron saint was a woman. For example, her reliquary and relics were not allowed to leave her shrine unless they were accompanied, escorted, and protected by a male, Saint Marcel. Her works and miracles, such as food supply and charitable works, were associated with feminine activities. Anne of Austria invoked Genevieve for her fertility, and most of her followers were women.

=== Artistic representations ===
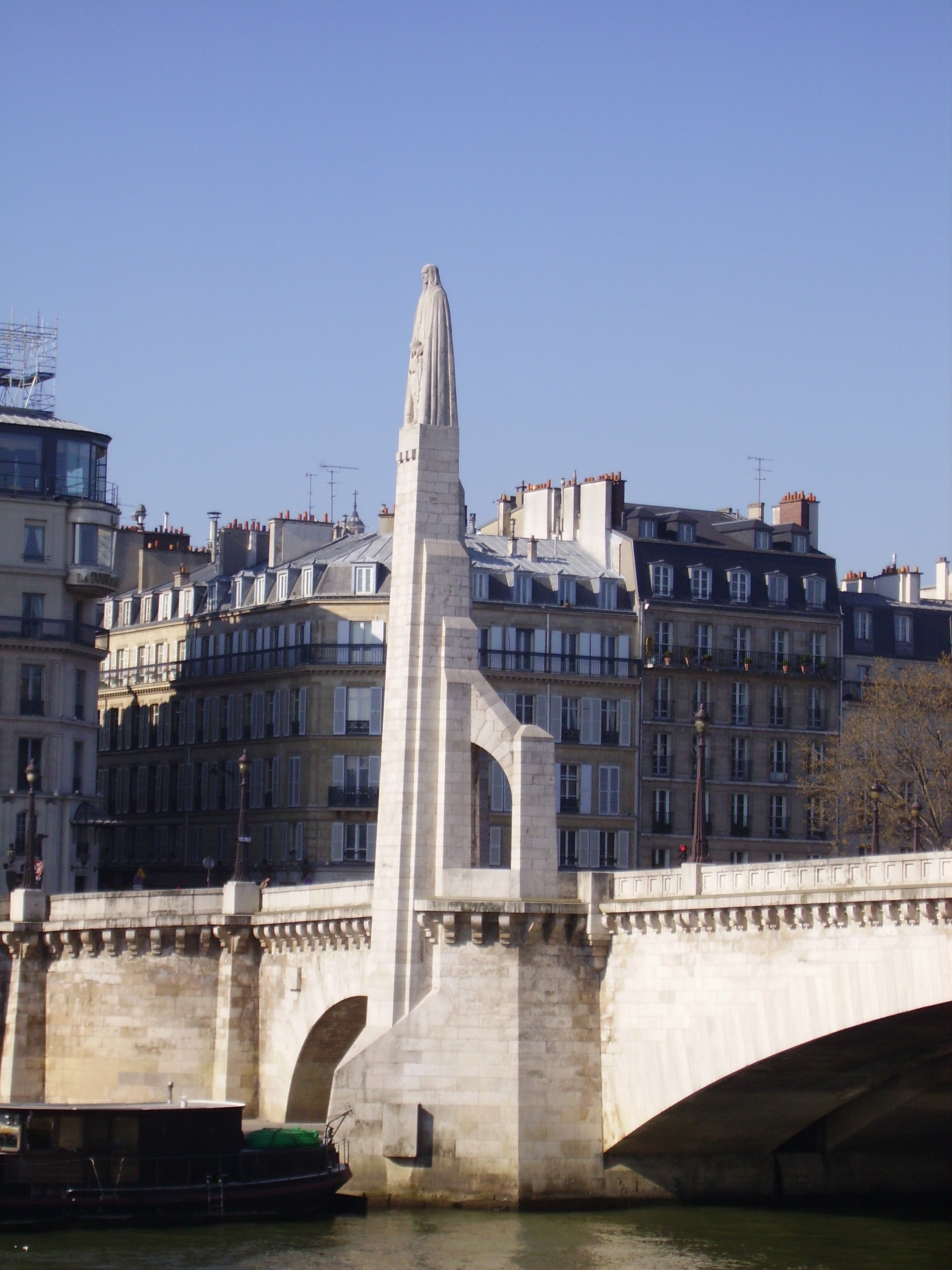
Statue of Genevieve at the Pont de la Tournelle, by Paul Landowski

The most notable artistic representations of Genevieve, which continued traditions from the late Middle Ages, were created between the 17th and 19th centuries, including the frescoes of Pierre Puvis de Chavannes in the Panthéon. Several iconographic images depicting Genevieve's water-based miracles were created during the Middle Ages, including a small bas-relief as part of her effigy in the portal of Notre-Dame, which also depicted the well in Navarre where Genevieve retrieved the water that healed her mother. A statue in the Abbey of Saint Genevieve, in the shape of a fountain, depicted her holding a candle with water flowing from the tip. Another small statue, erected inside the abbey's shrine, near the altar, depicted her with the emblem of Paris at her feet, and holding a key to heaven and a sceptre.

Genevieve is portrayed protecting Paris from a flood in a Parisian Book of Hours published in the late 1400s, and her image as a fountain is included in hymnals also published in the 1400s. In the early 1400s, a mystery play was composed by her canon called the Miracles De Sainte Genevieve; it related 14 episodes in her life, including her defence of Paris, and compared her to Joan of Arc. In 1512, the poet Pierre du Pont wrote a votive poem in honour of Genevieve, which was dedicated to Phillippe Cousin, who was the abbot of Saint Genevieve Abbey. It was the first work to portray Genevieve as a shepherdess, like Joan of Arc, which, even though it contradicted Genevieve's family history and was historically inaccurate, became immediately popular in her literary and iconographic depictions. Other images created at the end of the 1600s include a large-sized painting of Genevieve, which portrayed her surrounded by a flock of sheep, and an engraving by Léonard Gaultier, which included traditional medieval images of her, as well as the newer image of her as a shepherdess and warrior. By the mid-1600s, the image of Genevieve as a shepherdess also appeared in the Catholic liturgy. In 1652, a book of hymns dedicated to Genevieve was published by Antoine Godeau, a poet and the bishop of Venice, that invoked water-based images, metaphors, and associations connected with Genevieve. In 1913, the early 20th-century writer, Charles Péguy, wrote a series of poems referring to 15th-century French saint Joan of Arc as a reincarnation of Genevieve . French sculptor Paul Landowski created a statue of Genevieve in 1928, which honoured her protection of Paris during World War I, at the Pont de la Tournelle.

=== Early Middle Ages ===
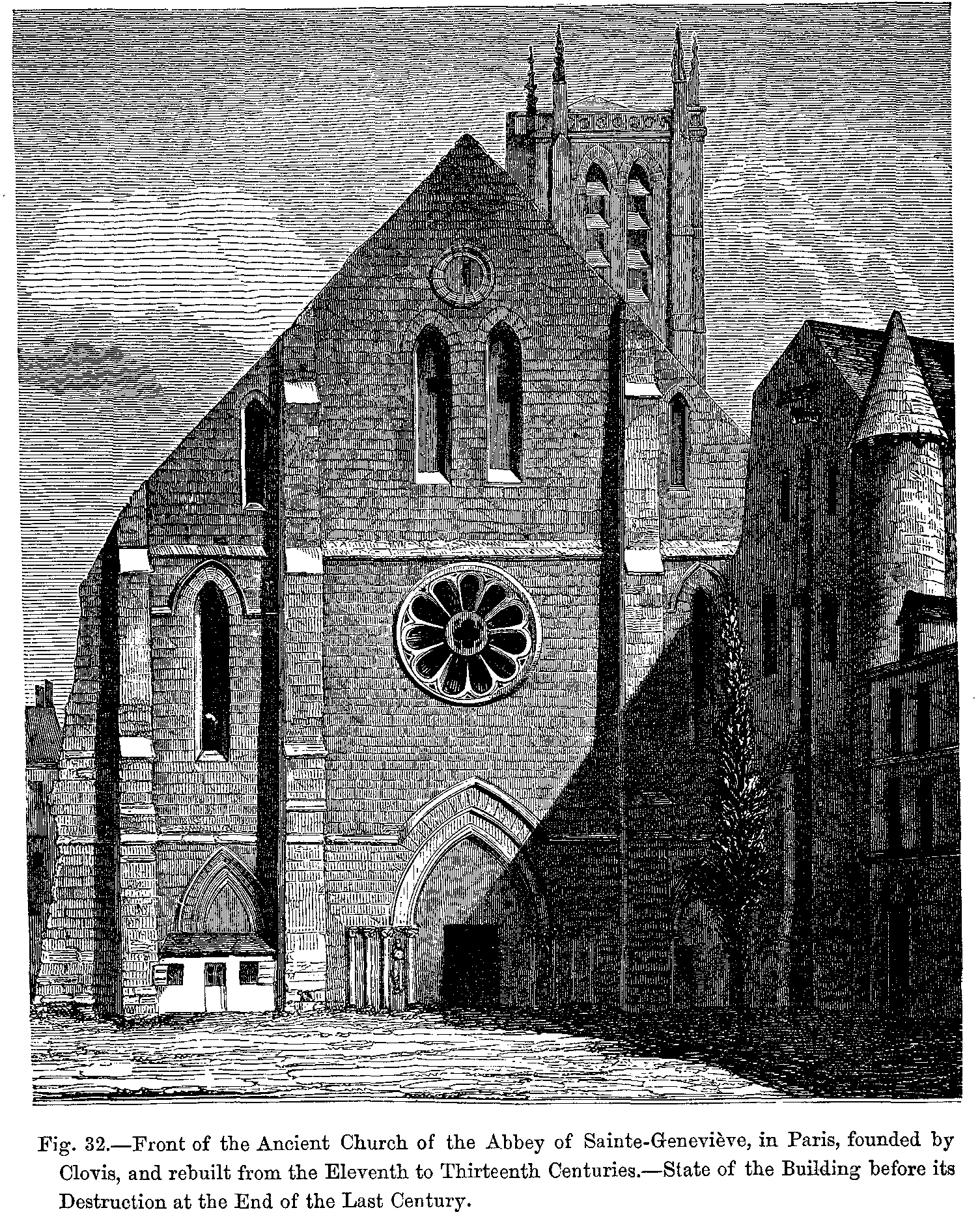
Front of the Church of the Abbey of Saint Genevieve, in a 19th-century engraving

Many of Genevieve's activities during the Middle Ages were similar to those of contemporary Gallo-Roman bishops. For example, the author of her vita compares her to Martin of Tours, who saved Worms, and Aignan of Orléans, who organised the defense of Orléans, also like Genevieve, against the Huns. She has also been compared to Leo I, who rescued Rome from Attila the same year that she diverted Attila from Paris. She also participated in the consolidation of Clovis's power and in the defeat of Arianism, and her active life in Paris occurred at the same time the city's influence was increasing. Like other female saints, she "had to assume male characteristics in order to gain influence and to resolve the contradictions between her gender and her prominence". In her vita, Germanus advised Genevieve to "act manfully", and she was compared to Judith and Esther, Biblical figures who also crossed gender boundaries.

By the eighth century, a hospice for pilgrims was built next to the Basilica of the Holy Apostles; by the ninth century, the basilica was known as Saint Genevieve's Abbey. A small canon was formed, and a small abbey was built in Genevieve's honour in the early 800s. The community was forced to flee during the Siege of Paris in 845; they brought Genevieve's reliquary with them and hid them in Athis, Draveil, and Marizy, although they were returned to Paris in 862. According to Sluhovsky, miracles occurred at all three sites and increased her fame throughout the Île-de-France. In 885, the residents of Paris invoked the intercession of Genevieve and other saints when Paris was besieged by the Normans; she was credited with the city's success in repelling them. Sluhovsky states that it "affirmed her role as a divine intercessor". It was also the first time that she was invocated for the city as a whole, not just for individuals who visited her shrine, and established a tradition of public invocations of Genevieve. According to Sluhovsky, the later 800s to the eleventh century was a time of rebuilding after the destruction of the abbey by the Normans, but it was also a time of growing popularity for Genevieve. Liturgical texts and hymns were written in her honor during this period.

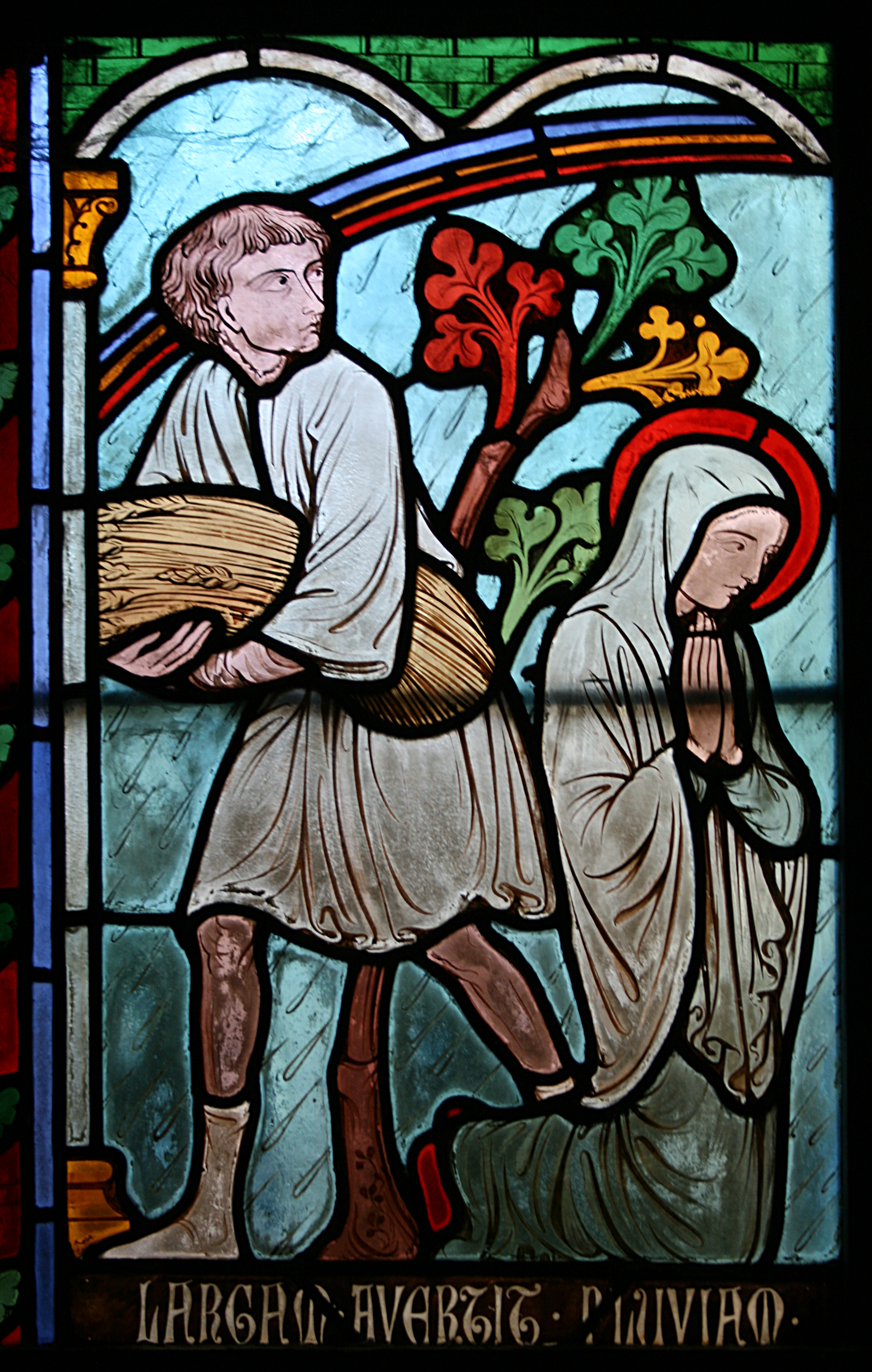
Saint Genevieve praying to stop the rain during the harvest (stained glass window Notre-Dame de Paris, made in the 19th century by Alfred Gérente)

In the winter of 834, heavy rains deluged Paris; the city's bishop encouraged the residents to fast and do penance. The only dry church where prayers could be conducted was Genevieve's abbey, where the only dry area was the floor around her deathbed, which was kept in the abbey. The waters of the Seine receded immediately. The miracle was compared to Moses's parting of the Red Sea in the Bible and her reliquary was compared to the Ark of the Covenant, which, according to Sluhovsky, authenticated Genevieve's power. Sluhovsky states that Genevieve's connection with water-related miracles, images, and objects were established after the invocations to her interventions were successful and were "not self-evident, but rather a result of a culminative process of successful miracles ... and propagation of the saint's role by her guardians". Most of the sources that document Genevieve's water-based miracles and interventions were composed and complied at her abbey, during a period in which water disasters most threatened Paris. Historian Anne Lombard-Jourdan states that Genevieve was substituted for and assigned the attributes of Leucothea, the Greek marine goddess whose name might be the origin of the name of Paris.

In 997, Robert I of France donated a new altar to the basilica and Genevieve's reliquary was moved from the crypt to the new altar. Robert the Pius became the basilica's patron in exchange for their prayers for him and for the stability of France, an arrangement that was renewed under Henry I and Louis VI. At first, the members of St. Genevieve's abbey followed the Rule of Chrodegang, which emphasized living in community, although cloistering and poverty were not mandatory, and obedience to the rule was lax; for example, her secular canons were able to keep the funds they received. The community was reformed by Pope Eugene II beginning in 1147.

=== High Middle Ages ===
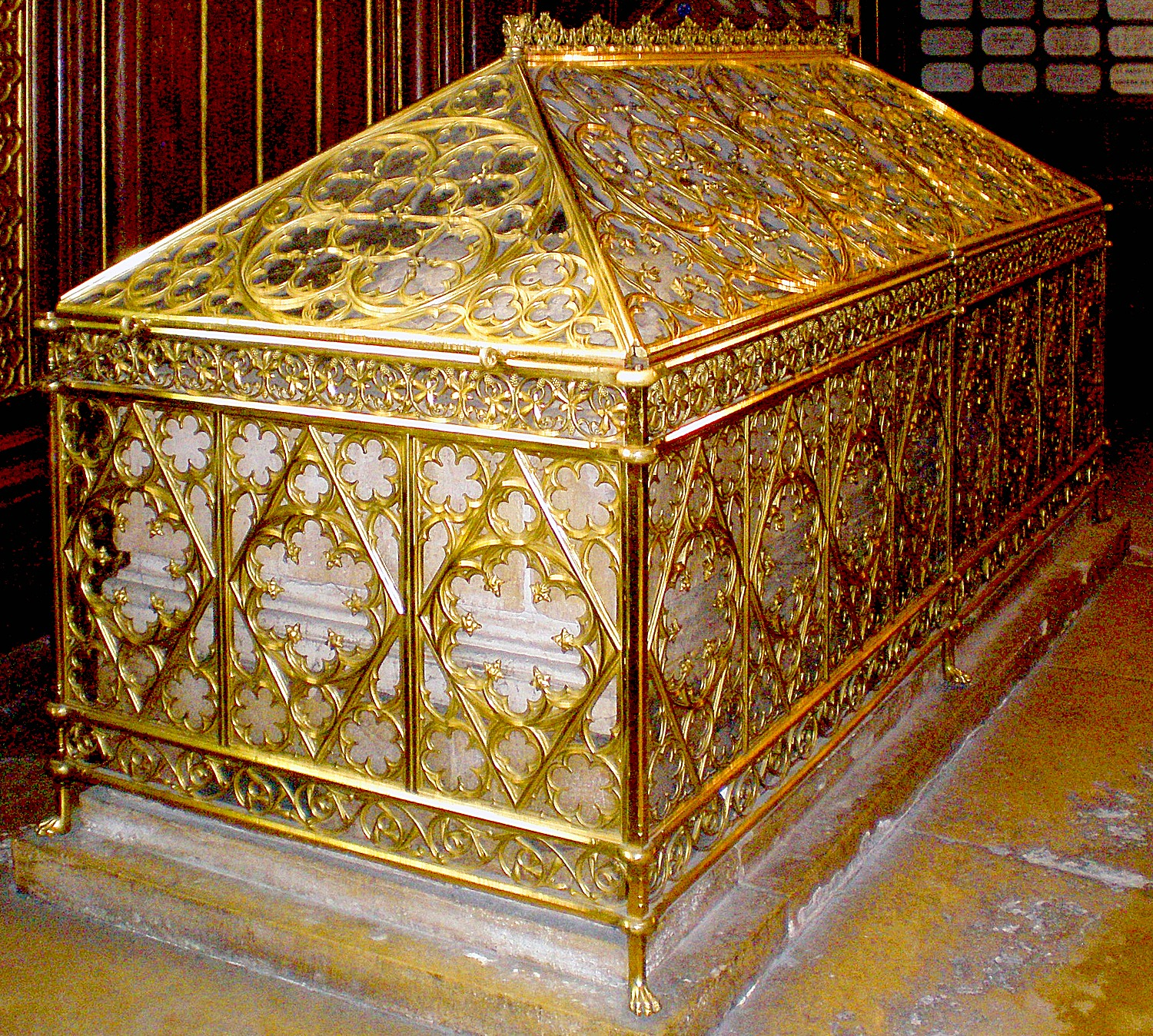
Reliquary for the surviving relics of Saint Genevieve at the Saint-Étienne-du-Mont (19th century)

Genevieve was called one of the most venerated saints of the early eleventh century. As Farmer states, Genevieve's shrine "was carried in procession in times of disaster" during the Middle Ages and the citizens of Paris have "invoked her in times of national crisis" many times. In 1129, during an epidemic of ergot poisoning, which Farmer called her most famous cure, was stayed after Genevieve's relics were carried in a public procession from her reliquary to Notre-Dame Cathedral. The city's bishop called for the procession only after everything else had been tried, including prayers to the Virgin Mary. Genevieve's prestige increased, and a third feast day honouring her was set at November 26, in a special liturgy celebrated by the entire country. All but three of the ill who gathered at the cathedral were healed. According to Sluhovsky, this was the first time a procession with Genevieve's reliquary took place. By the late 15th century and until 1993, the event was commemorated annually in the churches in Paris. According to Sluhovsky, the procession was "purely clerical" and served to connect St. Genevieve's Abbey and Notre-Dame. In the early 1130s, a rumour was circulated that Genevieve's head "was no longer attached to her body and was no longer in the possession of her abbey", which would have threatened both the religious and secular authority of the abbey and basilica. After an examination was conducted on January 10 by order of Louis VII, the rumour was disproven, and the date was established as the feast day of the Revelation of Genevieve's reliquary. At the end of the twelfth century, Genevieve's basilica was rebuilt by Danish nobles to compensate for its destruction by their ancestors.

In December 1206, Genevieve was called upon to protect the city from a flood; another procession was organised, and her relics were, as in 1129-1130, paraded into Paris, and relics from other churches were escorted with hers. Her body was brought from the abbey to Notre-Dame, a Mass was said, and then she was returned to the abbey. The Seine receded, and even though the relics and the participants in the procession crossed the Petit Pont twice and the bridge's foundations were weakened from the threatening flood waters, it did not collapse until the reliquary was returned and no one was injured. According to Sluhovsky, by the second half of the 1200s and continuing into the early 16th century, a tradition of invoking Genevieve to protect Paris from floods was established, often as a last resort, when the prayers to other saints were ineffective.

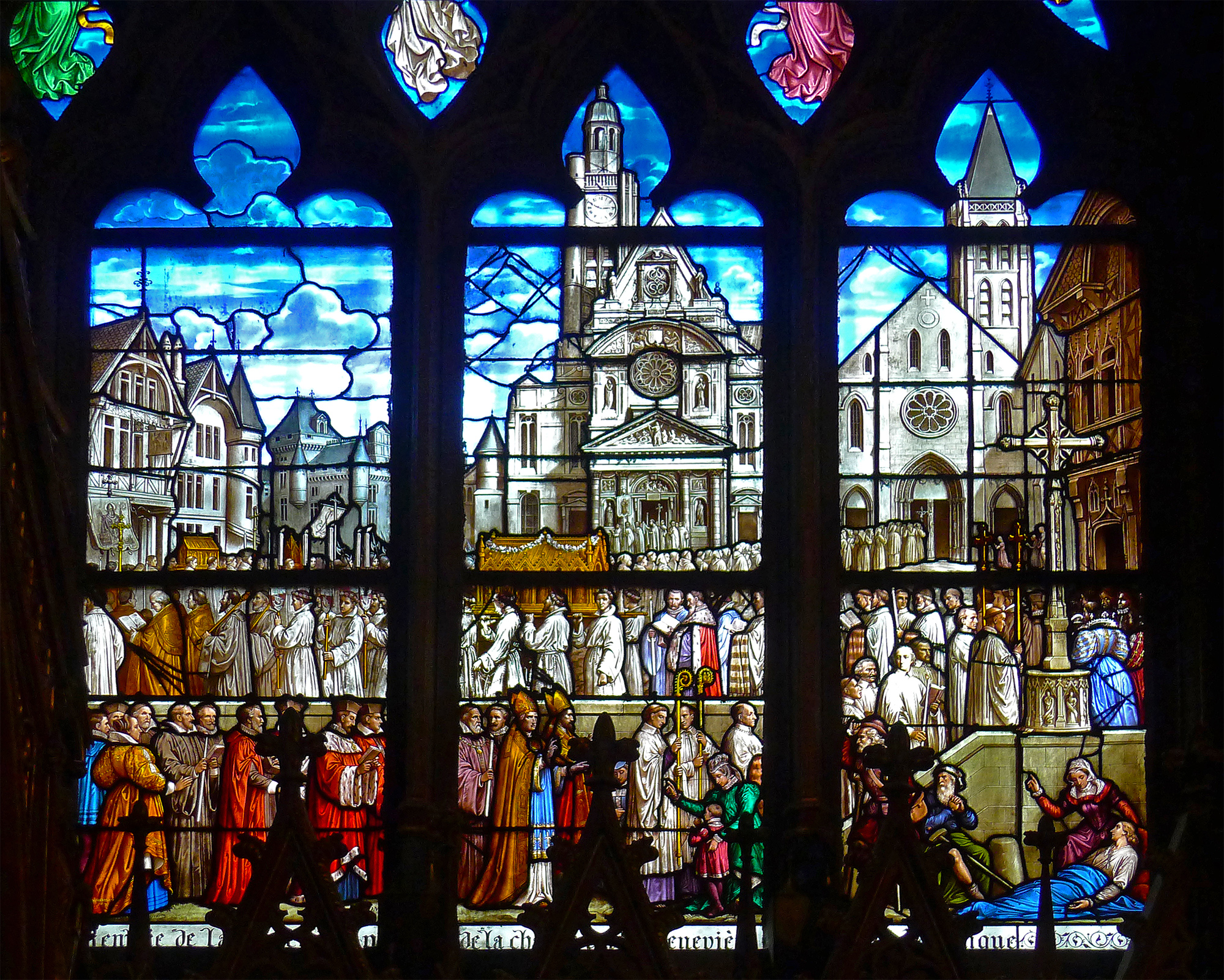
Stained glass window at Saint-Étienne-du-Mont Church in Paris, depicting a procession of Genevieve's shrine. Created by Adolphe Didron, 1882.

Genevieve's prestige, along with the power and prosperity of her community, increased through the Middle Ages. Processions were conducted annually throughout the High Middle Ages, four times per year: 3 January, her feast day; the third Sunday in Lent; on Palm Sunday; and on the Eve of the Ascension. Like most processions of the time, the processions started at Notre-Dame and ended at the appropriate religious sites, in this case, at Saint Genevieve's Abbey. One of the yearly processions conducted in Genevieve's honor occurred on the final day of the Rogation Days, an important three-day procession during the harvest season. The procession ended at St. Genevieve's Abbey and connected Genevieve to Marcel of France, another saint who had saved Paris from both a dragon and from agricultural ruin. Its purpose was both agricultural and geographical, blessing the harvest and the urban space of Paris. The procession that occurred on Genevieve's feast day was reserved only for clerics of her abbey and of Notre-Dame, without the participation of the laity, unlike most processions of the time. In 1447, Guillaume Chartier, the bishop of Paris, declared January 3 a public holiday; it was later approved by the Parliament of Paris, and Genevieve was honoured in all churches in Paris.

Genevieve's abbey was fortified and included within the city's new walls in 1210, and a new parish church, the Saint-Étienne-du-Mont, was constructed nearby. Rental fees were paid to the abbey by its parishioners, which increased the abbey's power and financial success. A new reliquary was built at the Étienne church beginning in 1230, and Genevieve's bones were translated there in 1242, the anniversary of her first translation during the first Norman attack of Paris. Genevieve was not the only saint who had lived in Paris and who was invoked with rituals and processions, but as Sluhovsky states, "from the twelfth century on she acquired a unique position among Parisian saints".

=== Late Middle Ages ===
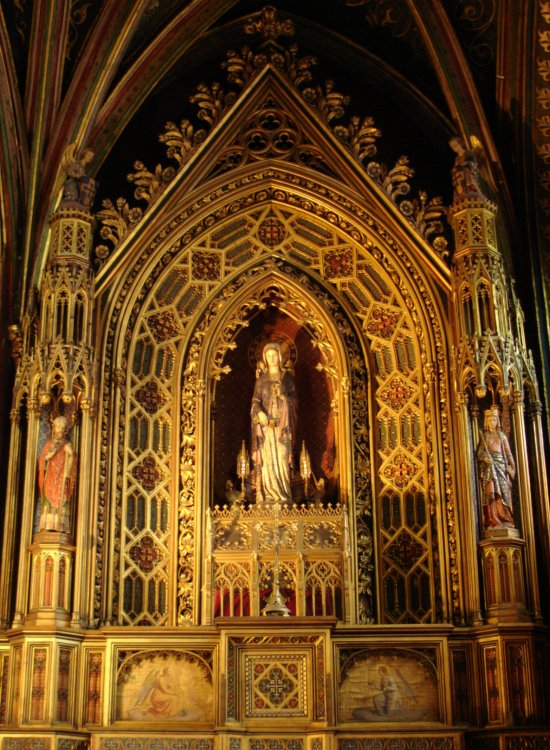
Shrine in the Chapel of Saint Genevieve at the Saint-Étienne-du-Mont

In 1303, the earliest known confraternity in Genevieve's honour was formed in the Church of the Holy Innocents in Paris. Other confraternities and occupational and devotional groups were founded in Nanterre during the early modern period. In the 17th century, two confraternities existed in the Saint-Étienne-du-Mont; the second one included both men and women and had over 400 members between 1605 and 1640. Genevieve was also honoured in parishes throughout France. In 1412, King Charles VI approved the establishment of the Confraternity of the Bearers of the Reliquary of Saint Genevieve, perhaps as a way to consolidate his support in Paris and in the 1400s, a Ceremonial of Saint Genevieve, one of the oldest documents of its type, was published. It was a compilation of descriptions and instructions of all liturgical and semi-liturgical events conducted in the Abbey of St. Genevieve.

In 1525, a lay confraternity, established at Saint Genevieve's Abbey in 1412, obtained permission from the convent's abbot to share with its canons the ability to carry Genevieve's reliquary during public processions. As a result, the confraternity changed its name to the Company of the Bearers of the Reliquary of Sainte Geneviève, and processions became its most important task. By 1545, Genevieve's canons gave up their rights to carry her reliquary, for unclear reasons, and only the lay members of her confraternities did so. According to Sluhovsky, who called it a "laicization" of the ritual, the change happened at the same time that Genevieve's invocations were becoming major civic ceremonies. Also according to Sluhovsky, who describes the regulations and practices of the Company of the Bearers of Reliquary of Sainte Geneviève up until the 18th century, members had to financially support its activities, including payments to the abbey for its clerics to perform Masses for them. As of the late 20th century, the Company was still in existence in Paris and continued to carry Genevieve's reliquary in an annual procession held during her octave. The processions, conducted by the elderly male members and assisted by the female members, occurred inside the Church of Saint-Étienne-du-Mont, where a small reliquary that was created during the 19th century, after the larger one was destroyed during the French Revolution, and which still exists.

=== 16th century ===
Beginning in 1535 and through 1652, appeals to Genevieve "were always highly politicized" and included attempts to both impose and oppose royal authority. On January 21, 1535, Genevieve's reliquary took part in "a major supplicatory procession" to invoke God against the Protestants in France. It was one of the largest and most spectacular religious processions that occurred in Paris and was ordered by King Francis I. According to Sluhovsky, the reliquary of Genevieve, the Eucharist, and the king's presence symbolised the urban, the Catholic, and the national identities of the French, all of which "joined together to undo the harm of fragmentation and discord, symbolised by Protestantism". Sluhovsky also states that the procession presented new relationships between the identities and symbols, as demonstrated in the new route of the procession, which started at Notre-Dame, paused at the royal church of Saint-Germain-l'Auxerrois near the Louvre, and ended back at Notre-Dame. It was the first time a procession marched in the commercial section of the Paris, connecting the royal church, the royal palace of the Louvre, and Notre-Dame; it was the first time that Genevieve's reliquary crossed the Seine to the Right Bank and made a statement that the city's unity depended upon royal authority.

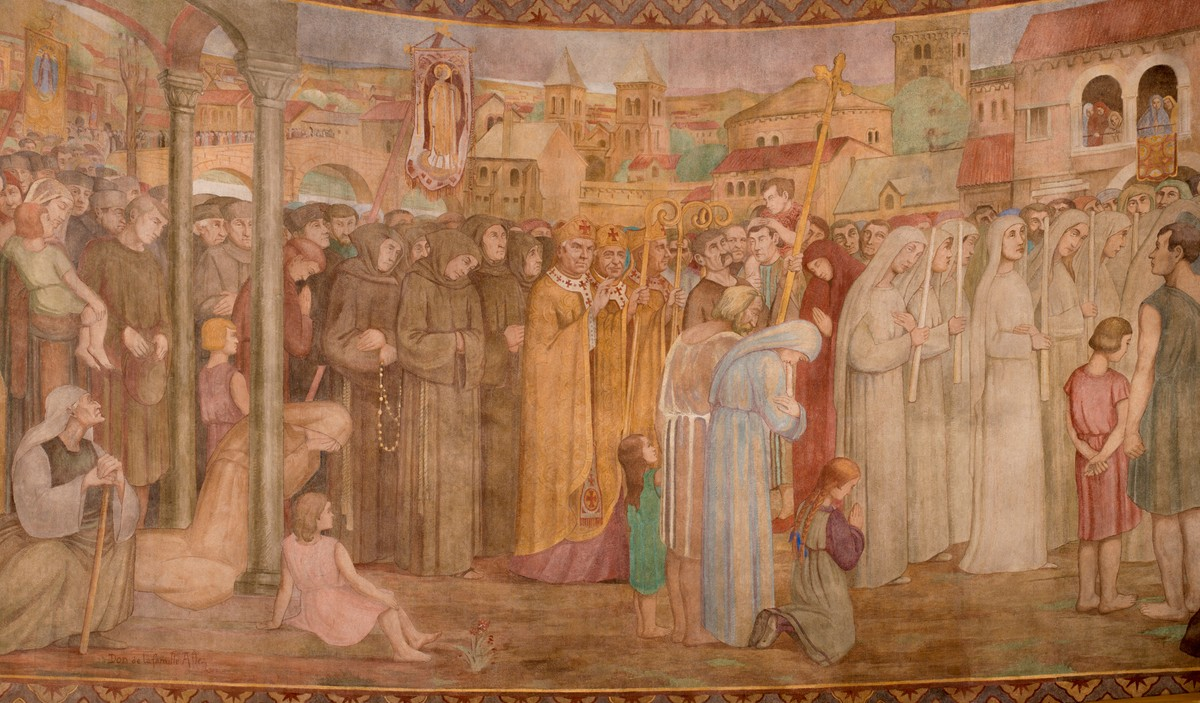
Section of a fresco in the Nanterre Cathedral

In 1535, Genevieve's cult became connected to the cult of Corpus Christi, which was included in what Sluhovsky called the "royal religion of early modern French absolutism" because the throne appropriated and changed it to support its authority and power in France. Sluhovsky goes on to say, "By parading the reliquary of the patron saint on a route which led from the royal parish to the cathedral, and by employing Sainte Geneviève to honour her superiors, a new balance of political powers in the city derive not from the patronage of Sainte Geneviève but from the powers of the Host and the king". In the summer of 1549, Genevieve's reliquary was involved in a royal supplicatory procession, which crossed the Seine to the Saint-Paul-Saint-Louis and then to Notre-Dame; it included the burning of heretics. In 1551, 1568, and 1582, her reliquary was processed from the Sainte-Chapelle to Notre-Dame instead of from her abbey, where it was used during royal invocations against the Protestants. As Sluhovsky states, "The redrawing of the Catholic space of Paris strengthened royal authority in the urban space, a royal authority that demanded clear demonstrations of compliance and humility from the city, just as it demanded and obtained them from Sainte Geneviève". These processions broke the tradition of bringing the reliquary and relics of Saint Marcel to Genevieve's abbey before processing to Notre-Dame; instead, it required that her reliquary "humbled itself" to honour the Eucharist and the king. It was also the first time her reliquary was not the most prestigious part in a public ritual.

In 1562, two processions were held to cleanse Paris of the heresy of Protestantism. The first procession ended at Saint Genevieve's Abbey and in the second, Genevieve's reliquary was carried by 20 barefoot laymen wearing flowers on their heads and was received with enthusiasm from the public. Sluhovsky considered the processions as a reaffirmation of the Eucharist and of Genevieve's part in how the Catholic authorities in Paris handled the divisions caused by the French Wars of Religion, between Catholics and the Huguenot Protestants. In 1589, processions were held and Genevieve was invoked in well-organised responses to conflict between King Henry III, the House of Guise, and the Catholic League. It was the first time that the public invoked Genevieve against the king. As Sluhovsky states, "the Feast of Saint Genevieve became a feast of hatred and division, not of harmony and peace". Sluhovsky also states that for the first time, invocations of Genevieve changed from demonstrations of loyalty to public demonstrations of revolt and disloyalty to the king. In 1591, the royal army besieged Paris; an attack on the army, led by Chevalier d'Aumale, was planned to occur on Genevieve's feast day. Prayers were made at her shrine as the fighting happened, but the attack failed and D'Aumale was killed. Sluhovsky reported that the failure decreased the city's devotion toward Genevieve; he called their accusations against her "not unfounded". Two more supplicatory processions occurred in 1594, but it also failed; Sluhovsky states that they demonstrated the "authorities' inability to control the public cult of Sainte Geneviève".

During the 1560s and 1570s and throughout the latter half of the 16th century, Genevieve was invoked for assistance during famines and food shortages, both in Paris and its outlying areas. Her invocations against water-based disasters, which influenced the country's crop yields, began to include "all sorts of agricultural and meteorological exigencies". As Sluhovsky stated, Genevieve "gradually became the patron saint of subsistence, the supplier of grain to the city". Beginning in the late 1500s, most of the processions with her reliquary occurred during the spring and early summer harvest months; in the previous centuries they occurred during the fall and winter, when the Seine was likely to flood. The response to all the major climate disasters of the 17th and 18th centuries were public invocations of Genevieve's interventions. Sluhovsky called this image of Genevieve "the nurturing patron" and considered it a feminization of her image at a time when women's roles were changing and becoming more restrictive, and when several canons took her as their patron saint, including novices to the Carmelite order in Paris. Genevieve's connection with charity, caring for the poor, and food relief, which continued to occur during the late 1600s, were based upon events during her life and was also expressed with processions of her reliquary and reports of her distribution of food to the poor in 1665. Other processions included one in 1556, in response to a drought throughout France, when peasants organized a procession to numerous shrines throughout Paris, including Genevieve's, when they were joined by city residents "in spontaneous public invocations of the patron".

=== 17th century ===
In 1619, François de La Rochefoucauld, a cardinal and confidant of Richelieu, was appointed abbot of Saint Genevieve's Abbey, which became the new headquarters of the Congregation of France and the center of monastic reform; by 1650, one-third of all monastic communities in France were included in the congregation. In 1649, when Paris was again engaged in open rebellion against the king, Genevieve appeared to Anne of Austria, the mother of King Louis XIV, in a vision after Anne invoked her for peace and the protection of the Paris people, even though many had just rebelled against her. The vision gave a different interpretation of a miracle that had occurred during Genevieve's lifetime; another depiction of another vision of the same miracle was distributed using the printing press, the first time it was used to recruit Genevieve "into oppositional political propaganda". Both visions used Genevieve's prestige to "articulate contemporary public opinions and sentiments". In 1652, additional entreatments and processions were called in response to the Fronde and the food shortages it caused. According to Sluhovsky, traditional veneration of Genevieve had "given way to manipulation" and after 1652, "all public invocations would be confronted with wide public cynicism and skepticism".

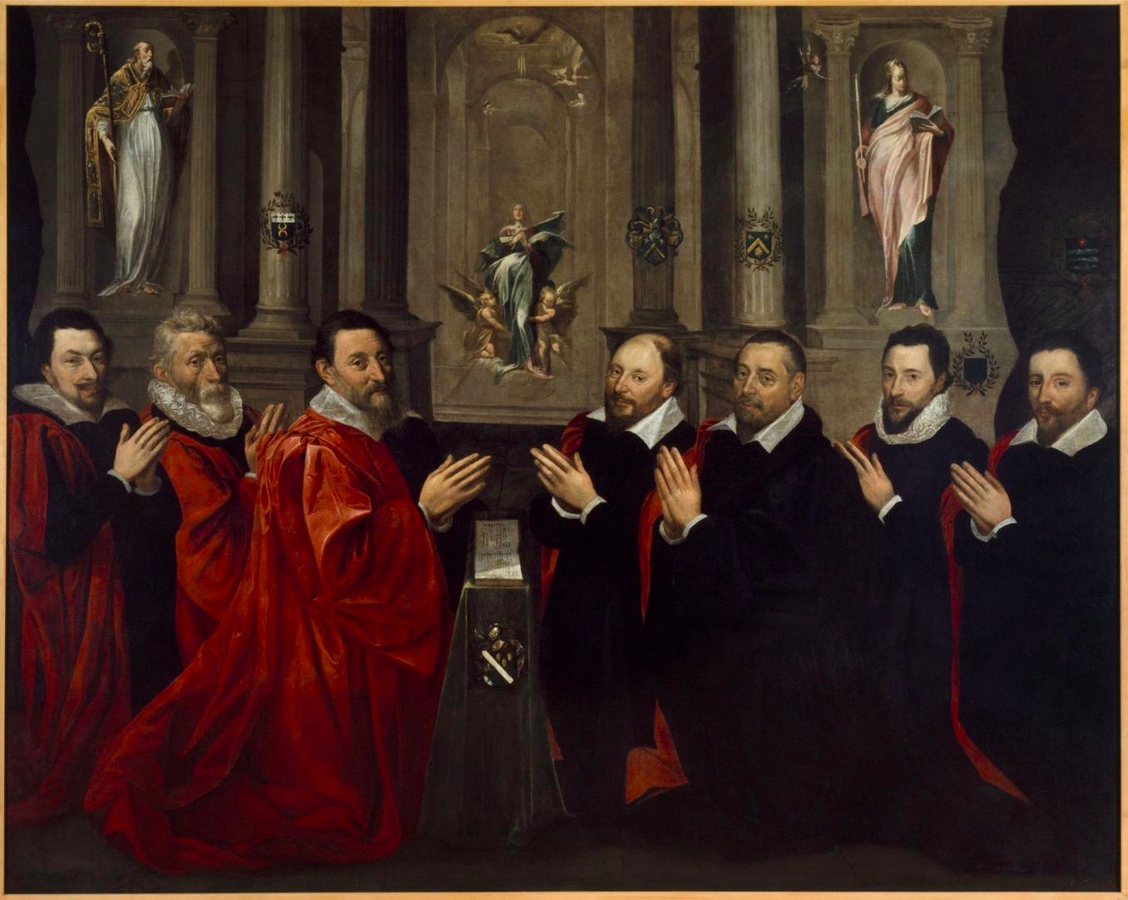
"The Échevins of Paris Praying before St Geneviève," by Georges Lallemand (1611)

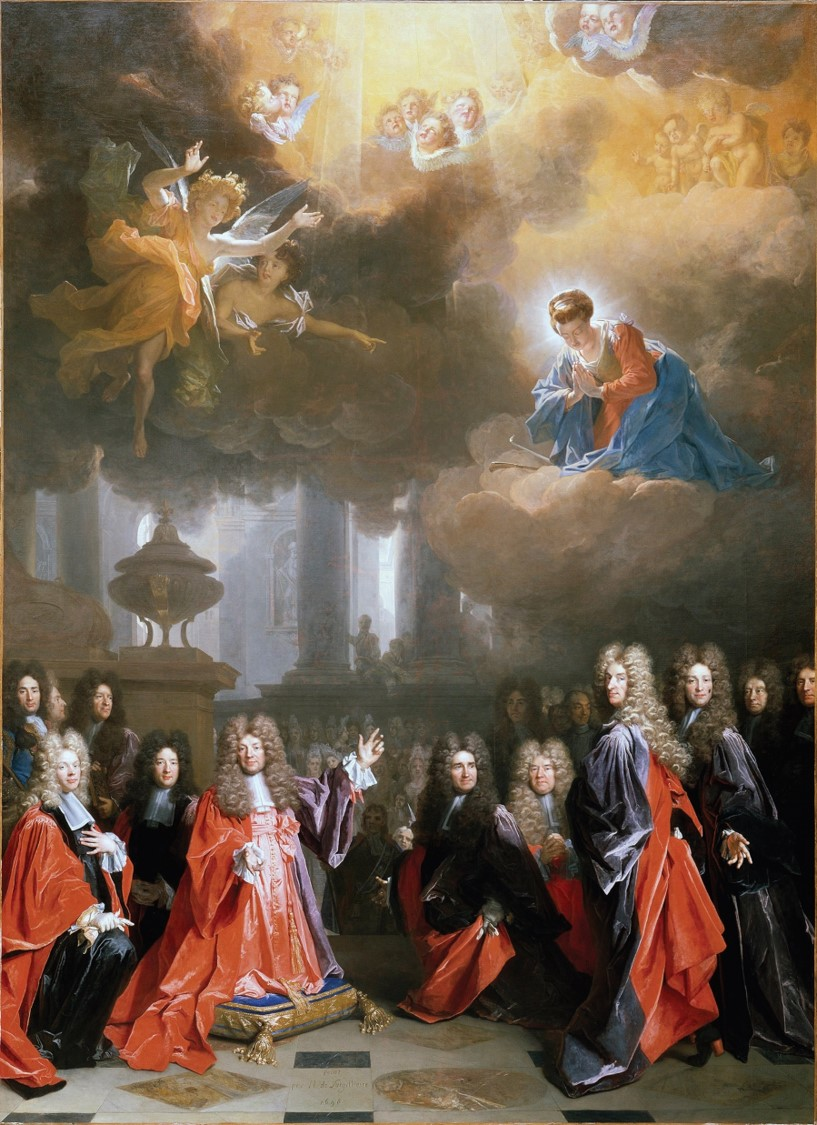
"The aldermen of Paris paying homage to Saint Geneviève" (1696) by Nicolas de Largilliére

By the 17th century, public invocations of Genevieve, even though their liturgies remained the same, changed from clerical affairs to secular public celebrations. Sluhovsky calls the clerical-based processions "ordinary" and the later popular entreatments and processions of the saint "extraordinary". Ordinary processions honoured Genevieve, legitimised her "unique position in the hierarchy of the sacred in Paris", established the route, between Notre-Dame and her shrine, of the processions, and solidified the "reciprocal relationship" between the cathedral and the shrine. Ordinary processions were based on the calendar and were marches from city to the shrine outside the city, while extraordinary processions and invocations were called during emergencies and were carried into Paris, for the city. At first, extraordinary processions were religious events and controlled by the clergy, but by 1631, Paris's secular authorities ordered and planned them. As Sluhovsky states, "Religious and secular bodies now shared the responsibility of organizing invocations, determining their dates, mobilizing the city, and guarding the reliquaries". Sluhovsky goes on to state that the new, extraordinary processions and invocations were a combination of Masses and celebrations of urban pride, and focused on processions to and from Genevieve's shrine. The later processions, according to Sluhovsky, turned into urban moveable feasts and emphasised the growing power of the city's elites and government officials. He states, "The religious austerity that characterized the invocations of the thirteenth century and of late medieval Paris, with its emphasis on penance and contrition, was replaced by the contradictory expressions of supplication and triumphalism". Theologians and preachers criticised the new forms for becoming spectacles, called for a return to older models, and speculated that Genevieve would no longer grant the people's invocations because they no longer made their requests to her sincerely.

In the early 17th century, many religious ceremonies were secularized, which required a remaking of Genevieve's cult. The Bourbons appropriated and incorporated it into their royal rites, ending traditional forms of her veneration, creating new ones, and providing her with the new role of protecting the royal family. According to Sluhovsky, these changes also "distanced humble Parisian believers from direct communication with their saint". Despite this, however, Genevieve maintained her prominence and her followers' loyalty to her did not decline. In 1764, in what Sluhovsky calls "the most significant event in the history of royal involvement with the cult of Sainte Geneviève", King Louis XV began construction of a new church, which later became the Panthéon, in her honour, ending over 200 years of royal patronage of her and financial support of her abbey and churches.

For example, Anne of Austria not only financially supported Saint Genevieve's Abbey, but she also supported the small church dedicated to Genevieve in Nanterre, where Anne made yearly pilgrimages and founded a seminary there in 1642. In 1658, Genevieve was invoked to heal Anne; no procession was called, but Genevieve's reliquary was removed, and Anne recovered from her illness. Two years later, however, Anne fell ill again, and a similar ceremony was held, but it did not work this time, and Anne died during the invocation. Genevieve's reliquary was removed 50 more times in the next 100 years, 33 times for the health of members of the French royal family. According to Sluhovsky, by the 17th century, "The shepherdess from Nanterre that Parisians had invoked a thousand years as a humble neighbor became ... a royal courtier". Saint Genevieve's Church began to be rebuilt in 1746 because it had decayed; as Farmer states, it "was secularized at the Revolution and was called the Panthéon, a burial place for the worthies of France".

In 1694, for example, Paris was in the middle of a severe economic crisis, with poor harvests, bad weather, threats of starvation, and an ongoing war, so the residents of Paris and the Île-de-France invoked Genevieve's intervention. Spontaneous processions and pilgrimages to Saint Genevieve's abbey started in early May, before an official proclamation allowed both clerics and lay people to participate. At first, invocations were made at the abbey, but it was not enough to improve the weather, so a public procession was called for on May 27. According to Sluhovsky, the poor, who were most affected by the food shortage, were allowed to participate to serve "social and political goals". Sluhovsky states, "By mobilizing the 'deserving poor' to invoke the saint, the organizers made God and the saint accountable for the food shortage, thus preventing the poor from holding the authorities themselves responsible". Also according to Sluhovsky, "The procession led to the expected results". Rain began immediately after the procession began, saving the country's crops, and other miracles occurred, including a victory against Spain, healings from paralysis, and the decrease in the price of wheat. The government of Paris commissioned a painting commemorating the event by Nicolas de Largillière. According to Sluhovsky, "An entire day of communal mobilization replaced the austere early morning processions of the late Middle Ages". The event was criticised, despite its popularity, for changing the processions into secular events.

=== 18th century and French Revolution ===
In 1725, Genevieve was invoked amidst religious and political conflict, which as Sluhovsky states, "had an impact on the ability of lay Parisians to maintain their traditional forms of devotion". Sluhovsky adds that the emotions the royal appropriation of Genevieve caused during the 1720s to the 1750s were motivated by Paris's deep attachment to Catholicism. In 1744, King Louis XV became ill in Lorraine during the War of the Austrian Succession; he invoked Genevieve, was healed, and made a pilgrimage to her shrine. The abbot and canons showed the king the church, which was deteriorated, and the king pledged to finance its renovation, which totalled over 25,000 livres. The construction was completed in 1764, when Louis XV laid the church's cornerstone. The project was criticised for being too expensive and unnecessary, and for the misuse of funds that could have been used for public relief. Sluhovsky called the building project the "beginning of one of the most important transformations of the cult since the construction of the original basilica in the sixth century". Genevieve was continued to be invoked by the royals throughout the 1700s, but the citizens of Paris often opposed and ridiculed them. The opposition of the royal appropriation of Genevieve occurred at the same time Protestants and Paris elites, including Voltaire, began to criticise Catholic practices such as the cult of the saints. The appropriation of Genevieve by the monarchy did not decrease the people's devotion to her during this time, even when processions stopped, and invocations to her were made for the royal family during the late 18th century. She regularly appeared in the popular religious literature of the time. By the late 18th century, lay devotion to her was no longer controlled by municipal or royal authorities. During the French Revolution, she was used "against the very same establishments which in previous centuries had been intimately connected with [her] cult". In July 1789, Saint Genevieve's Church was used to celebrate the Revolution, although the Revolutionary authorities eventually ended her cult. Genevieve's shrine and relics were mostly destroyed during the French Revolution, but as Farmer states, "this by no means finished her cult in France".

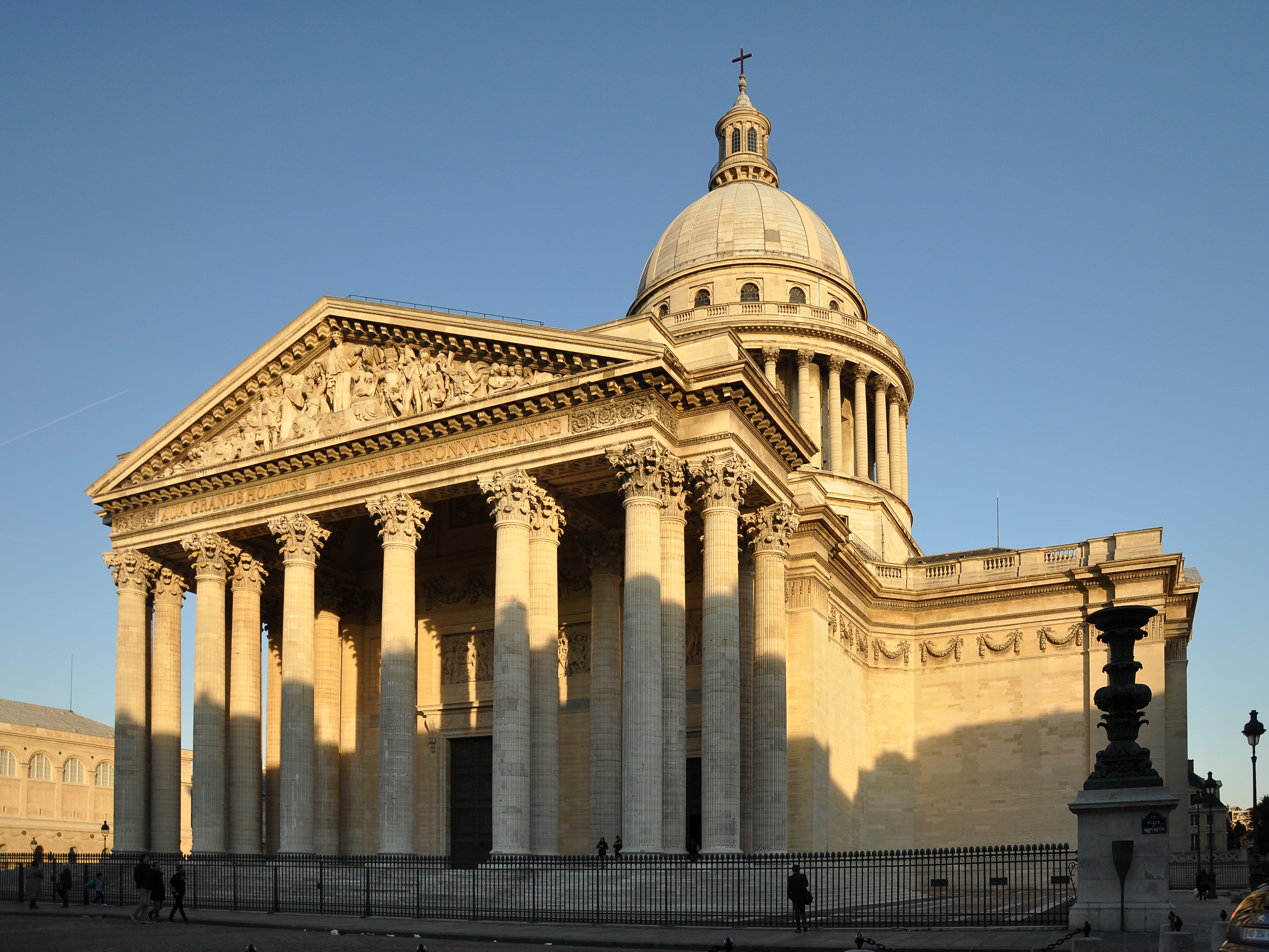
The Panthéon in Paris

In April 1791, after the death of Mirabeau, the early French Revolutionary leader, the French government secularised the Church of Saint Genevieve and turned it into a national monument and shrine honouring him. It ended an over 1,000-year period in which the building served as the centre of Genevieve's cult, as well as the religious traditions centring on her processions. Also in 1791, the ashes of Voltaire were transferred to the church, which was renamed the Panthéon. Despite the secularisation the transfer implied, Voltaire had a devotion to Geneviève and was proud of his grandfather's membership in the Company of the Bearers of the Reliquary of Sainte Geneviève. On his deathbed, Voltaire renewed his devotion to her. According to Sluhovsky, the building "became a temple of the new deities of the Enlightenment" and "a temple of civic liberty". He also called it "a turning point in the history of the monument"; the same time Voltaire's remains were transferred, Genevieve's remains were moved out of the church and into another part of the abbey. A year later, in 1792, after the monarchy's fall, Saint Genevieve's Abbey was secularised and confiscated, and despite the protests of hundreds of nearby residents, her remains were transferred again to the Saint-Étienne-du-Mont. Sluhovsky reports that Paris residents opposed the secularisation of Genevieve's shrine. In 1793, at the beginning of the Reign of Terror, her reliquary was brought to the Hôtel des Monnaies and dismantled; the funds collected were put into the government's treasury. According to Sluhovsky, Genevieve's bones were put on trial, found guilty of collaborating with the royal authorities, and condemned to be publicly burned at the Place de Greve. Her ashes were then thrown into the Seine.

=== Post-Revolution to Modernity ===
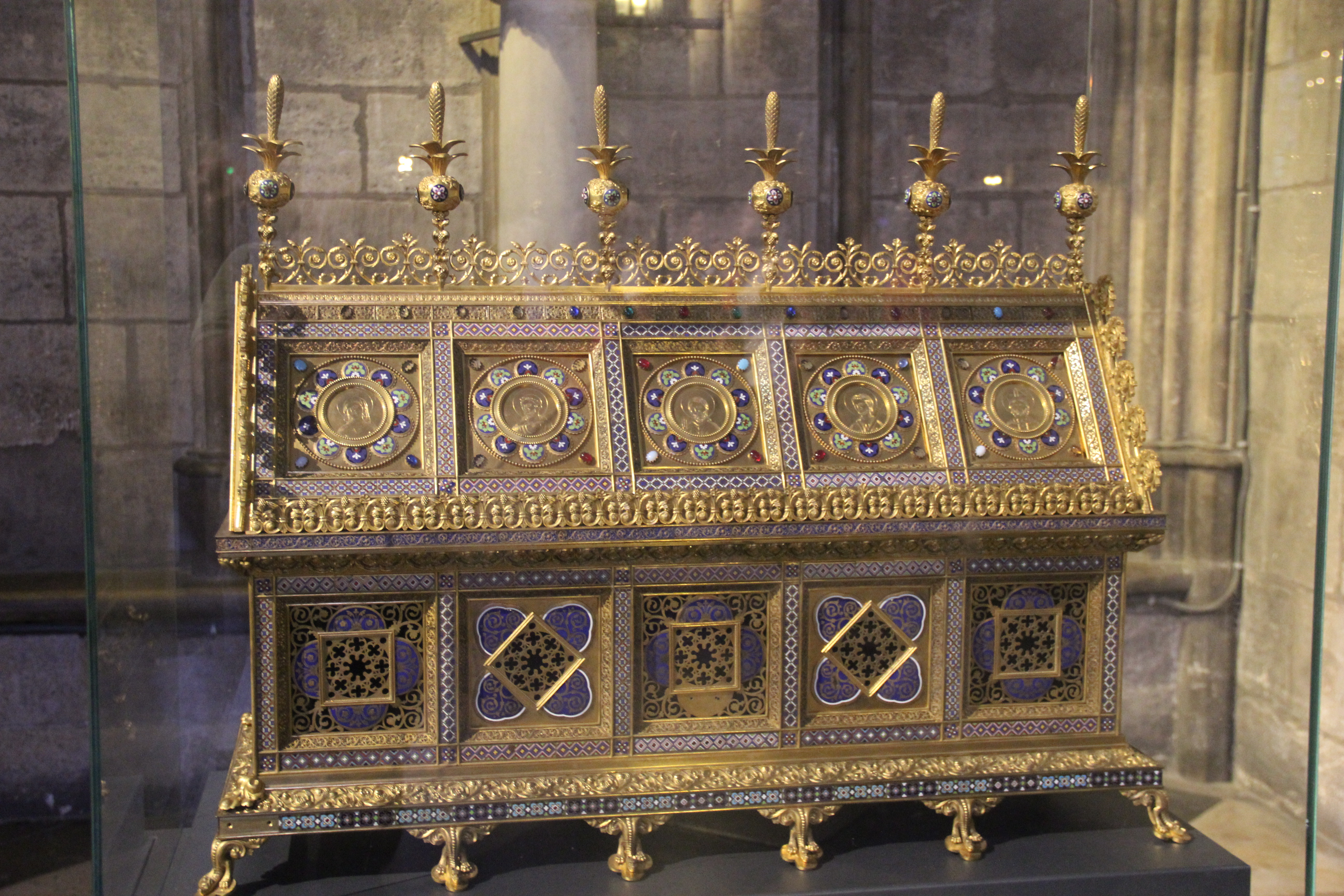
Reliquary of Saint Genevieve at Notre-Dame Cathedral

In 1803, after the end of the Revolution, Genevieve's cult was revived by Napoleon at the Saint-Étienne-du-Mont. New fragments of her relics were brought to Paris from other churches, and a new reliquary was built. In 1806, Napoleon ordered that the Panthéon be returned to its original purpose. In 1822, Louis XVIII founded a new Church of Saint Genevieve on the grounds of the Panthéon, and she was reinstated as the patron saint of Paris in 1831. A portion of Genevieve's stone tomb currently resides in a large casket in the church; a smaller reliquary contains the bones of one finger. Louis Phillippe I reinstated the building to a secular temple and Genevieve's relics were sent to Notre-Dame, but Napoleon III reinstated it as a church in 1851. Genevieve's relics, which survived the Revolution and were stored in churches outside of Paris, are stored in a reliquary at the Saint-Étienne-du-Mont, in her chapel.

According to Sluhovsky, Genevieve's cult experienced renewed popularity when she represented Catholic opposition to Republicanism. She was invoked to save France during World War I, and a procession carrying her relics occurred to prevent the German occupation of France during World War II. Also according to Sluhovsky, although Genevieve remains the patron saint of Paris, her cult has never returned to its pre-Revolutionary popularity and unifying status.

== Works cited ==
- Attwater, Donald; John, Catherine Rachel (1993). The Penguin Dictionary of Saints (3 ed.). New York: Penguin. pp. 151–152. ISBN 0-14-051312-4.
- "Genovefa (423-502)". Sainted Women of the Dark Ages. Edited and translated from Acta Sanctorum by McNamara, Jo Ann; Halborg, John E. Durham; with Whatley, E. Gordon. England: Duke University Press. 1992. pp. 17–37. ISBN 0-8223-1200-X.
- Sluhovsky, Moshe (1998). Patroness of Paris: Rituals of Devotion in Early Modern France. Leiden, The Netherlands: Koninklijke Brill. ISBN 90-04-10851-3.
- Williams, Hannah (September 2016). "Saint Geneviève's Miracles: Art and Religion in Eighteenth-Century Paris". French History. 30 (3): 322–353. doi:10.1093/fh/crv076.
