= Le Rousset-Marizy =

- Commune
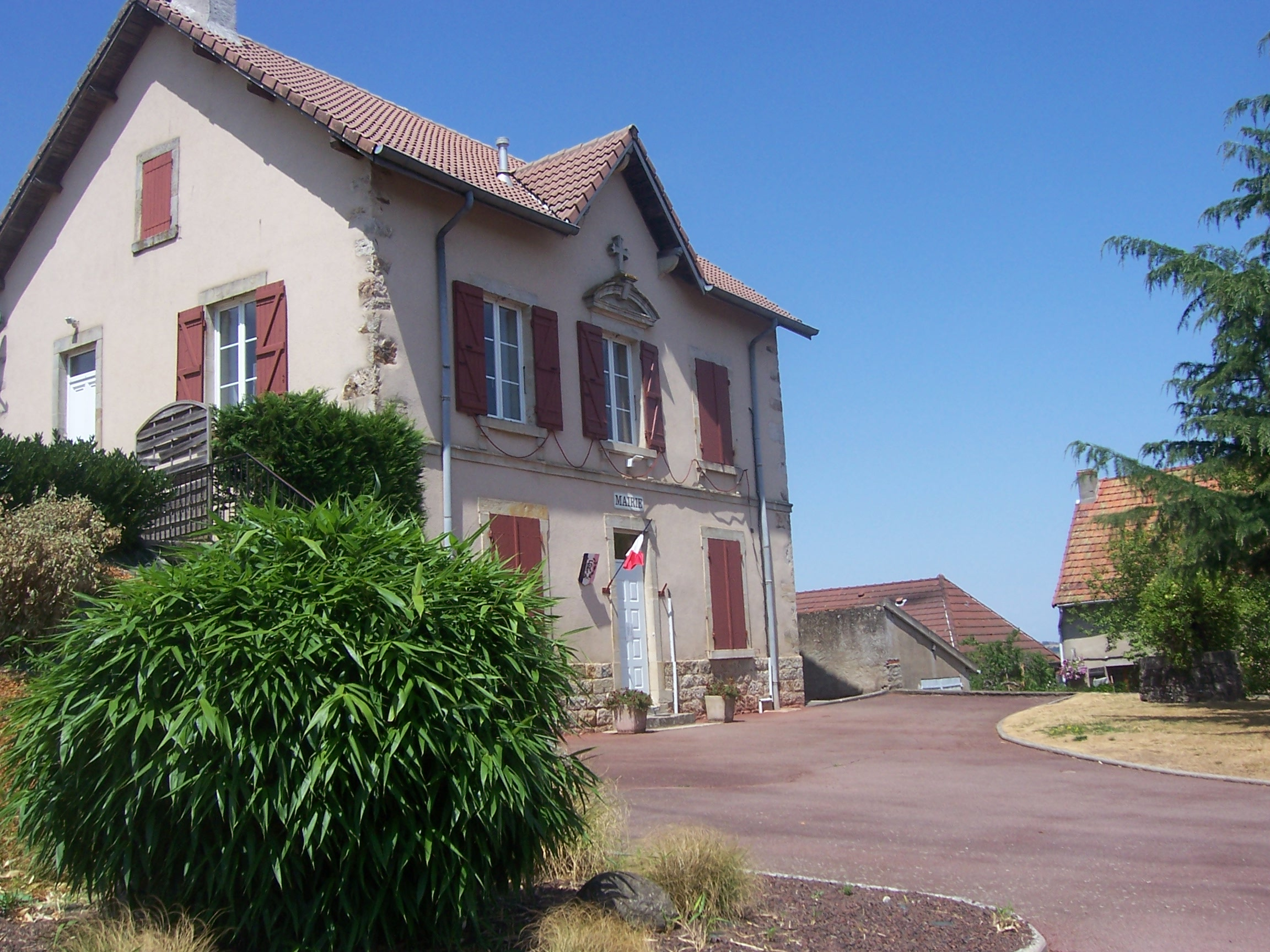
- The town hall in Le Rousset-Marizy
- Location of Le Rousset-Marizy
- Location within France Location within Bourgogne-Franche-Comté
- Coordinates: 46°33′58″N 4°24′29″E
- Country: France
- Region: Bourgogne-Franche-Comté
- Department: Saône-et-Loire
- Arrondissement: Charolles
- Canton: Charolles

Government
  - Mayor (2020–2026): Emmanuel Rey
- Area^{1}: 55.49 km^{2} (21.42 sq mi)
- Population (2023): 594
  - Density: 10.7/km^{2} (27.7/sq mi)
- Time zone: UTC+01:00 (CET)
  - Summer (DST): UTC+02:00 (CEST)
- INSEE/Postal code: 71279 /71220
- ^{1} French Land Register data, which excludes lakes, ponds, glaciers > 1 km^{2} (0.386 sq mi or 247 acres) and river estuaries.

Le Rousset-Marizy (French pronunciation: [lə ʁusɛ maʁizi]) is a commune in the Saône-et-Loire department of eastern France. The municipality was established on 1 January 2016 and consists of the former communes of Le Rousset and Marizy.

== See also ==
- Communes of the Saône-et-Loire department
