= Marizy =

Commune in Saône-et-Loire, France

- Part of Le Rousset-Marizy
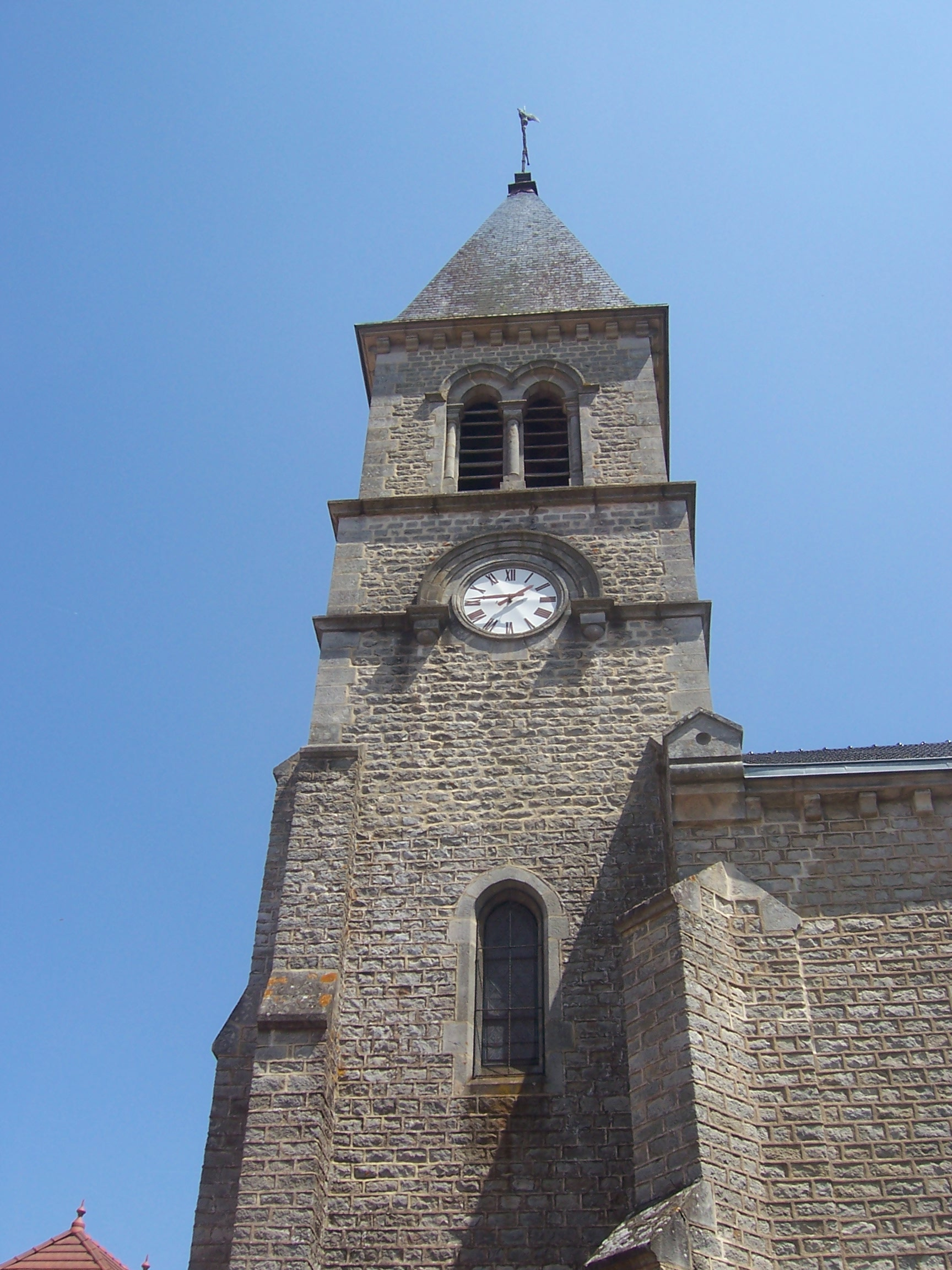
- Location of Marizy
- Location within France Location within Bourgogne-Franche-Comté
- Coordinates: 46°34′05″N 4°24′32″E
- Country: France
- Region: Bourgogne-Franche-Comté
- Department: Saône-et-Loire
- Arrondissement: Charolles
- Canton: Charolles
- Commune: Le Rousset-Marizy
- Area^{1}: 30.75 km^{2} (11.87 sq mi)
- Elevation: 340 m (1,120 ft)
- Highest elevation: 463 m (1,519 ft)
- Lowest elevation: 304 m (997 ft)
- Population (2022): 381
  - Density: 12.4/km^{2} (32.1/sq mi)
- Time zone: UTC+01:00 (CET)
  - Summer (DST): UTC+02:00 (CEST)
- Postal code: 71220
- ^{1} French Land Register data, which excludes lakes, ponds, glaciers > 1 km^{2} (0.386 sq mi or 247 acres) and river estuaries.

Marizy (French pronunciation: [maʁizi]) is a former commune in the Saône-et-Loire department in the region of Bourgogne-Franche-Comté in eastern France. On 1 January 2016, it was merged into the new commune of Le Rousset-Marizy.

== Geography ==
The Arconce forms part of the commune's eastern border, then flows south-southwest through its southern part.

== See also ==
- Communes of the Saône-et-Loire department
